= Deaths in December 2014 =

The following is a list of notable deaths in December 2014.

Entries for each day are listed alphabetically by surname. A typical entry lists information in the following sequence:

- Name, age, country of citizenship and reason for notability, established cause of death, reference.

== December 2014 ==
=== 1 ===
- Ray Abeyta, 58, American painter, motorcycle accident.
- Mario Abramovich, 88, Argentine violinist and composer.
- Mihailo Čanak, 82, Serbian architect and researcher.
- Jimmy Duncan, 83, Scottish footballer (Celtic).
- Alberto Breccia Guzzo, 68, Uruguayan politician.
- David Cooke, 59, British rear admiral, Commander Operations (2006–2009).
- Claudio Fiorentini, 93, Italian Olympic sport shooter.
- Allen Phillips Griffiths, 87, Welsh professor.
- Kim Song-ae, 89, North Korean politician, second wife of Kim Il Sung. (death announced on this date)
- Jean Klein, 70, French Olympic rower.
- Sita Murt, 68, Spanish fashion designer and businesswoman, cancer.
- Jordi Oliva, 55, Spanish Olympic field hockey player.
- Aleksandar Petrović, 55, Serbian basketball coach, amyotrophic lateral sclerosis.
- Roberto Sagastume Pinto, 70, Guatemalan politician, Mayor of Esquipulas (1996–2000), Governor of Chiquimula (2001–2003), traffic collision.
- Dimitrios Trichopoulos, 76, Greek-born American epidemiologist and oncologist, advanced the Mediterranean diet, heart attack.
- Rocky Wood, 55, New Zealand-born Australian author, complications from amyotrophic lateral sclerosis.

=== 2 ===
- Don L. Anderson, 81, American geophysicist, cancer.
- A. R. Antulay, 85, Indian politician, Chief Minister of Maharashtra (1980–1982).
- Dominique Aubier, 92, French author.
- Jean Béliveau, 83, Canadian Hall of Fame ice hockey player (Montreal Canadiens).
- Josie Cichockyj, 50, British wheelchair basketball player, cancer.
- Gerry DeLeeuw, 88, Canadian football player.
- Theill Drengsgaard, 87, Danish footballer.
- Ian Fairbairn, 83, English actor (Doctor Who, Timeslip, Emergency Ward 10).
- Gerry Fisher, 88, British cinematographer (Highlander, Running on Empty, Wise Blood).
- Juan Flores, 71, American educator, professor of social and cultural analysis, Guillain–Barré syndrome.
- Peter Furneaux, 79, English football club chairman and investor (Grimsby Town).
- Andre Gill, 73, Canadian ice hockey player (Boston Bruins).
- Peter Gübeli, 89, Swiss Olympic rower.
- André Le Guillerm, 90, French Olympic weightlifter.
- Albert Jackson, 71, English footballer (Bangor City, Oldham Athletic, Wigan Athletic).
- Bobby Keys, 70, American saxophonist (The Rolling Stones), cirrhosis.
- John Laurence Lambert, 78, Australian author, lung cancer.
- Don Laws, 85, American figure skater and coach, heart failure.
- Carlos Mamery, 54, Puerto Rican music producer and television personality (Idol Puerto Rico), heart attack.
- Marion D. McGowan, 86, American politician.
- A. J. McNamara, 78, American legislator and federal judge, progressive supranuclear palsy.
- Lyudmila Perepyolkina, 84, Russian actress.
- Hans-Dieter Riechel, 79, German Olympic biathlete.
- Giampaolo Rugarli, 81, Italian novelist.
- Herbert L. Strauss, 78, German-born American chemist.
- Jeff Truman, 57, Australian actor (Neighbours, Superman Returns, Home and Away) and screenwriter.
- Deven Verma, 77, Indian film actor.
- Dennis Walaker, 73, American politician, Mayor of Fargo, North Dakota (since 2006), kidney cancer.

=== 3 ===
- Herman Badillo, 85, Puerto Rican-born American politician, member of the U.S. House from New York's 22nd (1971–1973) and 21st (1973–1977) districts, heart failure.
- Jacques Barrot, 77, French politician, European Commissioner for Justice, Freedom and Security (2008–2010).
- Poppy Bermúdez, 86, Argentine-born Dominican chief executive (Bermúdez).
- Nathaniel Branden, 84, Canadian-born American psychologist.
- L. Stephen Coles, 73, American scientist, co-founder and the Executive Director of the Gerontology Research Group, pancreatic cancer.
- Lulu Dikana, 35, South African recording artist and vocalist, oesophageal perforation.
- Hubert Egger, 87, German cross country skier.
- Martha Farkas Glaser, 93, Civil Rights Activist and Manager of Jazz musician Erroll Garner.
- Graeme Goodall, 82, Australian recording engineer and record label owner, co-founder of Island Records.
- Sjefke Janssen, 95, Dutch racing cyclist.
- Vicente Leñero, 81, Mexican writer and journalist, pulmonary emphysema.
- Kostas Linoxilakis, 81, Greek footballer.
- Irving Malin, 80, American literary critic.
- Ann Marcus, 93, American television writer (Days of Our Lives, General Hospital, Peyton Place).
- Vincent L. McKusick, 93, American attorney, Chief Justice of Maine (1977–1992).
- Ian McLagan, 69, English keyboardist (Small Faces), stroke.
- Alfred E. Novak, 84, American-born Brazilian Roman Catholic prelate, Bishop of Paranaguá (1989–2006).
- Patrick Edward O'Connor, 82, New Zealand-born Tokelauan Roman Catholic prelate, Ecclesiastical Superior of Tokelau (1992–2011).
- Luc Oursel, 55, French businessman, CEO of Areva (2011–2014).
- Giulio Questi, 90, Italian director and screenwriter (Django Kill, La morte ha fatto l'uovo).
- Walter Reyno, 79, Uruguayan actor, respiratory failure.
- Jack Scott, 85, American college football coach.
- James Stewart, 73, Canadian mathematician and violinist, multiple myeloma.
- Jim Swink, 78, American football player (Dallas Texans), lymphoma.
- William Taupier, 78, American politician.
- Vyacheslav Tikhomirov, 69, Russian military officer, Commander-in-Chief of the Internal Troops of Russia (2000–2004).
- Sergio Armando Valls, 73, Mexican judge, member of the Supreme Court (since 2004).
- Ray Williams, 87, Welsh rugby union coach.

=== 4 ===
- Sitamadji Allarassem, 25, Chadian footballer.
- Mariam Behnam, 93, Iranian-born Emirati writer, diplomat and women's rights activist.
- Richard Bootzin, 74, American psychologist, heart disease.
- Nikolay Brusentsov, 89, Russian computer scientist.
- Bryan Burwell, 59, American sportswriter, cancer.
- Charles De Sorgher, 84, Belgian Olympic bobsledder.
- Brian Dunsworth, 89, Canadian football player.
- Hroar Elvenes, 82, Norwegian Olympic speed skater (1952, 1956, 1960, 1964).
- Claudia Emerson, 57, American poet, complications of colon cancer.
- Frank and Louie, 15, American-born Ragdoll cat, world's oldest diprosopus cat, euthanized.
- Jack Gregory, 87, American football coach (Rhode Island Rams).
- Talât Sait Halman, 83, Turkish poet and academic, Minister of Culture and Tourism (1971).
- V. R. Krishna Iyer, 99, Indian judge, member of the Supreme Court.
- Takeo Kamachi, 78, Japanese Olympic sport shooter, stroke.
- Lynne Kosky, 56, Australian politician, MLA for Altona (1996–2010), breast cancer.
- Bob Montgomery, 77, American songwriter ("Heartbeat", "Misty Blue"), Parkinson's disease.
- Gavril Nagy, 82, Romanian Olympic water polo player.
- Aleksey Nasedkin, 72, Russian pianist and composer.
- Hugo Niskanen, 94, Finnish Olympic long-distance runner (1952).
- Margaret Scott, 86, New Zealand author.
- Jeremy Thorpe, 85, British politician, Leader of the Liberal Party (1967–1976), MP for North Devon (1959–1979), central figure in the Thorpe affair, Parkinson's disease.
- Rudolf Vanmoerkerke, 90, Belgian businessman.
- Silvio Zavala, 105, Mexican historian.

=== 5 ===
- Yashar Adem, 74, Turkish actor.
- Ernest C. Brace, 83, American pilot, longest civilian POW in Vietnam War.
- John C. Burton, 91, American cross country skier.
- Manuel De Sica, 65, Italian composer, heart attack.
- Queen Fabiola of Belgium, 86, Spanish-born queen consort of King Baudouin.
- Ralph Adam Fine, 73, American judge, member of the Wisconsin Court of Appeals.
- Rod Graber, 84, American baseball player.
- Jackie Healy-Rae, 83, Irish politician, TD for Kerry South (1997–2011).
- Luis Herrera de la Fuente, 98, Mexican conductor and composer.
- Edna Hibel, 97, American artist.
- Kōichi Kawakita, 72, Japanese special effects director (Godzilla vs. Biollante).
- Arthur Leipzig, 96, American photographer.
- Gil Marks, 62, American food writer and historian, lung cancer.
- Dennis Marriott, 75, English cricketer.
- Gennadi Poloka, 84, Russian Soviet-era film director.
- Marco Torlonia, 6th Prince of Civitella-Cesi, 77, Spanish nobleman.
- Silvio Zavala, 105, Mexican historian and diplomat, Ambassador to France (1966–1975).

=== 6 ===
- Ralph H. Baer, 92, American video game pioneer, inventor and engineer, developed the Magnavox Odyssey, recipient of the National Medal of Technology (2004).
- Mick Barry, 95, Irish road bowler.
- Robert T. Bennett, 75, American politician.
- Jimmy Del Ray, 52, American professional wrestler (WWF, WCW), traffic collision.
- David Galloway, 72, New Zealand biochemist and botanist.
- Fred Hawkins, 91, American golfer.
- Menis Koumandareas, 83, Greek writer.
- Naphtali Lau-Lavie, 88, Israeli writer and diplomat.
- Renato Mambor, 78, Italian painter.
- Maquinita Merlos, 73, Salvadoran football player (Águila, national team) and manager.
- Nick Nicolau, 81, American football coach.
- Oscar Whisky, 9, Irish-bred British-trained Thoroughbred racehorse, fall.
- Takao Saito, 85, Japanese cinematographer, chronic lymphocytic leukemia.
- Adnan Gulshair el Shukrijumah, 39, Saudi Arabian-born external operations chief (al-Qaeda), shot.
- Luke Somers, 33, British-born American photojournalist and AQAP hostage, shot.
- Emma Lou Thayne, 90, American Mormon poet.
- István Varga, 71, Hungarian Olympic handball player.
- Stella Young, 32, Australian comedian and disability advocate.

=== 7 ===
- Abdellah Baha, 60, Moroccan politician, Minister of State (since 2012), MP for Rabat (since 2002), hit by train.
- Horace Batten, 102, English shoemaker and bootmaker.
- João de Sousa, 90, Portuguese Olympic rower.
- Lawrence Dorr, 89, Hungarian-American writer.
- Charlie Flowers, 77, American football player (Los Angeles Chargers, Ole Miss Rebels).
- Brian Roy Goble, 57, Canadian musician (Subhumans), heart attack.
- Irving Guttman, 86, Canadian opera director.
- Stu Hamer, 80, British jazz trumpeter.
- Carol Judge, 73, American healthcare advocate and registered nurse, First Lady of Montana (1973–1980), cancer.
- Holger Larsen, 89, Danish Olympic rower.
- Mark Lewis, 60, American storyteller, actor and teacher.
- Norman Mair, 86, Scottish rugby union player and journalist.
- Eddie Rouse, 60, American actor (American Gangster, Pineapple Express, Being Flynn), liver failure.
- Grahanandan Singh, 88, Indian Olympic field hockey player.
- Khalil Ullah Khan, 80, Bangladeshi film and television actor.
- Tommy Todd, 88, Scottish footballer (Airdrie, Hamilton, Crewe, Derby and Rochdale).
- Nikolai Vasenin, 95, Russian World War II veteran, Legion of Honour recipient.
- Ken Weatherwax, 59, American actor (The Addams Family), heart attack.
- Jerzy Wilim, 73, Polish footballer.

=== 8 ===
- Paul S. Amenta, 92, American politician, member of the Connecticut Senate.
- Sacvan Bercovitch, 81, Canadian literary and cultural critic.
- James Brown, 83, Scottish cricketer.
- Robert N. Burr, 98, American historian.
- Martha Cecilia, 61, Filipino writer, cancer.
- Sobho Gianchandani, 94, Pakistani writer and social scientist, heart attack.
- Tom Gosnell, 63, Canadian politician, Mayor of London, Ontario (1986–1994), cancer.
- Buddy Hicks, 87, American baseball player (Detroit Tigers), complications from a fall.
- Russ Kemmerer, 84, American baseball player (Washington Senators, Chicago White Sox).
- Nedunuri Krishnamurthy, 87, Indian carnatic vocalist, lung cancer.
- Mango, 60, Italian singer ("Bella d'estate", "Lei verrà"), heart attack.
- Ralph Maud, 85, Canadian literary scholar.
- Knut Nystedt, 99, Norwegian orchestral and choral composer.
- Brian Sullivan, 48, American lawyer and politician, member of the Washington House of Representatives (1997–2001), assistant district attorney of Barrow, Alaska, shot.
- Elmārs Zemgalis, 91, Latvian-born American chess player.

=== 9 ===
- Dave Behrman, 73, American football player (Buffalo Bills, Denver Broncos), pancreatic cancer.
- Tony Bullen, 83, British Olympic speed skater.
- Ion Butmalai, 50, Moldovan politician, MP (since 2009), suicide by gunshot.
- Frank Farrington, 88, Australian rugby league player and administrator (Newtown Jets).
- José Feghali, 53, Brazilian pianist, suicide by gunshot.
- Jane Freilicher, 90, American representational painter.
- Stuart Hunt, 87, American politician, member of the Vermont House of Representatives.
- Robert Kinoshita, 100, American production designer (Lost in Space, Forbidden Planet).
- Gerd Kirste, 96, Norwegian politician.
- Jean-Marie Léyé, 82, Ni-Vanuatu politician, President (1994–1999).
- Jorge María Mejía, 91, Argentine Roman Catholic prelate, cardinal, Archivist of the Vatican Secret Archives (1998–2003), Librarian of the Vatican Library (1998–2003).
- Mary Ann Mobley, 77, American actress (Diff'rent Strokes, Falcon Crest) and television personality, Miss America (1959), breast cancer.
- Lydia Mordkovitch, 70, Russian-born British violinist, cancer.
- Blagoje Paunović, 67, Serbian football player and manager.
- Karl Otto Pöhl, 85, German economist, President of the Bundesbank (1980–1991).
- Emma Ruíz, 92, Mexican Olympic fencer.
- Lila Sapinsley, 92, American politician, member of the Rhode Island Senate (1973–1984).
- Sheila Stewart, 77, Scottish singer, storyteller, and author.
- Dave Theisen, 73, American football player (Toronto Argonauts, Winnipeg Blue Bombers).
- Jože Toporišič, 88, Slovene linguist.
- Clifford Wright, 87, Canadian politician, Mayor of Saskatoon (1976–1988), lung cancer.

=== 10 ===
- Ziad Abu Ein, 55, Palestinian politician, coronary blockage from heart hemorrhage.
- John P. Anton, 94, American philosopher.
- Anubes da Silva, 79, Brazilian Olympic sprinter.
- Don Dufek Sr., 85, American football player.
- Pierre Fautrier, 91, French cyclist.
- Ralph Giordano, 91, German writer and publicist, complications from hip fracture.
- Raúl Gómez Ramírez, 50, Mexican politician, MP for Guanajuato (since 2012), injuries sustained in a traffic collision.
- Slađa Guduraš, 27, Bosnian singer and actress, traffic collision.
- Alice Hoover, 86, American baseball player (All-American Girls Professional Baseball League).
- Catherine Hughes, 81, British diplomat and academic.
- James Koller, 78, American poet.
- Caroline Ludlow, 67, British judge, leukaemia.
- Donald Moffitt, 83, American science fiction author.
- Robert B. Oakley, 83, American diplomat, Ambassador to Zaire (1979–1982), Somalia (1982–1984) and Pakistan (1988–1991), Parkinson's disease.
- Otto Pöggeler, 85, German philosopher.
- Bob Solinger, 88, Canadian ice hockey player (Detroit Red Wings, Toronto Maple Leafs).
- Judy Baar Topinka, 70, American politician, Illinois Treasurer (1995–2007) and Comptroller (since 2011), complications related to a stroke.
- Gerard Vianen, 70, Dutch racing cyclist, leukemia.
- Robert Wolfe, 93, American historian, archivist and World War II veteran.
- Martin Zijlstra, 70, Dutch politician, member of the House of Representatives (1989–2002).

=== 11 ===
- Tom Adams, 76, English actor (The Great Escape, Licensed to Kill, Doctor Who), cancer.
- Ahmed al Tilemsi, 36-37, Malian terrorist, shot.
- George Ardisson, 82, Italian actor (The Long Hair of Death, Hercules in the Haunted World, Agent 3S3: Passport to Hell).
- Roger Bielle, 86, French Olympic wrestler.
- Tim Black, 77, English family planning pioneer, founder of Marie Stopes International.
- Vera Bulatova, 82, Uzbek archaeologist, architectural historian and museologist.
- Peter Clarke, 81, English chess player.
- Harold Crocker, 86, Australian rugby league footballer.
- Benigno De Grandi, 90, Italian footballer (Palermo, A.C. Milan).
- John D. Driggs, 87, American politician, Mayor of Phoenix, Arizona (1970–1974), established the Phoenix Mountain Preserve, pancreatitis.
- Michel du Cille, 58, American photojournalist (The Washington Post), heart attack.
- Sergio Fiorentini, 80, Italian actor (A Special Cop in Action, The Invisible Wall) and voice actor.
- Patricia Gallaher, 77, Australian librarian.
- Jack Harrington, 84, Australian rules footballer (Essendon).
- Robert A. Johnson, 93, American politician.
- Philip Knights, Baron Knights, 94, English police officer and peer, Chief Constable of the West Midlands (1975–1985).
- Georges Lagrange, 85, French Roman Catholic prelate, Bishop of Gap (1988–2003).
- Fred Meggs, 62, American composer, cancer.
- Mel Richardson, 86, American politician, member of the Idaho House of Representatives (1988–1992) and Senate (1992–2008), cancer.
- Dawn Sears, 53, American country musician (Nothin' but Good), lung cancer.
- Gerald Sim, 89, English actor (Gandhi, Patriot Games, Frenzy).
- Robert Taylor, 70, American animator, film director and screenwriter (The Nine Lives of Fritz the Cat), chronic obstructive pulmonary disease.
- Laszlo Varga, 89, Hungarian-born American cellist.
- Hans Wallat, 85, German conductor and music director.

=== 12 ===
- John Baxter, 78, Scottish footballer (Hibernian).
- Rod Belcher, 94, American football and basketball announcer.
- Norman Bridwell, 86, American author and cartoonist (Clifford the Big Red Dog), prostate cancer.
- James Clarke, 91, English footballer.
- Peter Delisle, 79, English cricketer.
- Jonathan Dunn-Rankin, 84, American actor, television journalist and activist.
- Phillip Edwards, 87, British rear admiral and bursar.
- Ivor Grattan-Guinness, 73, English historian of mathematics and logic.
- John Hampton, 61, American music engineer and producer, complications of cancer.
- José María Lorant, 59, Argentine football player and coach.
- Donald S. Malecki, 81, American author and insurance consultant.
- Billy Milligan, 59, American criminal defendant diagnosed with multiple personality disorder, cancer.
- John Persen, 73, Norwegian composer.
- Herb Plews, 86, American baseball player (Washington Senators).
- Mohammad Shahid, 66, Indian cricketer.
- Yury Shutov, 68, Russian politician, heart attack.
- Vladimír Stibořík, 87, Czech Olympic sport shooter (1960, 1964).
- Graham Turbott, 100, New Zealand ornithologist.
- Mary Jeanne van Appledorn, 87, American composer.
- Alan Ward, 79, New Zealand historian.
- Dave West, 70, British businessman, stabbed.
- Bill Young, 32, American comedian.

=== 13 ===
- Yvonne Abbas, 92, member of the French Resistance.
- Ernst Albrecht, 84, German politician, Prime Minister of Lower Saxony (1976–1990).
- Mary Arden, 81, American actress.
- Norbert P. Arnold, 94, American mechanical engineer, businessman, and politician.
- Joan Barril, 62, Spanish writer and journalist, pneumonia.
- Ina Bauer, 73, German figure skater.
- Anthony Birch, 90, British political scientist.
- Bill Bonds, 82, American television news anchor (WXYZ-TV), heart attack.
- Geoffrey Cooper, 89, British RAF officer.
- Aaron Goldberg, 97, American botanist.
- John Hickman, 87, New Zealand meteorologist.
- Janis Martin, 75, American opera singer.
- William E. May, 86, American theologian.
- Andreas Schockenhoff, 57, German politician, MP (since 1990).
- Martha Sigall, 97, American animator (Looney Tunes).
- Phil Stern, 95, American photographer, emphysema and heart failure.
- Brian Swatuk, 65, Canadian jockey, cancer.
- Taitetsu Unno, 85, Japanese Shin Buddhist scholar and author.

=== 14 ===
- Angalifu, 44, Sudanese-born American rhinoceros, one of two remaining male northern white rhinoceros.
- Fatima bint Rashid Al Nuaimi, Emirati Ajman royal.
- Anoushirvan Arjmand, 73, Iranian actor, heart attack.
- Daniel Beren, 85, American politician.
- Sy Berger, 91, American baseball promoter.
- Franz Brunner, 83, Austrian Olympic wrestler.
- Joe Carr, 63, American bluegrass musician, stroke.
- Peter R. Chacon, 89, American politician, pneumonia.
- Alex Chigogidze, 59, Georgian general topologist.
- Theo Colborn, 87, American environmentalist and academic.
- Irene Dalis, 89, American opera singer and impresario.
- Bobo Faulkner, 73, English model and television personality, cancer.
- Millie Kirkham, 91, American singer.
- Louis Alphonse Koyagialo, 67, Congolese politician, Acting Prime Minister of the Democratic Republic of the Congo (2012).
- Hal Lewis, 79, American football player (Baltimore Colts, Buffalo Bills, Oakland Raiders).
- Rachael Low, 91, British film historian.
- Doug Martin, 78, American college basketball coach (South Dakota Coyotes).
- John McCraw, 89, New Zealand soil scientist.
- Jakell Mitchell, 18, American college football player (Auburn University), shot.
- Bess Myerson, 90, American model (Miss America 1945) and television actress.
- Villy Moll Nielsen, 87, Danish Olympic field hockey player.
- Anthony Edward Pevec, 89, American Roman Catholic prelate, Auxiliary Bishop of Cleveland (1982–2001).
- Lee Sandlin, 58, American journalist and author.
- P. J. Sarma, 70, Indian actor and dubbing artist, heart attack.
- Rohit Talwar, 49, Indian cricketer, cancer.
- Fuzzy Thurston, 80, American football player (Green Bay Packers), Alzheimer's disease and cancer.
- Johnny Treadwell, 73, American football player (Texas Longhorns).

=== 15 ===
- Johnnie L. Caldwell, 92, American politician.
- Chakri, 40, Indian film composer and playback singer, heart attack.
- David R. Chesnutt, 73-74, American historian and editor, throat cancer.
- Booth Colman, 91, American actor (Planet of the Apes, Norma Rae, Intolerable Cruelty).
- Herbert E. Douglass, 87, American theologian.
- John Gall, 89, American author and pediatrician.
- David Garth, 84, American political consultant.
- Jeff Guy, 74, South African historian.
- Joseph Hamilton, 95, American football coach.
- Michael Hare Duke, 89, Scottish Anglican bishop.
- Cotton Hodges, 88, American racecar driver.
- Mustapha Maarof, 79, Malaysian actor.
- Nicolae Manea, 60, Romanian football player and manager, liver cancer.
- Takeo Matsubara, 93, Japanese physicist.
- Donald Metcalf, 85, Australian medical researcher, pancreatic cancer.
- Clarence Noland, 77, American politician.
- Lawrence A. Roberts, 86, American politician.
- Ray Steadman-Allen, 92, British composer and Salvation Army officer.
- Arthur Whyte, 93, Australian politician, President of the South Australian Legislative Council (1978–1985).
- Fausto Zapata, 73, Mexican journalist, politician and diplomat, Governor of San Luis Potosí (1991), cancer.

=== 16 ===
- Phillip Archuleta, 65, American politician, member of the New Mexico House of Representatives (since 2013), pneumonia.
- J. K. M. A. Aziz, Bangladeshi politician.
- Anthony Bottrall, 76, British diplomat.
- Martin Brasier, 67, English palaeobiologist and astrobiologist, traffic collision.
- Inés Cifuentes, 59, English-born American seismologist and educator, breast cancer.
- Tim Cochran, 59, American mathematician.
- Yvonne Cossart, 80, Australian virologist.
- Reidar Dørum, 89, Norwegian footballer (FK Ørn-Horten).
- Maurice Duverger, 97, French jurist, sociologist and politician.
- Osee Fagan, 90, American judge.
- Jack Hazlett, 76, New Zealand rugby union player (Southland, national team).
- Abdulmari Imao, 78, Filipino sculptor.
- Eddie Kachur, 80, Canadian ice hockey player (Chicago Blackhawks).
- Karl-Heinz Kurras, 87, German police officer and Stasi member, killed Benno Ohnesorg.
- Maurie Lyon, 83, Australian footballer (South Melbourne).
- Man Haron Monis, 50, Iranian self-styled Muslim cleric and hostage taker, shot.
- Maximo Munzi, 57, Argentine cinematographer, pancreatic cancer.
- Romie J. Palmer, 93, American politician, member of the Illinois House of Representatives.
- Wendy Rene, 67, American soul singer, complications from stroke.
- Rock Scully, 73, American band manager (Grateful Dead), lung cancer.
- Sultan Singh, 91, Indian politician, Governor of Tripura (1989–1990).
- Ernie Terrell, 75, American heavyweight boxer, WBA champion (1965–1967).

=== 17 ===
- Judith Baker, 75, American judoka.
- Eric Bjornstad, 80, American climber and author.
- Rex Chandler, 77, American politician.
- Chan Kwok-Hung, 51, Chinese cinematographer (Fly Me to Polaris, Skiptrace), drowned.
- Hildward Croes, 52, Aruban musician, composer and arranger, cancer.
- Stephen Youssef Doueihi, 87, Lebanese-born American Maronite Catholic hierarch, Bishop of St. Maron of Brooklyn (1997–2004).
- Neville Featherstone-Griffin, 81, English cricketer (Surrey).
- Clarke Fraser, 94, Canadian medical geneticist.
- Fritz Rudolf Fries, 79, German writer.
- Dieter Grau, 101, German-born American rocket scientist, NASA Quality Control Director for the Saturn V.
- Neil James, 53, English rugby league player.
- Richard C. Hottelet, 97, American broadcast journalist (Murrow's Boys).
- Leonard Kent, 89, New Zealand cricketer.
- Stephen J. Kopp, 63, American educator, President of Marshall University (since 2005), heart attack.
- Oleh Lysheha, 65, Ukrainian poet, playwright and translator.
- Daniel Sitentu Mpasi, 80, Namibian tribal leader, King of the Uukwangali.
- Jarle Ofstad, 87, Norwegian physician.
- Margaret Ó hÓgartaigh, 47, Irish historian, cancer.
- Lowell Steward, 95, American World War II veteran, member of the Tuskegee Airmen.
- Takeshi Taketsuru, 90, Japanese whisky distiller (Nikka).
- Ivan Vekić, 76, Croatian politician.
- Jean Walraven, 88, American Olympic hurdler.

=== 18 ===
- Yacub Addy, 83, Ghanaian-born American drummer, heart attack.
- Donald J. Albosta, 89, American politician, member of the United States House of Representatives from Michigan's 10th district (1979–1985).
- Virginia Baxter, 82, American figure skater.
- John Beedell, 81, New Zealand-born Canadian Olympic sprint canoer (1960).
- Gideon Ben-Yisrael, 91, Israeli politician, member of the Knesset.
- Franco Bomprezzi, 62, Italian journalist and writer.
- Boyd Brown, 62, American football player.
- Bill J. Dukes, 87, American politician, member of the Alabama House of Representatives (1994–2010), Parkinson's disease.
- Claude Frikart, 92, French Roman Catholic prelate, Auxiliary Bishop of Paris (1986–1997).
- John Fry, 69, American record producer, founder of Ardent Studios, cardiac arrest.
- Jerry Hale, 78, American college basketball coach, complications from Alzheimer's disease.
- Larry Henley, 77, American singer (The Newbeats) and songwriter ("Wind Beneath My Wings").
- Bob Kelly, 74, American football player (Houston Oilers, Kansas City Chiefs, Cincinnati Bengals).
- Ingvar Kjellson, 91, Swedish actor (Heja Roland!), pneumonia.
- Virna Lisi, 78, Italian actress (How to Murder Your Wife, La Reine Margot), cancer.
- Carleton Mabee, 99, American Pulitzer Prize-winning writer.
- Neasa Ní Annracháin, 92, Irish actress.
- Knud Pedersen, 88, Danish artist and resistance fighter.
- Mandy Rice-Davies, 70, British model, figure in the Profumo affair, cancer.
- Harold M. Schulweis, 89, American rabbi and activist.
- Robert Simpson, 102, American meteorologist, co-developer of the Saffir–Simpson hurricane wind scale.
- Deral Teteak, 85, American football player (Green Bay Packers).
- Tsang Siu-fo, 91, Chinese police officer.
- Ed Vereb, 80, American football player (Washington Redskins).
- Ante Žanetić, 78, Croatian footballer, Olympic champion (1960).

=== 19 ===
- Mohammed Aqeel, Pakistani militant, hanged.
- S. S. Balan, 77, Indian media executive (Ananda Vikatan), heart attack.
- Eugen Balint, 87, Romanian Olympic gymnast (1952).
- Charles Bartlett, 93, British artist.
- Philip Bradbourn, 63, British politician, MEP for West Midlands (since 1999), bowel cancer.
- Maureen Duvalier, 88, Bahamian calypso singer.
- Arthur Gardner, 104, American film and television producer (The Rifleman) and actor (All Quiet on the Western Front).
- Pat Holton, 78, Scottish footballer (Motherwell, Hamilton Academical).
- Barbara Jones, 62, Jamaican reggae/gospel singer, leukaemia.
- Roberta Leigh, 87, British author and television producer (Space Patrol).
- Éva Pajor, 77, Hungarian Olympic swimmer.
- John Pettigrew, 80, Australian Olympic footballer.
- Hugh Pond, 91, British soldier and journalist.
- Igor Rodionov, 78, Russian general and politician, Minister of Defence (1996–1997).
- Robert D. San Souci, 68, American children's author and screenwriter (Mulan), head injury.
- Larry Smith, 63, American record producer (Run–D.M.C.).
- Colin Strang, 2nd Baron Strang, 92, British philosopher and peer.
- Doug Thomas, 45, American football player (Seattle Seahawks), heart attack.
- Dick Thornton, 75, American-born Canadian football player (Winnipeg Blue Bombers, Toronto Argonauts), lung cancer.
- Chunilal Vaidya, 97, Indian political activist.

=== 20 ===
- Lucio Abis, 88, Italian politician, President of Sardinia (1970), member of the Italian Senate (1972–1994).
- Maqsudul Alam, 60, Bangladeshi scientist, liver cirrhosis.
- Joe Anderson, 86, British rugby league player (Castleford, Leeds, Featherstone Rovers), kidney cancer.
- Seriki Audu, 23, Nigerian footballer (Lobi Stars), traffic collision.
- Larry Auerbach, 91, American television director (Love of Life, One Life to Live, As the World Turns), complications of glioblastoma.
- Ronnie Bedford, 83, American jazz drummer.
- Zdenko Bego, 81, Croatian rower.
- Donald Charlton Bradley, 90, British chemist.
- Per-Ingvar Brånemark, 85, Swedish orthopedic surgeon, heart attack.
- Ismaaiyl Abdullah Brinsley, 28, American criminal, suicide by gunshot.
- Penny Dann, 50, British children’s book illustrator, cancer.
- George Fisher, 90, American college basketball coach (Austin Peay).
- John Freeman, 99, British politician, journalist, broadcaster and diplomat, MP for Watford (1945–1955), Ambassador to the United States (1969–1971).
- Ranulph Glanville, 68, British architect and cybernetician.
- James L. Kinsey, 80, American chemist.
- Bob Lanier, 89, American businessman and politician, Mayor of Houston, Texas (1992–1998).
- Brian Manley, 85, British engineer.
- Karen McNally, 74, American seismologist.
- Sam Morris, 84, English footballer (Chester City).
- William Lowell Putnam III, 90, American broadcasting executive (Springfield Television), Trustee Emeritus of the Lowell Observatory.
- Gino Pellegrini, 73, Italian scenic designer (2001: A Space Odyssey, Mary Poppins, The Birds) and painter.
- Miodrag B. Protić, 92, Serbian painter.
- Derek Rencher, 82, English ballet dancer.
- Alberto Valdiri, 55, Colombian actor (Doña Bárbara, Yo soy Betty, la fea), heart attack.
- Chip Young, 76, American guitarist.

=== 21 ===
- Morteza Ahmadi, 90, Iranian actor.
- Akhlas Akhlaq, 33, Pakistani-Russian convicted plotter, execution by hanging.
- Anatole Beck, 84, American mathematician.
- Jane Bown, 89, British photographer (The Observer).
- Pedro Brescia Cafferata, 93, Peruvian businessman.
- Sonya Butt, 90, British Special Operations Executive agent.
- Walter De Buck, 80, Belgian singer and sculptor, esophageal cancer.
- Dušan Dragosavac, 95, Yugoslavian politician, Chairman of the League of Communists of Yugoslavia (1981–1982).
- Andy Everest, 90, American football player and coach.
- Horacio Ferrer, 81, Uruguayan poet, broadcaster and tango lyricist, heart failure.
- Chris Hall, 64, Canadian lacrosse coach (Calgary Roughnecks, Vancouver Stealth), throat cancer.
- High Chaparral, 15, Irish Thoroughbred racehorse, Epsom Derby winner (2002), euthanised.
- Åke Johansson, 86, Swedish footballer (IFK Norrköping, national team).
- Udo Jürgens, 80, Austrian composer and singer ("Reach for the Stars"), winner of the Eurovision Song Contest 1966.
- Bruce Lindahl, 95, American politician, member of the Minnesota House of Representatives (1965–1971).
- Tom Nieporte, 86, American golfer.
- Hans Riesel, 85, Swedish mathematician.
- Sitor Situmorang, 91, Indonesian poet and writer.
- Michelle Tisseyre, 96, Canadian television presenter.
- Frank Truitt, 89, American basketball coach (LSU, Kent State).
- Paul Walther, 87, American basketball player (University of Tennessee).
- Billie Whitelaw, 82, English actress (The Omen, The Dark Crystal, Hot Fuzz), pneumonia.
- Rupert Wilkinson, 78, British historian.
- Alan Williams, 84, British politician, MP for Swansea West (1964–2010), Father of the House (2005–2010).

=== 22 ===
- John Robert Beyster, 90, American physicist, founder of Science Applications International Corporation.
- Christine Cavanaugh, 51, American voice actress (Rugrats, Dexter's Laboratory, Babe).
- Joe Cocker, 70, British singer ("With a Little Help from My Friends", "You Are So Beautiful", "Up Where We Belong"), lung cancer.
- Ulpiano Cos Villa, 79, Cuban baseball broadcaster.
- Christopher Davidge, 85, British Olympic rower (1952, 1956, 1960).
- Mayer Eisenstein, 68, American pediatrician and family physician.
- William J. Fishman, 93, British academic.
- Nate Fox, 37, American basketball player, shot.
- Vera Gebuhr, 98, Danish actress (Matador).
- Richard Graydon, 92, British stuntman and stunt coordinator (James Bond, Batman).
- Abdel Aziz Mohamed Hegazy, 91, Egyptian politician, Prime Minister (1974–1975).
- Sarann Knight-Preddy, 94, American businesswoman and civil rights activist.
- Gertrude Kolar, 88, Austrian Olympic gymnast (1948, 1952).
- Maurizio Lotti, 74, Italian politician.
- Rosemary Lowe-McConnell, 93, British biologist.
- Catherine N. Norton, 73, American librarian.
- Moses Otolorin, 67, Nigerian footballer (Shooting Stars), cancer.
- Madhavi Sardesai, 52, Indian academic and writer, cancer.
- Joseph Sargent, 89, American film director (The Taking of Pelham One Two Three, MacArthur, Jaws: The Revenge), heart disease.
- Fritz Sdunek, 67, German professional boxing trainer (Wladimir and Vitali Klitschko, Felix Sturm), heart attack.
- Walter Smishek, 89, Polish-born Canadian politician.
- Brandon Stoddard, 77, American television executive (ABC), bladder cancer.
- Bernard Stone, 87, American politician, Chicago Alderman (1973–2011), complications from a fall.
- Gaddam Venkatswamy, 85, Indian politician.

=== 23 ===
- Evgeny Aramovich Abramyan, 84, Armenian physicist.
- Raymond L. Acosta, 89, American district court judge.
- K. Balachander, 84, Indian filmmaker and playwright.
- Jo Jo Benson, 76, American singer.
- Johnny Bergh, 80, Norwegian producer, director and screenwriter.
- Jacques Chancel, 86, French journalist and writer, cancer.
- Johnnie Colemon, 94, American theologian.
- John Coll, British computer specialist.
- Luis Condomi, 66, Argentine footballer.
- John Denvir, 76, American football player (Denver Broncos).
- Raymond M. Durkin, 78, American politician, complications related to heart failure and emphysema.
- Mike Elliott, 68, British comedian and actor (Goal!, Billy Elliot, Crocodile Shoes), cancer.
- Rustom K. S. Ghandhi, 90, Indian vice admiral.
- Guilford Glazer, 93, American real estate developer and philanthropist.
- Robert V. Hogg, 90, American statistician.
- Jeremy Lloyd, 84, British screenwriter (Are You Being Served?, 'Allo 'Allo!) and actor (Murder on the Orient Express), pneumonia.
- John B. Macdonald, 96, Canadian academic.
- Edward H. Martin, 83, American vice admiral.
- Robert McCabe, 86, American educator.
- Elvina Podchernikova-Elvorti, 86, Russian circus artist and animal trainer.
- Přemek Podlaha, 76, Czech television personality.
- John J. Powers, 96, American food scientist.
- Nigel Priestley, 71, New Zealand earthquake engineer, cancer.
- Debbie Purdy, 51, British campaigner for assisted suicide.
- Hessel Rienks, 82, Dutch politician, member of the House of Representatives (1974–1989).
- Craig Schiffer, 58, American financier (Lehman Brothers), avalanche.
- Jerzy Semkow, 86, Polish-born French conductor.
- John Kennett Starnes, 96, Canadian civil servant, diplomat and novelist.
- Norman Wray, 91, American Roman Catholic missionary, Alzheimer's disease.
- Robert Zoellner, 82, American investor and stamp collector.
- João Nílson Zunino, 68, Brazilian executive, President of Avaí FC (2002–2013).

=== 24 ===
- Ekhlasuddin Ahmed, 74, Bangladeshi children's writer.
- Mack Alston, 67, American football player (Washington Redskins).
- Rubén Amorín, 87, Uruguayan football player and coach (Guatemala national team), Alzheimer's disease.
- Tómas Árnason, 91, Icelandic politician.
- Jeannine Baticle, 93-94, French art historian.
- Leonard Beerman, 93, American Reform rabbi.
- Giovanni Bersani, 100, Italian politician.
- Jacqueline Briskin, 87, British-born American writer.
- Donald Niel Cameron, 97, Canadian politician.
- Anna M. Cienciala, 85, Polish-American historian and author.
- Buddy DeFranco, 91, American jazz clarinet player.
- Reidar Floeng, 96, Norwegian politician.
- Edward Greenspan, 70, Canadian lawyer, heart failure.
- Robert Hall, 87, American basketball player (Harlem Globetrotters).
- Herbert Harris, 88, American politician, member of the U.S. House from Virginia's 8th district (1975–1981).
- Lee Israel, 75, American author and forger.
- Owen H. Johnson, 85, American politician, member of the New York State Senate (1972–2012).
- Yevgeny Korolkov, 84, Russian gymnast, Olympic champion (1952).
- Krzysztof Krauze, 61, Polish film director (The Debt, Plac Zbawiciela), prostate cancer.
- Colin Latimour, 68, New Zealand footballer.
- Sir George Lepping, 67, Solomon Islands politician, Governor-General (1988–1994).
- Arthur Louis, 64, American-born British reggae cross-over musician (Knockin' on Heaven's Door).
- Kathryn A. McCarthy, 90, American physicist.
- Bogdan Mihăilescu, 72, Romanian Olympic water polo player.
- Ihor Nadein, 66, Ukrainian football player and coach.
- Hidetoshi Nakamura, 60, Japanese voice actor (Mobile Suit Victory Gundam, To Love-Ru).
- Alf Næsheim, 88, Norwegian artist and writer.
- Barry Williams, 70, English spree killer.
- Ramsey Muir Withers, 84, Canadian army officer, Chief of the Defence Staff (1980–1983), heart attack.

=== 25 ===
- Alberta Adams, 97, American blues singer.
- N. L. Balakrishnan, 72, Indian actor and photographer.
- Warren Brown, 85, Bermudian sailor and businessman.
- Nand Chaturvedi, 91, Indian poet.
- Chen Shi-chang, 80, Taiwanese politician, multiple organ failure.
- Dave Comer, 58, New Zealand film location scout (The Lord of the Rings, The Hobbit), cancer.
- Louis Boutet de Monvel, 73, French mathematician.
- Geoffrey Eastop, 93, English potter.
- Kjell Hanssen, 82, Norwegian politician.
- John M. Imel, 82, American attorney.
- Bernard Kay, 86, British actor (Doctor Who, Coronation Street, Doctor Zhivago).
- Clayton Little, 81, American politician.
- Bruce Livingston, 87, Australian cricketer.
- Marlene Longenecker, 69, American literary scholar, acute myeloid leukemia.
- Mary F. Lyon, 89, British geneticist.
- George Miller, 92, American politician, Mayor of Tucson, Arizona (1991–1999).
- Tom O'Donnell, 88, New Zealand physician.
- Ricardo Porro, 89, Cuban-born architect.
- David Ryall, 79, English actor (The Singing Detective, Harry Potter and the Deathly Hallows – Part 1, The Elephant Man).
- Jean Stogdon, 86, British campaigner and social worker (Grandparents Plus).
- Tony Wilkinson, 66, British archaeologist.
- Gleb Yakunin, 80, Russian priest and Soviet dissident.

=== 26 ===
- Samson Alcantara, 79, Filipino politician and academic.
- Stanisław Barańczak, 68, Polish poet and academic, pneumonia.
- Al Belletto, 86, American jazz musician.
- Roger L. Bernashe, 87, American politician.
- Dick Dale, 88, American saxophonist and singer (The Lawrence Welk Show).
- Roberto Delmastro, 69, Chilean politician, MP for Valdivia (1998–2010), lung cancer.
- Rajan Devadas, 93, Indian photojournalist.
- James B. Edwards, 87, American politician, Governor of South Carolina (1975–1979), United States Secretary of Energy (1981–1982), complications from a stroke.
- Paul V. Gadola, 85, American senior judge, District Court Judge for the Eastern District of Michigan (1988–2008).
- Lars-Erik Gustafsson, 76, Swedish Olympic athlete.
- Kulsum Saifullah Khan, 91, Pakistani businesswoman and politician.
- Joe Macko, 86, American baseball player and manager.
- Giuseppe Pittau, 86, Italian Roman Catholic prelate, Secretary of Congregation for Catholic Education (1998–2003).
- Geoff Pullar, 79, English Test cricketer (Lancashire).
- Rhodes Reason, 84, American actor (Star Trek, Annie, 77 Sunset Strip).
- Robert Reed, 76, American artist, cancer.
- John Richardson Jr., 93, American political activist, Assistant Secretary of State for Educational and Cultural Affairs (1969–1977).
- Ken Riddington, 92, British television producer (House of Cards).
- Andrew Thomson, 78, British academic and historian.
- Leo Tindemans, 92, Belgian politician, Prime Minister (1974–1978), Minister of Foreign Affairs (1981–1989).

=== 27 ===
- Ben Ammi Ben-Israel, 75, American-born Israeli religious leader (African Hebrew Israelites of Jerusalem).
- Fatima Aouam, 55, Moroccan Olympic runner (1988).
- Hans-Christian Bartel, 82, German violist and composer.
- Graham Cox, 81, British judge.
- Tom Currigan, 94, American politician, Mayor of Denver (1963–1968).
- Carl Neumann Degler, 93, American historian and author, Pulitzer Prize winner (1972).
- Timothy Dowd, 99, Irish-American police official.
- Ulises Estrella, 75, Ecuadorian poet.
- Claude Frank, 89, German-born American pianist, complications of dementia.
- William P. Gerberding, 85, American educator, president of University of Washington.
- Ron Henry, 80, English footballer (Tottenham Hotspur, national team).
- Jacques Hurtubise, 75, Canadian painter.
- Percy Johnson, 85, Australian rules footballer (North Melbourne).
- Ronald Li, 85, Chinese stockbroker, Chairman of the Hong Kong Stock Exchange (1986–1987), cancer.
- Kees Luesink, 61, Dutch politician, Mayor of Doesburg (since 2008).
- Karel Poma, 94, Belgian politician and minister of state, MP (1965–1985), Mayor of Wilrijk (1953–1958).
- Hank Presswood, 93, American baseball player (Cleveland Buckeyes, Kansas City Monarchs).
- Erich Retter, 89, German footballer (VfB Stuttgart, West Germany national team).
- Tomaž Šalamun, 73, Slovene poet.
- Carol Stone, 60, British transgender priest, pancreatic cancer.
- Elaine Summers, 89, American choreographer (Judson Dance Theater) and filmmaker, complications from a fall.
- Hamid Taqavi, 58–59, Iranian brigadier general, shot.
- Bridget Turner, 75, British actress (Doctor Who, Casualty, Z-Cars).
- Jacques Vandenhaute, 83, Belgian politician, Mayor of Woluwe-Saint-Pierre (1983–2007).
- John Webster, 89, British mycologist.

=== 28 ===
- Leelah Alcorn, 17, American transgender girl, suicide by vehicular impact.
- Ruggero J. Aldisert, 95, American judge.
- Paul Barry, 88, American football player.
- Earl Clark, 95, American soldier.
- Chris Dyko, 48, American football player (Chicago Bears), traffic collision.
- Leopoldo Federico, 87, Argentine tango musician.
- Javier Fragoso, 72, Mexican footballer (Club América, national team).
- Vahan Hovhannisyan, 58, Armenian politician.
- Michio Kushi, 88, Japanese-born American scholar, pancreatic cancer.
- Michael C. Murphy, 62, American politician and pastor.
- Frankie Randall, 76, American singer and actor, lung cancer.
- Lewis Rudolph, 95, American businessman, co-founder of Krispy Kreme.
- Richard D. Schafer, 96, American mathematician.
- Jaakko Suikkari, 89, Finnish Olympic sprinter.
- Merrill Womach, 87, American gospel singer.

=== 29 ===
- Hardo Aasmäe, 63, Estonian geographer, entrepreneur and politician.
- Natalie Carter Barraga, 99, American educator and researcher.
- Patricia Hill Burnett, 94, American artist and women's rights activist.
- Ernest de Soto, 91, American lithographer.
- Dorrit Dekk, 97, Czech-British graphic designer.
- Said Khalifa Gouda, 84, Egyptian Olympic weightlifter.
- Syed Hamid, 94, Indian educator, Vice-Chancellor of Aligarh Muslim University (1980–1985).
- Hari Harilela, 92, Indian-born Hong Kong hotelier.
- Simone Iff, 90, French politician.
- Odd Iversen, 69, Norwegian footballer (Rosenborg, national team).
- Jah Paul Jo, 58, American musician (Dread Zeppelin).
- Madhu Kaithapram, 44, Indian film director (Eakantham, Madhya Venal).
- Jaynie Krick, 85, American baseball player (All-American Girls Professional Baseball League).
- Alan Mason, 80, Australian rugby league footballer (Balmain, Canterbury-Bankstown).
- Jack E. McCoy, 85, American politician.
- Jenny Pat, 33, Hong Kong art dealer, accidental drug overdose.
- Johnny Remulla, 81, Filipino politician, Governor of Cavite (1979–1986), multiple organ failure.
- Sir Ivor Richardson, 84, New Zealand jurist, President of the Court of Appeal (1996–2002).
- Ulf Sand, 76, Norwegian politician.
- Howard Schultz, 61, American television producer (Extreme Makeover, Dating Naked).
- Samuel Sentini, 66, Honduran footballer (Olimpia, national team), Alzheimer's disease.
- Leslie Silver, 89, British football executive, Chairman of Leeds United (1983–1996).
- Paul Sprenger, 74, American attorney, heart attack.
- Claude Stone Jr., 88, American politician.
- Bob Usher, 89, American baseball player (Cincinnati Reds).
- André Wohllebe, 52, German Olympic champion sprint canoer (1992) and dual bronze medallist (1988).

=== 30 ===
- Abdul Hamid Zainal Abidin, 70, Malaysian politician, heart attack.
- Frank Atkinson, 90, British museum director (Beamish Museum).
- Terry Becker, 93, American actor (The Twilight Zone, Voyage to the Bottom of the Sea).
- Jake Berthot, 75, American artist.
- Deborah Bone, 51, English mental health nurse, inspired Disco 2000, multiple myeloma.
- Antonio Brack Egg, 74, Peruvian ecologist and politician, Minister of Environment (2008–2011).
- Ronald Bromley, 96, British Army officer.
- Robert Conroy, 76, American science fiction author, winner of the Sidewise Award for Alternate History, thymus cancer.
- Philip Converse, 86, American political scientist.
- Derek Coombs, 83, British politician, MP for Birmingham Yardley (1970–1974).
- Hester A. Davis, 84, American archaeologist.
- Roland de Corneille, 87, Canadian Anglican priest and politician.
- Angela Delevingne, 102, English aristocrat and socialite.
- Yolande Donlan, 94, American-born British actress.
- George B. Fitch, 66, American politician, Mayor of Warrenton, Virginia (1998–2014), cancer.
- Jim Galloway, 78, Scottish-born Canadian jazz clarinet and saxophone player.
- Allan Garraway, 88, British railway manager.
- Patrick Gowers, 78, English composer.
- Joan Israel, 84, American psychotherapist.
- Jerry Jost, 85, American sound engineer (The Turning Point, Logan's Run, Grease).
- Marian Jurczyk, 79, Polish politician and trade union activist (Solidarity), Mayor of Szczecin (1998–2000, 2002–2006).
- Beau Kazer, 63, Canadian actor (The Young and the Restless, Taxi Driver).
- Igor Kiselyov, 35, Russian footballer (Biolog-Novokubansk Progress, Torpedo Moscow), heart failure.
- Dick Loggere, 93, Dutch Olympic field hockey player, silver medallist (1952) and bronze medallist (1948).
- Tomiko Miyao, 88, Japanese novelist.
- J. B. Moraes, 81, Indian poet and writer.
- Rosemary Mulligan, 73, American politician, member of the Illinois House of Representatives (1993–2013).
- Luise Rainer, 104, German-born American actress (The Great Ziegfeld, The Good Earth), Academy Award winner (1936, 1937), pneumonia.
- Walter Roque, 77, Uruguayan football player (Uruguay national team) and coach (Venezuela national team).
- Milton Rosen, 99, American rocket scientist and NASA executive, complications from prostate cancer.
- Henry Strzelecki, 75, American musician, traffic collision.
- T. E. Vasudevan, 97, Indian film producer (Snehaseema, Kavyamela).
- B. G. Verghese, 87, Indian journalist and newspaper editor (Hindustan Times, The Indian Express).
- Jan V. White, 86, American graphic designer.

=== 31 ===
- W. Raymond Beck, 90, American politician.
- Jim Bennett, 70, Irish hurler.
- Giovanni Del Rio, 89, Italian politician, President of Sardinia (1967–1970, 1973–1976).
- Jimmy Dunn, 91, Scottish footballer (Wolverhampton Wanderers, Derby County).
- Edward Herrmann, 71, American actor (Gilmore Girls, Richie Rich, The Lost Boys), brain cancer.
- Abdullah Hussain, 94, Malaysian novelist (Interlok).
- Keith Jenkinson, 88, Australian rules footballer (South Melbourne).
- Ferenc A. Jolesz, 68, Hungarian-American physician and scientist, pulmonary embolism.
- Michael Kennedy, 88, British biographer, journalist and music critic.
- Nejat Konuk, 86, Cypriot politician, Prime Minister of Northern Cyprus (1976–1978, 1983–1985).
- Norbert Leser, 81, Austrian jurist, political scientist and social philosopher.
- Marie Smallface Marule, 70, Canadian-Blackfoot academic administrator, activist, and educator, President of Red Crow Community College (since 1992).
- James McNaughton Hester, 90, American academic, President of New York University (1962–1975).
- Romanus Orjinta, 33, Nigerian footballer.
- Luis Oruezábal, 62, Argentine footballer (Vélez Sársfield, Granada, national team), Pan American Games champion (1971), carbon monoxide poisoning.
- Norm Phelps, 75, American author and animal rights activist.
- Washington Rodríguez, 70, Uruguayan Olympic bantamweight boxer, bronze medallist (1964).
- Kamala Sinha, 82, Indian politician and diplomat.
- S. Arthur Spiegel, 94, American federal judge.
- Valerian Wellesley, 8th Duke of Wellington, 99, British aristocrat and Army officer.
