= Senator Hunt (disambiguation) =

Lester C. Hunt (1892–1954), U.S. Senator from Wyoming from 1949 to 1954. Senator Hunt may refer to:

- Alvah Hunt (1790s–1858), New York State Senate
- George F. Hunt (1831–1888), Wisconsin State Senate
- George Hunt (attorney) (1841–1901), Illinois State Senate
- Jarvis Hunt (politician) (1904–1994), Massachusetts State Senate
- John E. Hunt (1908–1989), New Jersey State Senate
- Megan Hunt (politician) (born 1986), Nebraska State Senate
- Neal Hunt (born 1942), North Carolina State Senate
- Samuel Furman Hunt (1844–1907), Ohio State Senate
- Stuart Hunt (1927–2014), Vermont State Senate
- Walter Hunt (politician) (1868–1942), Wisconsin State Senate
