= Dunsworth =

Dunsworth is a surname shared by:

- Brian Dunsworth (1925–2014), Canadian football player
- John Dunsworth (1946–2017), Canadian actor and comedian
- Molly Dunsworth (born 1990), Canadian actress

== See also ==
- Sarah Dunsworth-Nickerson (born 1976), Canadian actress and costume designer
