= Earl Clark (disambiguation) =

Earl Clark (born 1988) is an American professional basketball player.

Earl Clark may also refer to:

- Earl Clark (American football) (1891–1959), American football player and coach
- Earl Clark (baseball) (1907–1938), American Major League Baseball outfielder
- Earl Clark (US Army officer) (1919–2014), American military officer who helped to create the skiing industry
- Dutch Clark (Earl Harry Clark, 1906–1978), American football player and coach

== See also ==
- Mel Clark (Melvin Earl Clark, 1926–2014), American Major League Baseball outfielder
- Mike E. Clark (Mike Earl Clark), American record producer and DJ
