= Lin Ming-yi =

Taiwanese politician

Lin Ming-yi MLY
- 林明義

Member of the Legislative Yuan
- In office 1 February 1993 – 31 January 2002
- Constituency: Yunlin County

Personal details
- Born: 1 June 1954 Yunlin County, Taiwan
- Died: 20 June 2007 (aged 53) Huwei, Yunlin, Taiwan
- Party: Non-Partisan Solidarity Union (since 2004)
- Other political affiliations: Kuomintang (until 2004)
- Education: Tamkang University
- Occupation: politician

Lin Ming-yi (Chinese: 林明義; pinyin: Lín Míngyì; 1 June 1954 – 20 June 2007) was a Taiwanese politician.

== Life and career ==
Born in Yunlin County, Lin attended elementary school in Huwei, then Liyang Private Junior High and Chianan Private Vocational High School. He then studied at Tamkang University.

Lin began his political career by serving on the Yunlin County Council. He then ran for the Legislative Yuan in 1992, and won reelection twice in 1995 and 1998. Throughout his tenure in politics, Lin was linked to the Taiwanese underworld. Lin was especially close to Chen Shi-chang, himself a former legislator. Lin Ming-yi was charged with breach of trust in 2003, as a result of an investigation into Liu Tai-ying. The following year, Lin represented the Non-Partisan Solidarity Union as a legislative candidate, but did not win election.

Lin was treated for liver cancer at National Taiwan University Hospital in 2007, and died at home in Huwei on 20 June 2007, aged 53. His funeral was held on 19 July 2007.
