= Judith Baker =

American judoka

Judith Baker (died December 17, 2014, age 75) was an American female judoka. Baker was a four-time national champion and a 4th degree black belt. For many years, the ceiling in rank for women in judo was 5th degree.

== Martial arts career ==
In the second National USJA Women's Judo Championship, she competed in the brown belt technique division and was the division champion. At the Ju-no-kata division, she won first with Joan Millay. In 1977, at the Women's Judo National, she worked with Linda Stoops and took first in Ju No Kata and Nage-no-kata and second in Katame-no-kata. She earned second place in those divisions in the US Women's International Judo invitational.

She was recognized as a Judo player, Kata Champion, and coach in Ohio and the nation.

== Personal life ==
Baker graduated in 1962 from the University of Cincinnati. She died on December 17, 2014.
