= Donald S. Malecki =

- Born: May 15, 1933; Syracuse, New York
- Died: December 12, 2014 (aged 81); Fort Thomas, Kentucky
- Citizenship: United States
- Occupations: Insurance Author and Expert
- Spouse: Norma Plotti Malecki

Donald S. Malecki (May 15, 1933 – December 12, 2014) was an author and speaker noted for expertise in Property and Casualty insurance.

== Biography ==
Malecki was born in Syracuse, New York on May 15, 1933. He served for four years in the United States Air Force, participating in the Korean War and being discharged in 1955. That year he married Norma Plotti. He graduated from Syracuse University with a Bachelor of Science degree. Malecki started in insurance with the Fireman's Insurance Company in 1960 as a fire underwriter trainee. Later worked for Continental Insurance Company as supervising casualty underwriter. He began writing for National Underwriter in 1966 and continued with that magazine until 1984, eventually becoming editor. He received his Chartered Property Casualty Underwriter designation in 1970. In 1975 he was approached by the American Institute for Chartered Property Casualty Underwriter to write his first book. This book, Commercial Liability Risk Management and Insurance, became the first of three books written by Malecki which are now currently part of the curriculum. He formed his own consulting company in 1977, and that year also began writing for RoughNotes. He had also written for the International Risk Management Institute and served on the Commercial Lines Industry Liaison Panel of Insurance Services Office, while publishing the newsletter Malecki on Insurance. In the 2000s he was a regular speaker at the annual CPCU convention. He died on December 12, 2014 At the time of his death he was a principal at Malecki Deimling Nielander and Associates, LLC.

== Books ==
- Commercial Liability Risk Management and Insurance (1978)
- Insuring the Lease Exposure (1981)
- The CGL Book (1986)
- The Additional Insured Book (1991)
- The MCS-90 Book: Truckers Versus Insurers and the Government Makes Three (2004)
