= Bogdan Mihăilescu =

Romanian water polo player

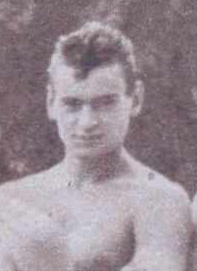
- Mihăilescu in 1963

Personal information
- Nationality: Romanian
- Born: 6 March 1942 Bucharest, Romania
- Died: 24 December 2014

Sport
- Sport: Water polo

Bogdan Mihăilescu (6 March 1942 – 24 December 2014) was a Romanian water polo player. He competed in the men's tournament at the 1972 Summer Olympics.
