= Ferenc A. Jolesz =

Hungarian-American physician

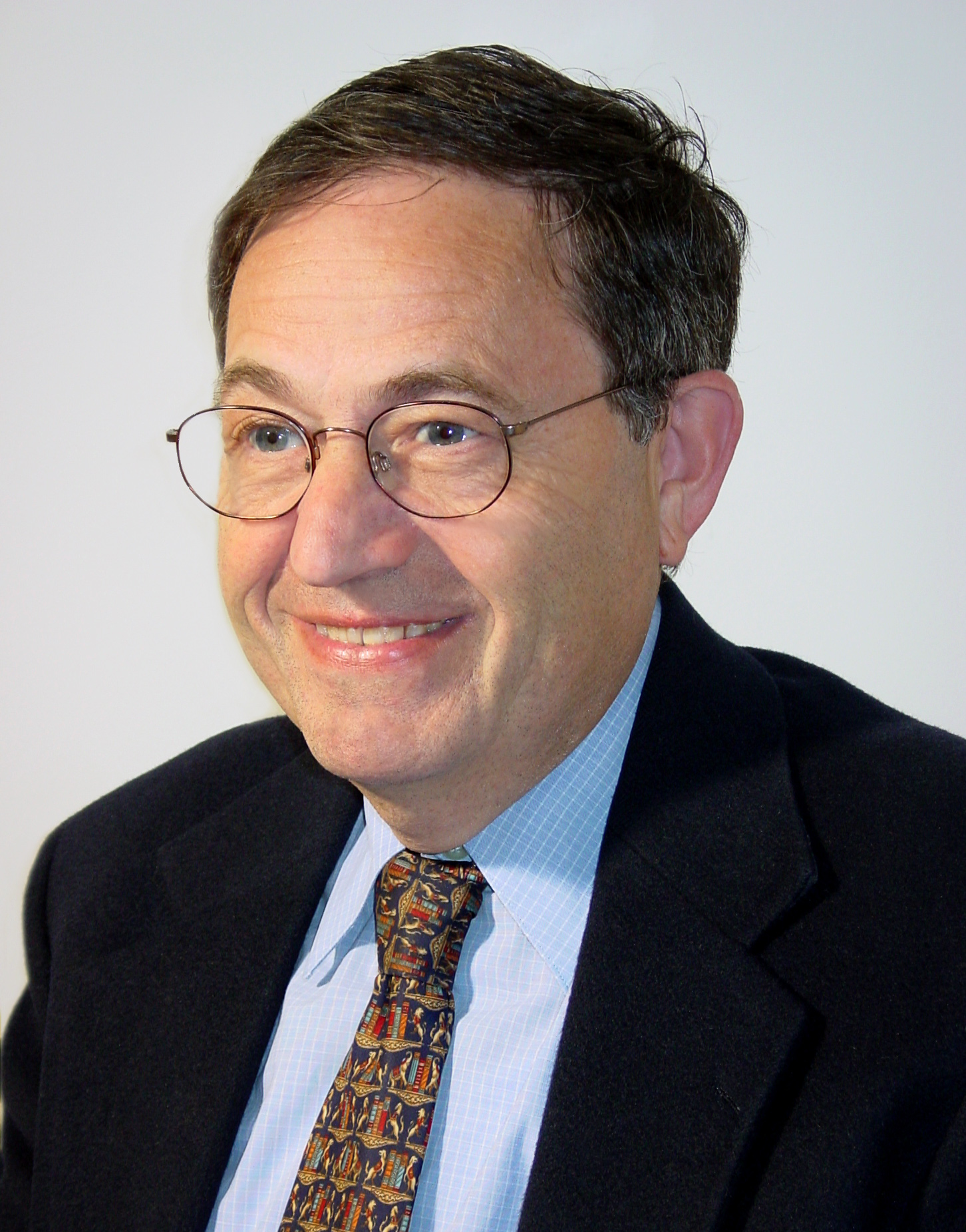
- Portrait of Ferenc A. Jolesz
- Born: May 21, 1946; Budapest, Hungary
- Died: December 31, 2014 (aged 68); Hollywood, Florida, United States
- Education: Semmelweis University, Budapest, Hungary
- Known for: Image-Guided Therapy
- Scientific career
- Fields: Medical research, Radiology, Biomedical engineering
- Workplaces: Harvard Medical School; Brigham and Women's Hospital

Ferenc Andras Jolesz (May 21, 1946 – December 31, 2014) was a Hungarian-American physician and scientist best known for his research on image guided therapy, the process by which information derived from diagnostic imaging is used to improve the localization and targeting of diseased tissue to monitor and control treatment during surgical and interventional procedures. He pioneered the field of Magnetic Resonance Imaging-guided interventions and introduced of a variety of new medical procedures based on novel combinations of imaging and therapy delivery.

== Early life and education ==
Jolesz was born and raised in Hungary. He graduated summa cum laude in Medicine from Semmelweis University in 1971. He served as a research fellow in biomedical engineering and computer sciences at K. Kando College of Electrical Engineering in Budapest and completed a residency in Neurosurgery at Budapest's Institute of Neurosurgery.

After moving to Boston, MA, USA in 1979, he successively worked as a research fellow in the Department of Neurology at Massachusetts General Hospital and Boston Biomedical Research Institute, as a research fellow in the Department of Physiology at Harvard Medical School, and completed a residency in Diagnostic Radiology and a fellowship in Neuroradiology at Brigham and Women's Hospital from 1982 to 1985.

== Professional life ==
Jolesz became director of the Division of Magnetic Resonance Imaging at The Brigham and Women's Hospital in 1988, and in 1989, associate professor of radiology at Harvard Medical School. In 1993, he established the Image-Guided Therapy Program at The Brigham and Women's Hospital to advance the use of imaging for enhancing minimally invasive surgical procedures and other means of therapy delivery. The program includes the Surgical Planning Laboratory, the Focused Ultrasound Surgery Laboratory, and intraoperative imaging suites. In 1998, Jolesz was appointed the first incumbent B. Leonard Holman Chair in Radiology at Harvard Medical School, and in 2000, was appointed Vice Chair for Research for the Department of Radiology at The Brigham and Women's Hospital. In 2001, he was named director of the Advanced Imaging Center of Harvard Medical School's NeuroDiscovery Center.

=== Professional training ===
==== Budapest, Hungary ====
- 1972-1973: Research Fellow, Dept. of Biomedical Engineering, K. Kando College of Electrical Engineering
- 1975-1979: Resident, Dept. of Neurosurgery, Institute of Neurosurgery

==== Boston, MA ====
- 1979-1980: Research Fellow, Dept. of Neurology, Massachusetts General Hospital and Boston Biomedical Research Institute
- 1980-1982: Research Fellow, Dept. of Physiology, Harvard Medical School
- 1982: Clinical Fellow, Dept. of Neuroradiology, Brigham and Women's Hospital
- 1982-1985: Resident, Diagnostic Radiology, Dept. of Radiology, Brigham and Women's Hospital

=== Academic appointments ===
==== Budapest, Hungary ====
- 1971-1973: Instructor, Dept. of Physiology, College of Physical Education
- 1973-1974: Assistant Professor, Dept. of Physiology, College of Physical Education
- 1973-1975: Research Associate, Department of Physics, K. Kando College of Electrical Engineering
- 1974-1975: Adjunct Professor, Department of Physiology, College of Physical Education

==== Harvard Medical School ====
- 1981-1982: Research Associate in Physiology
- 1985-1989: Assistant Professor of Radiology
- 1989-1996: Associate Professor of Radiology
- 1996-1998: Professor of Radiology
- 1998-2014: B. Leonard Holman Professor of Radiology

=== Hospital appointments ===
- 1985: Staff Neuroradiologist, Brigham and Women's Hospital
- 1985: Radiologist, Brigham and Women's Hospital
- 1987-1988: Director, Neuro MR Imaging Section, Brigham and Women's Hospital
- 1987-1995: Consultant, Neuroradiology, West Roxbury VA Hospital
- 1988-2014: Director, Division of MRI, Brigham and Women's Hospital
- 1993-2014: Director, Image-Guided Therapy Program, Brigham and Women's Hospital
- 2000-2009: Vice-chairman of Research, Dept. of Radiology, Brigham and Women's Hospital
- 2001-2014: Director, Advanced Imaging Center, Harvard Medical School, NeuroDiscovery Center

== Research ==
The broad focus of Jolesz's research was the integration of imaging technologies into a variety of medical disciplines beyond the traditional role of Radiology. He drew from the areas of basic and clinical neuroscience, imaging physics, MRI, three-dimensional medical visualization, robotics, computer vision, and therapy delivery technologies to pioneer a wide variety of clinical techniques in image-guided therapy. He cultivated basic research in each of these areas and integrated the results with the goal of augmenting the physician's ability to deliver treatment to his or her patient.

Where they did not previously exist, Jolesz led the development and implementation of new approaches to image processing and analysis, visualization, and navigation techniques for improving the diagnosis and treatment of neurologic and oncologic diseases. He then combined the most promising results into research clinical systems where new procedures could be developed, evaluated and refined.

=== MR Physics ===
Jolesz led an MR Physics team to develop new kinds of MR acquisition techniques for use in conventional and intraoperative MR use. These techniques include Fast Spin Echo (FSE), which can be used for all weightings in all body regions and parts, permits decreased scan times, and allows for either higher resolution or better signal to noise ratios.

=== Intraoperative MRI ===
Jolesz initiated and led an academic industrial partnership of clinical and technical colleagues in designing and developing the first magnetic resonance image-guided unit for image-guided brain tumor resection that was installed at The Brigham and Women's Hospital in 1993.

The team, consisting of members of the departments of Radiology and Otorhinolaryngology and the neurosurgical service at BWH and industrial collaborators from General Electric Medical Systems, developed and built an entire operating suite built around a specially designed 0.5 Tesla MRI scanner that allowed ongoing patient scans to be obtained during a surgical procedure. Information from the scans, including imaging data registered with three-dimensional models created from pre-operative imaging, was available to the surgical team to help guide the procedure. The system became known as MRT (for Magnetic Resonance Therapy) at BWH and commercialized by GE Medical Systems as the GE Signa SP.

MRT provided a successful testbed to show that real-time image guidance for surgical and interventional procedures improves lesion targeting accuracy, enables visualization of complete lesion removal or destruction and sparing of surrounding normal tissue, and reduces procedural morbidity. There are now (2015) more than one hundred MR equipped operating rooms throughout the world.

=== Focused ultrasound therapy ===
Jolesz pioneered, and with his colleagues, introduced the first MRI-guided focused ultrasound surgical (MRgFUS) procedure, a completely non-invasive procedure that can, by thermo-coagulation induced by local ultrasound, destroy solid tumors. MRgFUS has wide potential application to surgery, radiation oncology, pharmacology, and the neurosciences due to its non-invasive nature and the fact that the positioning of the ultrasound's focus and response of tissue to ultrasound heating can be continuously monitored by MRI.

As of 2015, there are more than one hundred MRgFUS therapy delivery systems installed worldwide.

One particularly promising application for MRgFUS envisioned by Jolesz is its use to open the blood-brain barrier, allowing drugs to be delivered to the brain and neural system to provide otherwise-impossible treatments. Examples of this kind of therapy include chemotherapy in neuro-oncology, gene therapy, and targeted drug delivery and neuromodulation for psychiatry and neuropharmacology.

=== National Center for Image Guided Therapy ===
In 2005 the National Institutes of Health established National Center for Image Guided Therapy at The Brigham and Women's Hospital, a realization of Jolesz's vision to explore the clinical application of image-guided therapy procedures and techniques. NCIGT is a resource center for worldwide dissemination, collaboration, and education for a broad spectrum of image-guided therapy activities.

=== AMIGO ===
Based on the success of MRT and the availability of new technologies in surgical guidance, visualization, robotics, and multi-modality image acquisition, Jolesz conceived the idea for a comprehensive operating suite that included access to many different kinds of imaging and therapy delivery tools in order to prototype new kinds of surgical procedures. Such a system would expand the ability of the surgeon to deliver highly targeted therapy to a patient in a less invasive manner, while better monitoring the efficacy of the treatment during the procedure using intraoperative imaging.

In 2011, Jolesz and colleagues at NCIGT completed the installation of the Advanced Multimodality Image Guided Operating suite (AMIGO) at Brigham and Women’s Hospital (BWH). The facility integrates multiple imaging modalities, including MRI, X-ray computed tomography, ultrasound, positron emission tomography (PET), and mass spectrometry, within a three-room operating suite.

As of January 2019, more than 2057 surgical and minimally invasive interventional procedures have been completed in AMIGO, ranging from MR-guided prostate biopsies, brachytherapies, and kidney tumor cryoablations to PET/CT-guided liver microwave ablations, MRI-guided brain tumor resections and deep brain stimulations.

== Publications ==
Jolesz's research has been published in more than 900 articles in peer-reviewed journals, as well as in book chapters and review articles. In 2014, he edited the book Intraoperative Imaging and Image-Guided Therapy, which discusses developments and techniques in image-guided biomedical research and their clinical applications.

=== Awards and honors ===
- 1985: Research Career Development Award, Brigham and Women's Hospital
- 1991: Visions in Medicine Award, General Electric Medical Systems
- 1996: Honorary Doctorate, Pannon Agricultural University, Kaposvar, Hungary
- 1997: Honorary Member, Hungarian Neuroradiology Society and Hungarian Society of Radiology
- 2002: Outstanding Scientist Award, Radiological Society of North America
- 2002: Szentgyorgyi Award, Hungarian Academy of Sciences
- 2002: Honorary Doctorate, Semmelweis Medical School, Budapest, Hungary
- 2005: Pioneer in Medicine Award, World Brain Mapping Foundation (WBMF)
- 2006: Fulbright Research Scholarship
- 2007: Gold Medal, International Society of Magnetic Resonance in Medicine
- 2007: Establishment of Ferenc A. Jolesz Chair in Radiology, Brigham and Women's Hospital, Harvard Medical School
- 2011: Partners in Excellence Award, Partners HealthCare (AMIGO team leader)
- 2012: Boston Globe 100: Most innovative in Massachusetts. A higher vision for the O.R.
- 2012: Council of Distinguished Investigators, Academy of Radiology Research
- 2013: Research Innovation Award, Brigham and Women's Hospital
- 2014: A. Clifford Barger Excellence in Mentoring Award, Harvard Medical School

== Death ==
Jolesz died unexpectedly due to a pulmonary embolism on December 31, 2014, while vacationing in Florida. He is survived by his wife, Dr. Anna Jolesz, and daughters, Dr. Marta Jolesz and Ms. Klara Jolesz.
