= Chartered Property Casualty Underwriter =

Professional designation

Chartered Property Casualty Underwriter (CPCU) is a professional designation in property-casualty insurance and risk management, administered by The Institutes (AKA American Institute for Chartered Property Casualty Underwriters). Achieving the designation requires completion of eight courses covering topics such as risk management, insurance operations, business law, finance and accounting, property insurance, and liability insurance. Held by over 90,000 professionals, the CPCU designation is the most distinguished designation offered by The Institutes for underwriters and risk management in the insurance industry.

A designee must pass an exam on each topic and can choose between a personal insurance and a commercial insurance concentration, which includes one elective of their choosing, as well as one ethics course. These exams are standardized, 65 minutes multiple choice, objective-type exams. The exams are known for their difficulty.

CPCU designation holders are also bound by a Professional Code of Ethics, and must satisfy educational and experience requirements. Designation holders have formed a professional society, the Chartered Property Casualty Underwriter (CPCU) Society. In addition to annual national meetings which serve as a conferment ceremony, the society has over 150 local chapters throughout the country.
