= Bruce Lindahl =

American politician

Bruce Murray Lindahl (June 21, 1919 – December 21, 2014) was an American educator, politician, and labor activist.

Born in Brookings, South Dakota, Lindahl served in the United States Army Air Forces during World War II. Lindahl received his bachelor's degree from the University of Minnesota and taught science. He was also involved in the teachers union. Lindahl served in the Minnesota House of Representatives from 1965 to 1971 from Saint Paul, Minnesota and was involved in the Democratic Party.
