= Gino Pellegrini =

Italian set designer and painter (1941–2014)

- Born: 13 August 1941; Lugo di Vicenza, Italy
- Died: 20 December 2014 (aged 73)
- Known for: Painting

Gino Pellegrini (1941 – 20 December 2014) was an Italian film set designer and painter.

Born in Lugo di Vicenza, at age 16 Pellegrini moved to Los Angeles, where he attended the architecture course at UCLA and then achieved a master's degree in Fine Arts. After a brief period of work in the poster advertising field, he entered the cinema industry, where he worked as a scenic painter and set designer. His film works include 2001: A Space Odyssey, Mary Poppins, Fantastic Voyage, Guess Who's Coming to Dinner, The Birds, and West Side Story. After about fifteen years in California, in 1972 he came back to Italy, where he worked in the fields of stage design, video filmmaking and documentaries. In San Giovanni in Persiceto, in two stages between the 1980s and the 1990s, he realized the "Piazzetta degli inganni" ("Little square of deception"), consisting in some trompe-l'œil scenes painted on the walls of the houses around Piazza Betlemme (Betlemme square).
