= Cotton Hodges =

American racing driver (1926–2014)

- Born: May 12, 1926; Hollywood, Florida, U.S.
- Died: December 15, 2014 (aged 88); Easley, South Carolina, U.S.

NASCAR Cup Series career
- 3 races run over 3 years
- Best finish: 145th (1963)
- First race: 1953 Race No. 2 (Daytona Beach)
- Last race: 1963 Race No. 1 (Birmingham)
Wins	Top tens	Poles
0	0	0

James Elmer Hodges (May 12, 1926 – December 15, 2014), better known as Cotton Hodges, was an American NASCAR Grand National Series driver from Hollywood, Florida. He raced in three Grand National races between 1953 and 1963.

== Racing career ==
Hodges was a well known local driver at the track off Hollywood Boulevard and later became one of the early NASCAR (National Association of Stock Car Racers). He raced in NASCAR off and on from 1953 to 1963 and he participated in three races. He competed at the Daytona Beach Road Course in 1953 starting 25th and finishing 33rd. Hodges' raced in his second Grand National race at Palm Beach Speedway in 1954; he moved from his 25th starting position to finish 18th. Hodges' final NASCAR race happened in about nine years later in 1963 when he started and finished in 21st position at Fairgrounds Raceway in Birmingham, Alabama.

== Personal life and death ==
Hodges died in Easley, South Carolina on December 15, 2014, at the age of 92.

== Motorsports career results ==
=== NASCAR ===
(key) (Bold – Pole position awarded by qualifying time. Italics – Pole position earned by points standings or practice time. * – Most laps led.)

==== Grand National Series ====
NASCAR Grand National Series results
Year	Team	No.	Make	1	2	3	4	5	6	7	8	9	10	11	12	13	14	15	16	17	18	19	20	21	22	23	24	25	26	27	28	29	30	31	32	33	34	35	36	37	38	39	40	41	42	43	44	45	46	47	48	49	50	51	52	53	54	55	NGNC	Pts	Ref
1953	Jim Fowler	30	Olds	PBS	DAB; 33	HAR	NWS	CLT	RCH	CCS	LAN	CLB	HCY	MAR	PMS	RSP	LOU	FFS	LAN	TCS	WIL	MCF	PIF	MOR	ATL	RVS	LCF	DAV	HBO	AWS	PAS	HCY	DAR	CCS	LAN	BLF	WIL	NWS	MAR	ATL																			173rd	13	
1954	Cotton Hodges	77	Olds	PBS; 18	DAB	JSP	ATL	OSP	OAK	NWS	HBO	CCS	LAN	WIL	MAR	SHA	RSP	CLT	GAR	CLB	LND	HCY	MCF	WGS	PIF	AWS	SFS	GRS	MOR	OAK	CLT	SAN	COR	DAR	CCS	CLT	LAN	MAS	MAR	NWS																			NA	–	
1963	Wildcat Williams	9	Ford	BIR; 21	GGS	THS	RSD	DAY	DAY	DAY	PIF	AWS	HBO	ATL	HCY	BRI	AUG	RCH	GPS	SBO	BGS	MAR	NWS	CLB	THS	DAR	ODS	RCH	CLT	BIR	ATL	DAY	MBS	SVH	DTS	BGS	ASH	OBS	BRR	BRI	GPS	NSV	CLB	AWS	PIF	BGS	ONA	DAR	HCY	RCH	MAR	DTS	NWS	THS	CLT	SBO	HBO	RSD	145th	80	
