= Elvina Podchernikova-Elvorti =

Russian performer and trainer

Elvina Mikhailovna Podchernikova-Elvorti
- Born: Elvina M. Podchernikova-Elvorti; October 7, 1928; Kostroma, USSR
- Died: December 23, 2014 (aged 86); Moscow, Russia
- Occupations: Circus artist, Animal training
- Years active: 1943-2000

Elvina Mikhailovna Podchernikova-Elvorti (Russian: Эльвина Михайловна Подчерникова-Эльворти) was a People's Artist of Russia, circus performer, trainer, public figure.

== Biography and career ==
Elvorti was born into the family of Mikhail Dmitrievich and Nina Andreevna Podchernikovs (Elvorti was the circus pseudonym of the Podchernikov family, which later became their official surname).

Since 1943 she worked with her father in the attraction "In the Ice of the Arctic" with polar bears and absorbed his experience as a trainer. During the war she participated in circus tours in her father's shows, in concerts at hospitals of Saratov, Kazan, Kostroma, Kalinin, Yaroslavl, Gorky.

Since 1947 she acted as a cycling artist (velofigurist) in her husband's, V. Asmus' show. In 1952 she accepted a group of trained brown bears from Boris Eder, acting as a writer and director she prepared with them the attraction "Amusing Bears" and toured with it for 45 years. The animals played funny and complex tricks on two parallel ropes at an altitude of 5 meters.

She was author and producer of children's plays: "Fairy Tale of the Wizard of Winter", "The Adventures of Princess Nezabudki", etc.

She was part of the trade union committee of the Russian State Circus Company for more than 40 years. She retired in 2000. Since 1993, she headed the regional public organization "Society of Disabled Circus Artists 'Beneficence and Charity'. Her father Mikhail, was paralyzed for 20 years from being mauled by polar bears, which was why her philanthropic organization was particularly personal.

She died on December 23, 2014 at the age of 86. She was buried at Vostryakovskoe cemetery next to her father and husband.

== Family ==
- Father - Mikhail Dmitrievich Elvorti (18.10.1900 - 23.12.1981), Honored Artist of the RSFSR (1939);
  - Worked in the circus in 1922 (number on the bar with M. Oltens,
  - in 1923-1943 - director and catcher in air flight numbers,
  - in 1943-1947, as a polar bear trainer in the attraction "In the Arctic Ice").
  - since 1947 was a director of traveling circuses.
- Mother - Nina Andreevna Elvorti-Dmitrieva (20.9.1909 - 15.7.1995);
  - After graduating from the musical college in 1947-1957 worked as a lecturer in the zoo, from 1958 she headed the production part in circuses.
- Brother - Yuri (born 5.4.1945);
  - After graduating from the college of circus and variety art, he worked as an acrobat, was head of the show "Folding boards", participated in the eccentric miniature number "Cheburashka";
  - After retirement was an assistant in the attraction "Funny Bears."
- Husband - Wilhelm Asmus (1928-19.4.2014), cycling artist, trainer.
  - He was born in Bryansk. He began his professional activity in 1942 with Vartanov's "Velofigurists" number.
  - Since 1973 was trainer in the attraction "Funny Bears."
- Son - Yuri Vilgelmovich Elvorti (born 4.4.1948);
  - In 1973 he graduated from the Moscow Institute of Physical Culture;
  - Worked in his father's cycling troupe, in the gymnasts' number on Filatov's rings;
  - Married to Ilona Viktorovna Elvorti-Filatova (born 26.9.1956), together with her created an attraction "Birds", containing original tricks with birds, dogs and bears.
- Grandson - Edward (born 16.10.1976) - aerial gymnast.

== Awards ==
- Honored Artist of the RSFSR (1969)
- People's Artist of Russia (1994)
