= Gavril Nagy =

Romanian water polo player (1932–2014)

Personal information
- Nationality: Romanian
- Born: 21 August 1932; Târgu Mureș, Romania
- Died: 4 December 2014 (aged 82); Los Angeles, California, United States

Sport
- Sport: Water polo

Gavril Nagy (21 August 1932 – 4 December 2014) was a Romanian water polo player. He competed in the men's tournament at the 1956 Summer Olympics.
