= Merrill Womach =

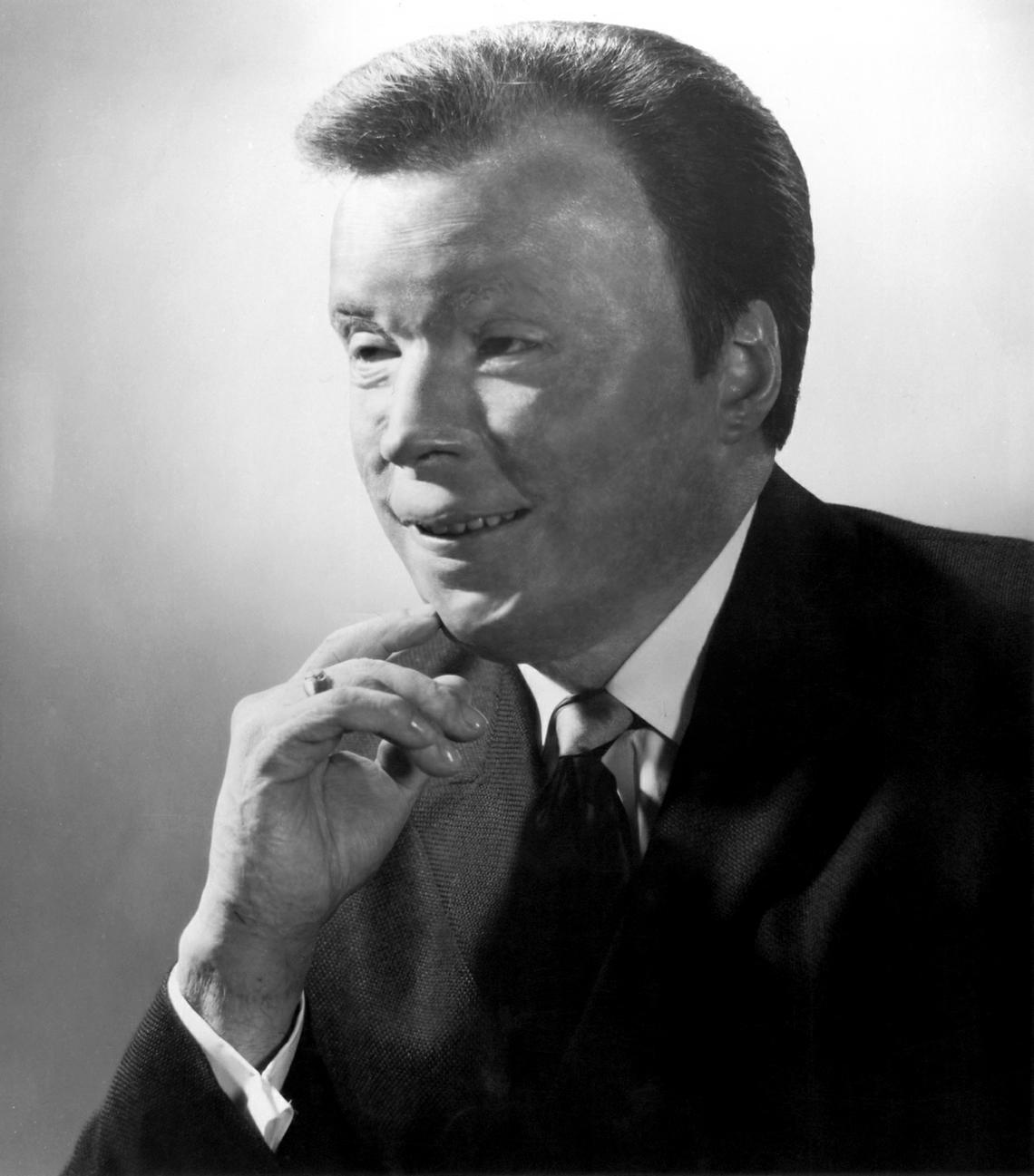
- Merrill Womach in 1969

Background information
- Born: February 7, 1927; Spokane, Washington
- Died: December 28, 2014 (aged 87) Spokane, Washington

Merrill Womach (February 7, 1927 – December 28, 2014) was an American undertaker, organist and gospel singer, notable both for founding National Music Service (now Global Distribution Network, Inc.), which provided recorded music to funeral homes across America, and for surviving a Thursday, November 23, 1961 plane crash in Beaver Marsh, Oregon that left him disfigured with third degree burns on his hands and his entire head.

Womach authorized an autobiography of his recovery titled Tested by Fire, co-authored with his former wife Virginia with help from Mel and Lyla White. A documentary film titled He Restoreth My Soul was also made about Womach's accident and subsequent recovery.

He died in his sleep on December 28, 2014. He was born and died in Spokane, Washington.

== Discography ==
- 1960 My Song
- 1967 I Believe in Miracles
- 1968 Merrill Womach Sings Christmas Carols
- 1969 A Time For Us
- 1970 Surely Goodness and Mercy
- 1973 I Stood At Calvary
- 1974 Happy Again
- 1976 Mine Eyes Have Seen The Glory
- 1977 In Concert
- 1977 In Quartet
- 1977 New Life Collectible
- 1979 Images Of Christmas
- 1979 My Favorite Hymns
- 1980 Reborn
- 1981 Classical
- 1981 I'm A Miracle, Lord
- 1981 Merrill
- 1983 Feelin' Good
- 1985 Thank You, Lord
