= Lyudmila Perepyolkina =

Soviet-Russian actress

- Born: Lyudmila Alekseevna Perepyolkina; 2 February 1930; RSFSR, USSR
- Died: 2 December 2014 (aged 84); Moscow, Russia
- Occupation: Actress
- Years active: 1953–2014

Lyudmila Alekseevna Perepyolkina (Russian: Людмила Алексеевна Перепёлкина; 2 February 1930 – 2 December 2014) was a Soviet-Russian stage and film actress.

== Biography ==
Perepyolkina graduated from the Boris Shchukin Theatre Institute. She appeared on stage in works by such authors as Goncharov, Dunayev and Efros. She died on 2 December 2014, aged 84, at the Botkin Hospital in Moscow.

== Selected stage roles ==
- Three Sisters (Olga)
- At the Ball of Fortune (Marie)
- The Visit of Ladies (Clara)
- Counterfeit Coins (Natasha)
- Restless Hero of the Day (Eve)
- Man of the Song (Olga)
- Brooklyn Idyll (Stella)
- Argonauts (Natasha)
- Calico Ball (Svetlana)
- Stranglehold (Jill)
- Glory (Natasha)
- Without Naming Names (Poema)
- Mr. Dead (Vukitsa)
- Comedy of Frol Skobelev (Barbara)
- Summer and Smoke (Alma's mother)
- One Calorie of Tenderness (Grandmother)
- Grandma Blues (Vera Konstantinovna)
- Der Rosenkavalier (Fraulein Blyumenblat)

== Filmography ==
- 1953: Mother or Woman (Johanna Sillankorva; Russian voice)
- 1956: Path of Thunder (Selia)
- 1978: Only... (Maria Nikolaevna)

== Awards ==
- Honored Artist of the RSFSR (2 March 1971)
- Medal of the Order of Merit for the Fatherland, 2nd class (1997)
