= Slađa Guduraš =

- Слађа Гудураш
- Born: Slađana Guduraš; 11 August 1987; Srbac, SR Bosnia and Herzegovina, SFR Yugoslavia
- Died: 10 December 2014 (aged 27); Sremska Mitrovica, Serbia
- Resting place: Town Cemetery in Srbac, Bosnia and Herzegovina
- Occupations: Nurse; singer; actress
- Years active: 2012–2014
- Musical career
- Genres: pop; dance
- Instrument: vocals

Slađana "Slađa" Guduraš (Serbian Cyrillic: Слађана "Слађа" Гудураш; 11 August 1987 – 10 December 2014) was a Bosnian recording artist, bit actress and nurse from Banja Luka. Her short-lived musical career ended when she died from drowning in a canal after a road accident at age 27 while en route to Belgrade. Her disappearance and death were featured prominently by the Bosnian and Serbian media.

== Early life ==
Guduraš was born in Banja Luka, Bosnia and Herzegovina into a Bosnian Serb family. Her mother is Jelka Pantić.

== Career ==
In her short career, Guduraš had only one single; "Silikoni i kubici" (Silicone and Volume) in 2013 featuring Serbian rapper Juice. The music video for the song premiered 22 November 2013.

She also appeared in the music videos for "Reci brate" (2012) by Saša Matić and Cvija, which premiered 1 January 2013, and "Šta da radim sad" by rappers Juice, Gru and Napoleon.

Guduraš appeared in several episodes of popular Bosnian sitcoms Lud, zbunjen, normalan and Kriza.

== Death ==
Guduraš spent most of 10 December 2014 at her boutique Leopard in Bijeljina and left for Belgrade at about 6 PM. On 11 December at about 11 PM, her new boyfriend Zoran Makivić reported her missing after finding it strange that she wasn't answering her phone and hadn't been on Facebook in over a day. Initially it was assumed that her abusive ex-boyfriend Dragan Perić from Bijeljina had something to do with her disappearance. Perić reportedly threatened Guduraš by saying she "would end up like Ksenija Pajčin," a singer who had been murdered by her ex-boyfriend in 2010, and that he would commit suicide. They had been in a relationship from 2013 until November 2014, when Guduraš walked in on Perić kissing male hair stylist Aleksandar Kapriš. Another incident occurred the week before she went missing when Perić attacked her at the hotel Hollywood in Sarajevo.

On 16 December 2014, a crashed Volkswagen Golf with Bosnian license plates was found in a canal in Sremska Mitrovica. Guduraš's body was found inside and it is believed that she swerved off the road on 10 December 2014 and crashed into the canal. The car was not seen for six days due to the area being densely overgrown with shrubbery. The autopsy results released 19 December 2014 confirmed that the body found in the car was that of Guduraš. Her death made her a new member of the 27 Club.

In the days following her death several of her friends said they believe she "foresaw" her own death. Singer Miki Mećava, who had done a talk show with her on 3 December and slept over at the same hotel in Sarajevo, said that she was afraid of being murdered. She would not leave the hotel to go to restaurants with a group of friends because she was afraid that someone would murder her. Not long before her death, she relocated to Belgrade and had her own apartment there.

Guduraš was buried in the town cemetery in Srbac, Bosnia and Herzegovina on 20 December 2014. She was not married and had no children.
