= Lawrence A. Roberts =

American politician

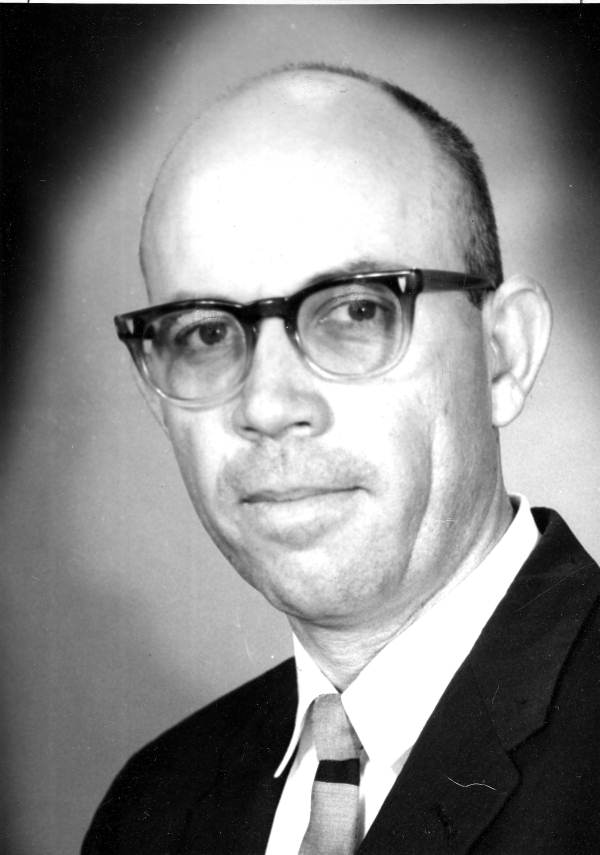
- Roberts in 1966

Member of the Florida House of Representatives from Hardee County
- In office 1965–1966

Personal details
- Born: October 18, 1928 Wauchula, Florida, U.S.
- Died: December 15, 2014 (aged 86)
- Party: Democratic
- Education: Stetson University

Lawrence A. Roberts (October 18, 1928 – December 15, 2014) was an American politician. He served as a Democratic member of the Florida House of Representatives.

== Life and career ==
Roberts was born in Wauchula, Florida. He attended Stetson University.

Roberts was a businessman and civic leader.

Roberts served in the Florida House of Representatives from 1965 to 1966.

Roberts died on December 15, 2014, at the age of 86.
