= Jeff Guy =

South African historian

Jefferson John Guy (13 June 1940 – 15 December 2014), known and published as Jeff Guy, was a well known and published academic historian whose main interest was the history of Natal and the Zulu people.

== Early life ==
Guy attended school in Pietermaritzburg, for a few years after completing his schooling he worked on farms in Britain and the then Rhodesia, and was briefly in the military as a sailor and soldier. In 1963 he registered for a degree in English at the University of Natal, but switched courses to History under the influence of Colin Webb. After graduating with an Honours degree in history he travelled to the U.K. and began a Ph.D. degree in history with Shula Marks as his supervisor. His Ph.D. thesis was later published as The Destruction of the Zulu Kingdom: The Civil War in Zululand, 1879-1884

== Career ==
After graduating with the Ph.D. degree, Guy taught for a while in London, but later moved to Lesotho where he lectured history at the Roma campus of what was then the University of Botswana, Lesotho and Swaziland. He left Lesotho for a position as a history lecturer at the University of Trondheim in Norway. In 1992 he returned to South Africa and became head of the history department at the Durban campus of the University of Natal.

== Personal life ==
While studying for his doctoral degree in London he met and married Naimi Haque. His two children with Naimi, Heli and Joe were raised in Lesotho. Guy died at Heathrow Airport while travelling back home to South Africa after attending a conference and giving a lecture marking the bicentenary of the birth of John Colenso, the first bishop of Natal.

== Published works ==
- Production and Exchange in the Zulu Kingdom. 1978.
- The Destruction of the Zulu Kingdom: The Civil War in Zululand, 1879-1884. Longman. 1979. ISBN 978-0-582-64686-5.
- The Anglo-Zulu War of 1879: Two Centenary Lectures. Friends of the Library, University of the Witwatersrand. 1979b. ISBN 978-0-85494-548-1. with Richard L. Cope
- The Heretic: A Study of the Life of John William Colenso, 1814-1883. Study of the Life of John William Colenso, 1814-1883. Ravan Press. 1983. ISBN 978-0-86975-168-8.
- Gender Oppression in Southern Africa's Pre-capitalist Societies. Workshop on Regionalism and Restructuring in Natal. University of Natal, Department of African Studies, Local Government Project. 1988.
- Creating History: An Introduction to Historical Studies : a Resource Book. 1996.
- "Battling with Banality". Journal of Natal and Zulu History. 18 (1). Informa UK Limited: 156–193. 1998. doi:10.1080/02590123.1998.11964105. ISSN 0259-0123.
- The View Across the River: Harriette Colenso and the Zulu Struggle Against Imperialism. Reconsiderations in southern African history. University Press of Virginia. 2002. ISBN 978-0-86486-373-7.
- "Somewhere over the rainbow: the nationstate, democracy and race in a globalising South Africa". Transformation: Critical Perspectives on Southern Africa. 56 (1). Project Muse: 68–89. 2004. doi:10.1353/trn.2005.0018. ISSN 1726-1368. S2CID 154111939.
- The Maphumulo Uprising: War, Law and Ritual in the Zulu Rebellion. University of KwaZulu-Natal Press. 2005. ISBN 978-1-86914-048-9.
- Remembering the Rebellion: The Zulu Uprising of 1906. University of KwaZulu-Natal Press. 2006. ISBN 978-1-86914-117-2.
- Theophilus Shepstone and the Forging of Natal: African Autonomy and Settler Colonialism in the Making of Traditional Authority. University of KwaZulu-Natal Press. 2013. ISBN 978-1-86914-249-0.
