= Mayer Eisenstein =

American physician and businessman (1946 – 2014)

- Born: January 26, 1946
- Died: December 22, 2014 (aged 68)
- Education: John Marshall Law School
- Occupations: Physician, pediatrician

Mayer Eisenstein (January 26, 1946 – December 22, 2014) was an American pediatrician and family physician known for his opposition to vaccines. He was also known for promoting the use of Lupron as a treatment for autism, a practice originally developed by Mark Geier which has been heavily criticized. He founded and ran the Homefirst practice in suburban Chicago in 1973, and ran it until he died in 2014. Homefirst was known for providing physician-attended home births. In the 1990s, he attended John Marshall Law School along with his son, Jeremy.
