= Emma Ruíz =

Mexican fencer

Personal information
- Born: 26 January 1922 Santa María Jalapa del Marqués, Mexico
- Died: 9 December 2014 (aged 92)

Sport
- Sport: Fencing

Emma Ruíz (26 January 1922 – 9 December 2014) was a Mexican fencer. She competed in the women's individual foil event at the 1948 Summer Olympics.
