= James Brown (cricketer) =

Scottish cricketer

Cricket information
- Batting: Right-handed

Career statistics
Competition	First-class
Matches	59
Runs scored	1,306
Batting average	19.49
100s/50s	0/4
Top score	90
Catches/stumpings	83/22
- Source: CricketArchive

James "Jimmy" Brown MBE (24 September 1931 – 8 December 2014) was a Scottish first-class cricketer. He played as a wicket-keeper and took a record 119 catches and 40 stumpings for them. In first-class cricket his tally of 105 dismissals is easily the most by a cricketer for Scotland.

In club cricket for Perthshire and took 674 dismissals. He was awarded the MBE in the 1974 New Year Honours.

He died on 8 December 2014 at the age of 83.
