= Ronald Bromley =

British Army officer

Ronald Bromley

Ronald Arthur Bromley MC (13 June 1918 – 30 December 2014) was a British Army officer of the 9th Survey Regiment RA (9 SR) who was awarded the Military Cross for his actions in Holland in November 1944 when he reconnoitered a minefield at great personal risk and saved many lives.

During D-Day he used sound ranging equipment to identify the positions of enemy guns and carried out similar work in Calais in August 1944.

After the war, Bromley returned to local government and retired in 1979 as the engineer and surveyor of Elmbridge Council.
