= Jack Harrington (Australian footballer) =

Australian rules footballer

Personal information
- Full name: Jack Harrington
- Born: 26 June 1930
- Died: 11 December 2014 (aged 84)
- Original team: Colac
- Height: 183 cm (6 ft 0 in)
- Weight: 87 kg (192 lb)

Playing career^{1}
Years	Club	Games (Goals)
1953–57	Essendon	64 (12)
- ^{1} Playing statistics correct to the end of 1957.

Jack Harrington (26 June 1930 – 11 December 2014) was an Australian rules footballer who played with Essendon in the Victorian Football League (VFL). An eye injury ended his VFL career at the age of 27.
