= John M. Imel =

American lawyer (1932–2014)

United States Attorney for the Northern District of Oklahoma
- In office 1961–1967
- President: John F. Kennedy; Lyndon B. Johnson
- Preceded by: Robert S. Rizley
- Succeeded by: Lawrence A. McSoud

Personal details
- Born: August 4, 1932 Cushing, Oklahoma, U.S.
- Died: December 25, 2014 (aged 82) Tulsa, Oklahoma, U.S.
- Party: Democratic

John M. Imel (August 4, 1932 – December 25, 2014) was an American attorney who served as the United States Attorney for the Northern District of Oklahoma from 1961 to 1967.

He died in Tulsa, Oklahoma at age 82.
