= Ray Williams (rugby union coach) =

Welsh rugby union footballer & coach

- Born: Raymond Williams; 25 August 1927 Wrexham, Wales
- Died: 3 December 2014 (aged 87) Haverfordwest, Pembrokeshire, Wales

Rugby union career
- Position: Fly-half
Amateur team(s)
Years	Team	Apps	(Points)
1940s–50s	London Welsh		
1940s–50s	Northampton		

Ray Williams, OBE (25 August 1927 – 3 December 2014) was the world's first professional full-time rugby union coach. He was the national coaching director of the Welsh Rugby Union (WRU) in the late 1960s and through the 1970s, devising the strategies that led Wales to dominate rugby in Europe at that time. He was also a major influence on former Australian national coach Bob Templeton.

A talented player in his younger years, Williams played for London Welsh, Northampton, Moseley, and East Midlands. He was selected to trial for the Welsh national team as a flyhalf. Williams trained as a PE teacher at Loughborough College and coached the West Midland's region in England. He also staged courses to help teachers become rugby coaches and was the driving force behind the creation of England rugby's coaching manual in the early 1950s. Williams was appointed to the WRU in 1967, and began a transformation of Welsh rugby through conferences and courses which gave Wales more than 300 qualified coaches by the mid-1970s.

He became an administrator with the WRU in the 1980s and 90s. Williams was Tournament Director of the Rugby World Cup in Wales in 1991. He received an OBE for services to rugby in 1995. Williams was awarded the International Rugby Board’s Vernon Pugh award for distinguished service in 2014, just weeks before his death after a battle with cancer.
