= Alex Chigogidze =

Georgian mathematician (1955-2014)

Dr. Alex Chigogidze
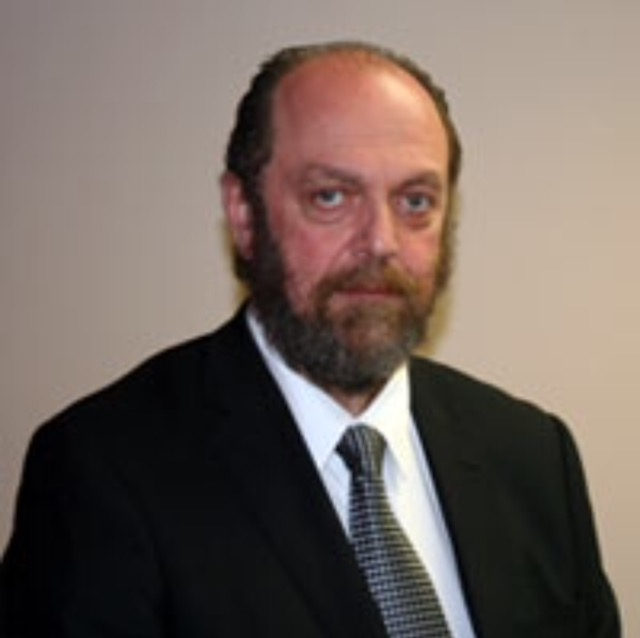
- Born: Tbilisi, Georgia
- Died: December 15, 2014
- Resting place: Tbilisi, Georgia
- Citizenship: United States, Canada
- Education: PhD. Tbilisi State University, DSc. Moscow State University
- Occupations: Mathematician, Dean of Science & Technology
- Notable work: Inverse Spectra

Alexander Chigogidze (Georgian: ალექსანდრე ჩიგოგიძე; 1 January 1955 – 14 December 2014) was a Georgian-born general topologist. Chigogidze is best known for his book Inverse Spectra, in which he passed on to the next generation of topologists the results of the Fedorchuk -Schepin Topology seminars held at the Moscow State University during the 1980s. The book also contains important contributions Chigogidze made in the area of General Topology and Geometric Topology (of Bing-Borsuk type). In the area of General Topology, Chigogidze developed extension theory for noncompact nonmetrizable spaces. In the area of Geometric Topology, Chigogidze introduced grading to shape theory by developing a theory n-Shape where n is an arbitrary integer. This was a major addendum to the existing n-Homotopy theory.

After graduating from Tbilisi State University, he became a research associate at Moscow University, moved on to become an associate professor and full professor at the University of Saskatchewan (Canada), and at the University of North Carolina at Greensboro where he was the H.Barton Excellence Professor and served as Head of the Mathematics Department. He served as the Dean of Science & Technology at the City University of New York, College of Staten Island.

Throughout his mathematical career, he published over 100 papers and two books.

== Life ==
Alexander Chigogidze was born in Tbilisi, Georgia on January 1, 1955, to Tchola Chigogidze (a doctor) and Rusudan Chinchaladze (a music teacher). He died on December 15, 2014.

== Academic career ==
Alex Chigogidze was a senior research associate at the Georgian Academy of Sciences and then an associate professor at Petrozavdsk State University, Russia. After graduating from Tbilisi State University, he became a research associate at Moscow State University where he received the esteemed Doctor of Science degree. He moved on to become an Associate and Full professor at the University of Saskatchewan (Canada).

=== Moving to the U.S. ===
In 2003, Chigogidze was offered the opportunity to be head of the Mathematical Sciences Department at the University of North Carolina at Greensboro (UNCG). There he was named an H. Barton Excellence Professor. While at UNCG, Dr. Chigogidze completely redesigned the undergraduate and graduate programs. He single handedly advanced and implemented numerous courses, and acted not only as a professor and educator, but also as a top administrator of the Mathematics Department. These accomplishments garnered the attention the UNC Administration, and placed him as a prominent leader in mathematics education. The caliber of his achievements dramatically altered the potential and performance of the University of North Carolina's mathematical department and its research.

He served as the Dean of Science & Technology at the City University of New York, College of Staten Island.

== Publications ==
Chigogidze’s research interests were mainly related to topology, functional analysis, operator algebras and metric geometry.

Throughout his mathematical career, he published over 100 papers, as well as being referenced in the Encyclopedia of General Topology By K.P. Hart, Jun-iti Nagata, J.E. Vaugha.

Some of his research and publications include:

"Inductive Dimensions of Completely Regular Spaces", Tbilisi State University, 1977.

"On Bicompact Extensions of Tychonoff Spaces", Tbilisi, Georgia, January 1978.

"On a Generalization of Perfectly Normal Spaces, Topology and its Applications, 1982.

"Noncompact Absolute Extensors in Dimension n, n-soft Mappings, and their Applications", 1986.

"Universal Maps and Surjective Characterizations of Completely Metrizable LCn-Spaces", A. Chigogidze and V. Valov Proceedings of the American Mathematical Society, August 1990.

"UVn-equivalence and n-equivalence", Topology and its Applications, June 1992.

"Shape Properties of Nonmetrizable Spaces", Topology and its Applications, December 1993.

"Set-valued Maps and AE(0)-spaces", Topology and its Applications, January 1994.

"Cohomological Dimension of Tychonov Spaces", Topology and its Applications, September 1997.

"Fixed Point Sets of Autohomeomorphisms of Uncountable Products", A. Chigogidze, J.R. Martin Topology and its Applications, October 1997.

"Compactifications and Universal Spaces in Extension Theory', Proceedings of the American Mathematical Society, October 1999.

"Complemented Subspaces of Products of Banach spaces", Cornell University Library, February 2000.

"Notes on Two Conjectures in Extension Theory", November 2002.

"Extraordinary Dimension Theories Generated by Complexes", Cornell University Library, January 2003.

"Nonmetrizable ANR's Admitting a Group Structure are Manifolds", Cornell University Library, February 2005.

"On C*-algebras with the Approximate n-th Root Property", A. Chigogidze, A. Karasev, K. Kawamura and V. Valov, Australian Mathematical Society, March 2005.

"Valdivia Compact Groups are Products", February 2008.

"Local Sections of Serre Fibrations with 3-Manifold Fibers", N. Brodskiya, A. Chigogidze, E.V. Shchepinc, March 2010.

"Which Compacta are Noncommutative ARs?" Special issue on the occasion of the 25th Anniversary of the Chair of General Topology and Geometry at Moscow State University, March 2010.

== Author ==
In 1996, his book "Inverse Spectra", was published. A powerful method used in many areas of topology, the notion of an inverse spectra was originally introduced by Lefschetz.

Dr. Chigogidze was on the editorial board of the JP Journal of Geometry and Topology, and also on the Tbilisi Mathematical Journal.

== Death ==
Chigogidze died in New York City on 15 December 2014.
