= James L. Kinsey =

James L. Kinsey (October 15, 1934, in Paris, Texas – December 20, 2014, in Houston, Texas) was an American chemist, and D. R. Bullard-Welch Foundation Professor at Rice University. He won the 1995 Earle K. Plyler Prize for Molecular Spectroscopy. He was a 1969 Guggenheim Fellow. He was a Fellow of the American Academy of Arts and Sciences.

== Life ==
He graduated from Rice University, with a B.A. in 1956 and PhD in 1959. He studied the University of Upsala, and the University of California, Berkeley. He taught at the Massachusetts Institute of Technology from 1962 to 1988.
