= Craig Schiffer =

American financial CEO and founder

- Born: August 25, 1956; Ohio, United States
- Died: December 23, 2014 (aged 58); Grenoble, France
- Education: University of California, Santa Cruz
- Employer: Sevara Partners LLC
- Title: Partner

Craig Schiffer (August 25, 1956 – December 23, 2014) was the former chief executive officer of the Americas of Dresdner Kleinwort, based in New York, from 2003 to 2006. (In September 2009, after Dresdner Kleinwort was merged into Commerzbank, Commerzbank decided to abandon use of the Dresdner Kleinwort name, although pending legal actions resulting from disputed bonus payments continue to keep the bank in the spotlight.) In February 2009, Schiffer founded Sevara Partners LLC, a boutique financial advisory firm based in New York City which serves clients in the United States and Europe.

== Career ==
Schiffer joined Dresdner Kleinwort in London in 2001 as a managing director and executive committee member in the Global Debt business. Shortly after, he moved to the New York office to be Head of Capital Markets, North America, becoming Chief Executive in early 2003. Under his tenure, he successfully restructured the New York and Latin American businesses from a U.S. $300 million loss in 2002 to a net operating profit of almost U.S. $300 million (on a U.S. $600 million revenue base in 2006). Craig Schiffer oversaw both the continuing businesses at Dresdner Kleinwort and the Institutional Restructuring Unit, Dresdner's $9 billion “bad bank” in North America.

Prior to Dresdner Kleinwort, Schiffer headed Nomura International’s European Fixed Income Division, overseeing all of the capital markets and derivative businesses. At Nomura, he led the business to bottom line profitability for the first time ever in fiscal year 1999–2000. Schiffer joined Nomura in August 1997 where he was originally responsible for restructuring Nomura's U.S. derivatives business, implementing robust risk management and achieving operating profitability. He then took on additional responsibility for Nomura's proprietary businesses in Europe, which grew considerably under his tenure. He was a member of the European Management Board at Nomura International, responsible for strategy and the daily operations of the European businesses.

Prior to Nomura, Schiffer spent eighteen and a half years at Lehman Brothers. He served in a variety of management roles in both Fixed Income and Equities. As the Global Head of Equity Derivatives, Schiffer oversaw operations and concentrated on building the business, and before that, Schiffer was the Global Head of Fixed Income Derivatives (1992–1994), where he restructured and took the fixed income derivatives business from a marginal revenue producer and transformed it into one of the most profitable businesses at Lehman Brothers.

== Death ==
Schiffer was killed in an avalanche while skiing in Grenoble, France, on December 23, 2014.
