= Mohammad Shahid (Indian cricketer) =

Indian cricketer (1948–2014)

Personal information
- Born: 11 November 1948; Aligarh, India
- Died: 12 December 2014 (aged 66); Aligarh, India
- Source: ESPNcricinfo, 30 March 2016

Mohammad Shahid (11 November 1948 – 12 December 2014) was an Indian cricketer. He played in 64 first-class cricket matches for Railways and Uttar Pradesh.
