= Lila Sapinsley =

American politician

Lila Manfield Sapinsley (September 9, 1922 – December 9, 2014) was an American politician.

Born in Chicago, Illinois, Sapinsley received her degree in psychology from Wellesley College in 1944. Sapinsley was originally a Democrat. However, in 1964 she created "Democrats for Chafee", an advocacy group for the gubernatorial campaign of Republican John Chafee. After Chafee's victory as governor, she was appointed to the Rhode Island Board of Trustees of State Colleges and eventually became its chair. In 1972 she ran for Rhode Island Senate as an Independent and won. Later on, she joined the Republican Party and soon became the first female minority leader of the senate. In the Senate, she worked on women's issues, including opposing strict restrictions on abortion and fighting for the equal treatment for women in obtaining credit. She also sponsored government transparency and ethics legislation.

In 1984, Sapinsley unsuccessfully ran for lieutenant governor, and soon became chairwoman of the Rhode Island Housing and Mortgage Finance Corporation (RIHMFC) a year later. After two years of working to improve the RIHMFC's reputation, she became the commissioner of the Public Utilities Commission, a title she held until her retirement in 1993. Even in retirement, Sapinsley served as a volunteer for the Providence Public Library; for Dorcas Place, a parent literacy center; as a co-chair of Senator John Chafee's campaign for re-election; and as president of the Wellesley College class of 1944.

Sapinsley has served on the board of trustees for the American Civil Liberties Union, Butler Hospital, the Mental Health Association of Rhode Island, Planned Parenthood of Rhode Island, Temple Beth El and the Wellesley Center for Research on Women. Her awards include honorary degrees from the University of Rhode Island, Rhode Island College, and Brown University; she also was given the Legislator of the Year award by the National Conference of Republican Legislators and was the two-time Woman of the Year, according to the Governor's commission on Women. She is an inductee to the Rhode Island Heritage Hall of Fame. Sapinsley died at home in Providence, Rhode Island in December 2014. She was Jewish.
