= Clarence Noland =

American politician

Member of the Kentucky House of Representatives from the 84th district
- In office January 1, 1982 – January 1, 1997
- Preceded by: Lloyd McKinney
- Succeeded by: Scott Alexander (redistricting)

Personal details
- Born: June 11, 1937
- Died: December 15, 2014 (aged 77)
- Party: Republican

Clarence D. Noland Jr. (June 11, 1937 – December 15, 2014) was an American politician from Kentucky who was a member of the Kentucky House of Representatives from 1982 to 1997. Noland was first elected in 1981, defeating incumbent Republican representative Lloyd McKinney for renomination. In 1996 he was redistricted to the 36th district and lost the Republican primary to Lonnie Napier.

He died in December 2014 at age 77.
