= Fred Meggs =

- Born: Alfred Leslie Meggs III; April 18, 1952; Oakland, California, U.S.
- Died: December 11, 2014 (aged 62); Sacramento, California, U.S.
- Occupation: Music composer
- Known for: Worked on Sell This House and other documentaries, movies, and television shows

Alfred "Fred" Leslie Meggs III (April 18, 1952 – December 11, 2014) was an American composer. He composed and aired over 7,000 pieces of music on radio and television. He has written the music for movies and documentaries including First Landing (2006), From a Silk Cocoon (2004), and The Bill Collector (2010).

Starting in 2003, Fred Meggs began to work on the television series Sell This House, which has lasted for seven years. He has also composed the music for several television shows on the Discovery Channel and A&E.
