= David R. Chesnutt =

American historian and editor

David Rogers Chesnutt
- Born: 1940; Athens, Alabama, United States
- Died: December 15, 2014 (aged 73–74); Hardwick, Vermont, United States
- Known for: The Papers of Henry Laurens
- Spouse: Elizabeth H. Dow

Academic background
- Education: University of Alabama, Auburn University, University of Georgia

David Rogers Chesnutt (1940 – December 15, 2014) was an American historian and editor.

== Life ==
Chesnutt was born in Athens, Alabama, and earned academic degrees at University of Alabama (1962), Auburn University (1967) and the University of Georgia (1973).

Chesnutt was in the History Department at the University of South Carolina for 35 years as Research Professor. His major work was The Papers of Henry Laurens, serving as associate editor and then editor. As part of that project he was influential in moving the scholarly editing project to digital technologies, which was ground-breaking at the time.

For more than two decades, Chesnutt served on the South Carolina Historical Records Advisory Board. He was an important figure in the foundation and early development of the Text Encoding Initiative and active in the Association for Computers and the Humanities.

In 2005 Chesnutt was awarded the Order of the Palmetto, South Carolina's "highest civilian honor for extraordinary lifetime achievement and service to the state and nation".

Chesnutt died in Hardwick, Vermont, on December 15, 2014, of throat cancer.

== Awards ==
- The Distinguished Service Award (with Charles Cullen (editor)) from the Association for Documentary Editing, 1985.
- The Lyman H. Butterfield Award from the Association for Documentary Editing, 1990,
- The Julian P. Boyd Award from the Association for Documentary Editing, 1995.
- The Order of the Palmetto from the Governor of South Carolina 2005.

== Selected works ==
- The Papers of Henry Laurens, 16 volumes, University of South Carolina Press, 1968

volumes 5–10 edited by George C. Rogers and Chesnutt; volumes 11–16 edited by Chesnutt and C. James Taylor; LCCN 67-29381

- South Carolina's Expansion into Colonial Georgia, 1720–1765, New York: Garland Pub., 1989, LCCN 89-7774
