= Mark Lewis (storyteller) =

American storyteller, actor, and teacher (1954–2014)

Mark W. Lewis
- Born: February 16, 1954
- Died: December 7, 2014 (aged 60); Eugene, Oregon
- Occupations: storyteller, short story writer, actor
- Writing career
- Subject: Fiction
- Website: www.markwlewisstoryteller.com

Mark Lewis (February 16, 1954 – December 7, 2014) was an American storyteller, actor, and teacher.

He began his storytelling career while a student at John Muir High School in Pasadena, California, winning regional drama competitions with his telling of "How the Grinch Stole Christmas" and "Jabberwocky", two pieces that became staples of his professional storytelling repertory. In 1971, he formed a performing partnership with singer-songwriter-actor Craig Coulter, and together, as Coulter & Lewis, they developed an enthusiastic local following performing songs (some original), poetry, children's stories, and skits. This was the beginning of Lewis's professional career. Among their earliest engagements were regular appearances at the comedy club "The Ice House" in Pasadena. In the early 1980s, in the final seasons of the Coulter & Lewis partnership, the duo performed shows at the Smothers Theater at Pepperdine University and was engaged by the Los Angeles Music Center to perform in Los Angeles area schools with the "Music Center on Tour" program.

Lewis was part of the Renaissance Pleasure Faires that took place in Agoura, California in the 1970s - 1990s, serving first as the black-hooded and silent Executioner. He later took on speaking roles that allowed him to share his storytelling gifts with Faire-goers. Lewis received two Emmy Awards for his show "Word Pictures" on WTTW in Chicago, and he had a syndicated radio show. He appeared on The Tonight Show with Jay Leno and his voice can still be heard on the Pirates of the Caribbean ride in Disneyland. He was a featured performer on the TV series Northern Exposure on CBS and Leverage on TNT (as Santa/Jack in "The Ho Ho Ho Job", 2012). Lewis was an illustrator and he wrote four books, among them Kaliban's Christmas: A Special Tale of Magic (Puffin Books, 1987), The Secret of the Quilt (Book One of The Counterpane Collection) with illustrations by Laura Kelly (Laughing Moon Productions, 1992), and the ibook Anna and the Sun (Lulu.com, 2011). He performed in several films and commercials for national audiences and worked as a Creative Content Provider for Microsoft, Disney Imagineering, Universal Studios, and Silicon Gaming Inc. He was a real magician as a storyteller.

Lewis organized storytelling workshops, and he was a member of the faculty at Unitarian Universalist Camp de Benneville Pines Family Camp and Camp Bravo, a summer theater camp for teens, teaching storytelling and stagecraft. He was a part-time college professor of Presentation Skills in the University of Oregon School of Journalism and Communication in Eugene. He was also one of the founders of the Academy Of Arts and Academies (A3) in Springfield Oregon and longtime teacher/guest artist at the school. Also volunteered for the Oregon chapter of the International Thespian Society.

Lewis died on December 7, 2014, of medical complications after foot surgery. He left behind his wife, Colleen, and daughters Mical and Kate

== Storytelling ==
Lewis believed that everyone is a storyteller because everyone has a story to tell. He was known for his skill in the art of physical storytelling, capturing audiences in imaginary worlds with his intricate use of imagery and diction. He played many instruments (notably the recorder) and sang.

== Filmography ==
Television

Year	Title	Role	Other notes
1995	Northern Exposure	Rusty Keyes	
1997	American River Journals	Host	Won 1997 TELLY Award
	The Tonight Show with Jay Leno	Guest Performer	
2011	Grimm	Robin's Grandfather	Pilot (One Episode)
2012	Leverage	Santa Claus/Jack	"The Ho Ho Ho Job"

Film

Year	Title	Role	Other notes
2014	Nobody	George	TV movie
