= Neville Featherstone-Griffin =

English cricketer

Personal information
- Full name: Neville Featherstone-Griffin
- Born: 17 December 1933; Croydon, Surrey, England
- Died: 17 December 2014 (aged 81)
- Batting: Right-handed
- Bowling: Right-arm medium

Domestic team information
- Years: Team
- 1963: Surrey

Career statistics
Competition	First-class
Matches	1
Runs scored	90
Batting average	90.00
100s/50s	–/1
Top score	83*
Balls bowled	90
Wickets	–
Bowling average	–
5 wickets in innings	–
10 wickets in match	–
Best bowling	–
Catches/stumpings	–/–
- Source: Cricinfo, 23 February 2013

Neville Featherstone-Griffin (17 December 1933 – 17 December 2014) was an English cricketer. Griffin was a right-handed batsman who bowled right-arm medium pace. He was born in Croydon, Surrey.

Featherstone-Griffin made a single first-class appearance for Surrey against Oxford University in 1963 at The Oval. Oxford University won the toss and elected to bat first, making 264 all out in their first-innings, during which Griffin bowled nine wicketless overs which conceded 34 runs. In Surrey's first-innings of 250/8 declared, Griffin was dismissed for 7 runs by John Cuthbertson. Oxford University then made 249/5 declared, with Griffin bowling a further seven wicketless overs which conceded 11 runs. Set 264 for victory, Surrey fell eight runs short in their chase ensuring the match ended in a draw. Griffin ended the innings not out on 83. This was his only major appearance for Surrey.

He died on 17 December 2014 on his 81st birthday.
