= Peter Delisle =

English cricketer

Personal information
- Full name: Gustave Peter Sapenne Delisle
- Born: 25 December 1934; Basseterre, St Kitts
- Died: 12 December 2014 (aged 79); Sunningdale, Berkshire, England
- Batting: Right-handed

Domestic team information
- Years: Team
- 1954–1956: Oxford University
- 1954–1957: Middlesex

Career statistics
Competition	First-class
Matches	91
Runs scored	3,283
Batting average	22.33
100s/50s	3/16
Top score	130
Catches/stumpings	40/–
- Source: Cricinfo, 7 October 2025

Gustave Peter Sapenne Delisle (25 December 1934 – 12 December 2014) was an English cricketer. He played first-class cricket for Middlesex and Oxford University between 1954 and 1957.

Delisle was educated at Stonyhurst College and Lincoln College, Oxford. He retired from cricket at the end of the 1957 season and joined the Rifle Brigade. He then worked in finance in the City of London until severe injuries from a road accident forced his early retirement in 1986. He took up a position at Sunningdale School in 1988.
