= Nikolai Vasenin =

Nikolai Vasenin (5 December 1919 – 7 December 2014) was a Soviet World War II veteran who fought in the French Resistance during the early 1940s. In 1941, Germany invaded the Soviet Union and captured Vasenin and so they sent him to become a prisoner owned by the French. The French gave him an opportunity to fight among them and so he took the offer. By 1945, Vasenin achieved the rank of Commander in his French Resistance unit and returned to his home country only to be jailed under the orders of Russia's leader Joseph Stalin for the next 15 years.

== Death ==
Vasenin died in Berezovsky on 7 December 2014, after being hospitalized since 1 December. He had turned 95 on 5 December.
