= Nand Chaturvedi =

Hindi writer and poet

- Born: 21 April 1923; Jhalawar, Rajasthan, British India
- Died: 25 December 2014 (aged 91); Udaipur, Rajasthan, India
- Occupations: poet, literateur, socialist

Nand Chaturvedi (1923–2014) was a socialist, a well-known Hindi poet and a littérateur.

== Education and works ==
Born in a Brahmin family, Nand Chaturvedi had a Master of Arts degree in Hindi from Rajasthan University. He was editor of the quarterly journal Bindu from 1966 to 1972.

Apart from teaching, he used to write poems. A few of his popular works are:
* Yeh Samai Mamuli Nahin, "these are not ordinary times", in 1983.
* Shabd Sansar ki Yayavari, collection of essays, in 1985.
* Imandar Dunya Ke Liye, "for honest world", in 1994.
* Woh Soye To Nahin Honge, in 1997.
* Utsav Ka Nirmam Samai, "crucial times of this festival".

== Awards ==
- He was a recipient of Bihari Puraskar of KK Birla Foundation in 1996 for Yeh Samai mamuli nahin.
- Prasar Bharati honoured him with the Prasaran Sanmaan in 1998.
- He was a recipient of Equality Writer Award by Astha Sansthan in January 2007.
- He was chosen for year 2008's Sahitya Vachaspati, the top literary honour of the Prayag Hindi Sahitya Sammelan. It was conferred to him at Jaipur in March 2008.
- He was honoured with Mira Puraskar, the highest literary honour of the Rajasthan Government.
- He was also conferred with Lok Mangal Puraskar of Mumbai.

== Personal life ==
He died on 25 December 2014; he was survived by four sons and two daughters.
