= Timothy Dowd =

Timothy Joseph Dowd (1915–2014) was the deputy chief of New York City Police Department (1940–1978) who led the manhunt to capture David Berkowitz.

== Biography ==
He was born in County Kerry, Ireland on May 30, 1915, to Timothy Dowd and Margaret O’Sullivan. He died on December 27, 2014, in Millbrook, New York. He survived by four children; 11 grandchildren and two great-grandchildren.
