= Přemek Podlaha =

- Born: June 13, 1938. Prague, Czech Republic
- Died: December 23, 2014 (aged 76); Czech Republic
- Occupation(s): Czech moderator and publicist

Přemek Podlaha (June 13, 1938 − December 23, 2014) was a television personality from the Czech Republic.

For almost three decades he hosted a TV and radio magazine show about gardening and lifestyle.

In 1962, Podlaha studied journalism at the Faculty of Arts of Charles University. But he began to form a relationship with the garden soon after his studies, when he started publishing the Agricultural Magazine on the then Czechoslovak television.

In addition he published journals, wrote several books, recorded a few songs with lyrics about gardening and appeared often in advertisements.
