= Joan Israel =

American psychotherapist and feminist

Joan Israel (1930 – December 30, 2014) was an American psychotherapist and feminist. She was a founder and president of the Michigan chapter of the National Organization for Women (NOW) and chair of the child care committee.

== Early life ==
Israel was born in 1930. She received a bachelors' of arts degree from the University of Rochester in 1952 and a master's degree in social work from Smith College in 1954. Her masters focused on childcare plans for women suffering from psychosis who were hospitalized. She married Kenneth Israel, a psychiatrist, and the couple had three children.

== Career ==
Israel began working for the Jewish Family and Children's Service in Detroit, Michigan, between 1954 and 1957 before working as the director of Operation Friendship from 1960 to 1968, which was funded by the National Council of Jewish Women. Between 1968 and 1970, she worked as the director of the undergraduate practicum program at the Merrill-Palmer Institute. She was coordinator of special projects for the Jewish Family and Children's Service from 1970 to 1974. She founded New Options, Inc., a consultancy focused on affirmative action, and served as director from 1974 to 1976. She also worked in private practice as a psychotherapist who was accredited by the Academy of Certified Social Workers (ACSW).

== Activism ==
She was a founding member of the Detroit chapter of the National Organization for Women (NOW). While serving as the first vice president of Michigan's chapter, Israel organized and chaired the child care committee for the national organization between 1968 and 1970, when she was appointed by the Detroit Common Council to lead its new committee focusing on local child care needs. The report created by this committee led to the formation of the Wayne County Child Care Council, the first body to include both the city and county in planning for child care. Israel planned multiple child care conferences through her position with NOW, as well as researching and distributing a brochure on the topic and presenting the issue to newspapers. She surveyed companies on child care needs, visited centers in Europe and discussed universal child care with companies including Blue Cross Blue Shield. She also drafted and successfully helped to pass legislation to improve child care in Michigan. Following her resignation from the NOW committee, the organization lost its interest in the topic.

Israel served two terms as president of the Michigan chapter of NOW, succeeding Patricia Hill Burnett, between 1970 and 1974. During this time, she challenged the licences of a number of local television stations. She developed a three-day conference focused on aging which was presented in 1973 and she led a series of workshops on menopause at a time when it was rarely discussed. She was honored in 1974 with the Feminist of the Year Award from the Michigan chapter of NOW on Women's Equality Day. She also served as a member of the national board between 1976 and 1977 and chaired workshops for the national conference held in April 1977 in Detroit.

She was a member of the women's advisory committee for the Detroit Human Relations Commission between 1970 and 1973, when she was approached to lead the women's advisory committee for WXYZ-TV. She was the author of Surviving the Change: A Practical Guide to Menopause which was published in 1980 by Cinnibar Publications and the co-editor of Looking Ahead: A Woman's Guide to the Problems and Joys of Growing Older which was published in 1977 by Prentice Hall. She produced the short films 'Women Alone', about a Black single mother on Aid to Families with Dependent Children, and 'To Life', about three people coming to terms with aging.
