= Ju-no-kata =

Judo form/technique

Jū no Kata
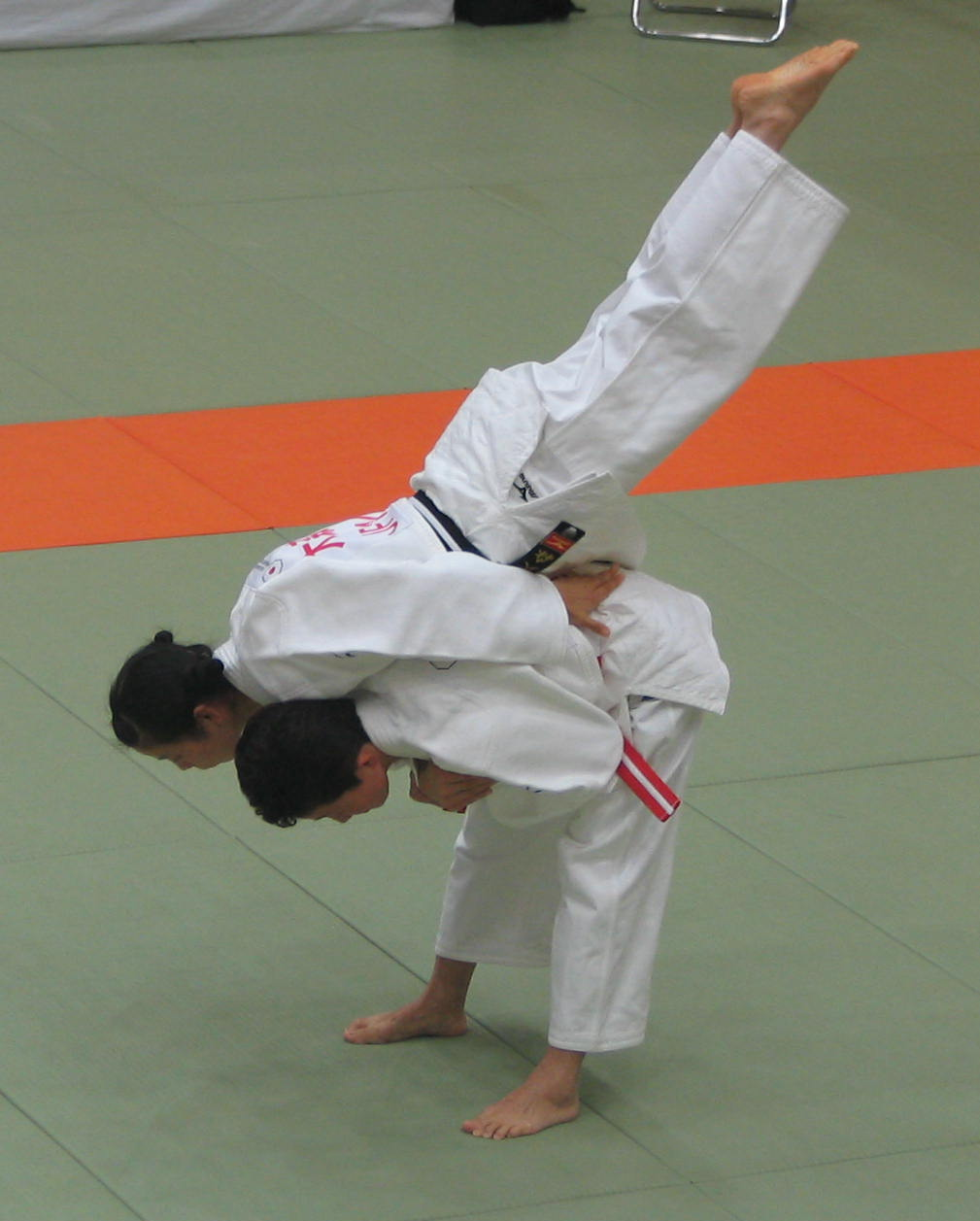
- Jū no kata performed in Judo competition.
- Classification: Kata
- Sub classification: Kodokan kata
- Kodokan: Yes

Technique name
- Rōmaji: Jū-no-kata
- Japanese: 柔の形
- English: Forms of gentleness

Ju no Kata (Japanese: 柔の形, Hepburn: Jū-no-kata, "forms of gentleness") is a kata (a set of prearranged forms) in Judo. It is designed to teach the fundamental principles of judo, especially the principle of ju (yielding or gentleness). It consists in three sets of techniques and is performed by a pair of people one acting as an Uke and the other a Tori. The kata can be performed without wearing a judogi and, as it doesn't involve the completion of any throws, does not need to be performed in a dojo.

== History ==
Ju-no-Kata was created by Jigoro Kano around 1887 when the number of people studying Judo had increased to the point where he could no longer advise everyone personally during free practice (randori).

== Techniques ==
- First Set
  - Tsuki-dashi (Hand Thrust)
  - Kata-oshi (Shoulder Push)
  - Ryo-te-dori (Two-Hand Hold)
  - Kata-mawashi (Shoulder Turn)
  - Ago-oshi (Jaw Push)
- Second Set
  - Kiri-oroshi (Downward Cut)
  - Ryo-kata-oshi (Two-Shoulder Push)
  - Naname-uchi (Slanting Strike)
  - Kata-te-dori (One-Hand Hold)
  - Kata-te-age (One-Hand Lift)
- Third Set
  - Obi-tori (Belt Grab)
  - Mune-oshi (Chest Push)
  - Tsuki-age (Uppercut)
  - Uchi-oroshi (Downward Strike)
  - Ryo-gan-tsuki (Strike to Both Eyes)
