= Natalie Carter Barraga =

American teacher (1915–2014)

Natalie Carter Barraga (October 10, 1915 – December 29, 2014) was an American educator and researcher who studied visual impairment, recognized for contributions to the education of children with low vision.

== Early life ==
Barraga was born on October 10, 1915, in Troy, Texas. In college she initially studied home economics and child development, receiving her bachelor's in 1938 from the North Texas State Teacher's College, University of North Texas. She then earned a Master's in education from University of Texas in Austin, followed by an EdD from George Peabody College for Teachers in special education for the visually impaired. Initially teaching at public schools, she taught for two years at the New York Institute for the Blind, before eventually becoming a teacher at the Texas School for the Blind after her daughter, Karen, who was visually impaired, enrolled there. She later became a faculty member at the University of Texas Austin, teaching special education.

== Research ==
Barraga's research focused on teaching methods for children with visual impairment. Her findings brought attention to the idea that children with low vision could be trained to use their vision more efficiently, rather than avoiding utilizing their vision for fear of further vision loss. This led to widespread interest in low vision children within the blindness field, and the development of 'visual efficiency' training for those children, encouraging them to use what sight they had, using magnifying devices to increase their usable vision, and teaching them to read print in addition to (or instead of) braille. She developed a visual efficiency scale and many training resources specifically for children with low vision, and published multiple articles and books on the subject, which have been utilized in teaching visually impaired children and adolescents across the world.

She also served on the advisory board for Outlook for the Blind, a research journal focusing on visual impairment, and was the main proponent of renaming it to the Journal of Visual Impairment and Blindness. She believed that the term "visual impairment" can and should be used to refer both to those with low vision and those who are blind.

== Honors and awards ==
A partial list of awards given to Dr. Barraga include:

- Migel Medal for Outstanding Service to Blind Persons from the American Foundation for the Blind, 1994
- Distinguished Alumna Award from Peabody College, 1988
- Award for Distinguished Service to Parents and Children from the National Association of Parents of Children with Visual Impairments (NAPVI), 1986
- Ambrose M. Shotwell Memorial Award for National and International Service to Visually Impaired Persons from the Association for Education and Rehabilitation of the Blind and Visually Impaired, 1984

The Natalie Barraga Center for Studies and Research in Low Vision in São Paulo, Brazil, which opened in 1997, is named for her.

== Death ==
Barraga died on December 29, 2014, aged 99.
