= Keith Jenkinson =

Australian rules footballer (1926–2014)

Personal information
- Full name: Keith Jenkinson
- Born: 3 November 1926
- Died: 31 December 2014 (aged 88)
- Height: 173 cm (5 ft 8 in)
- Weight: 67 kg (148 lb)

Playing career^{1}
Years	Club	Games (Goals)
1947	South Melbourne	8 (0)
- ^{1} Playing statistics correct to the end of 1947.

Keith Jenkinson (3 November 1926 – 31 December 2014) was an Australian rules footballer who played with South Melbourne in the Victorian Football League (VFL).

Jenkinson died on 31 December 2014, at the age of 88.
