= Marion D. McGowan =

American politician

Member of the South Carolina House of Representatives from the 84th district
- In office 1975–???

Personal details
- Born: December 21, 1927
- Died: December 2, 2014 (aged 86)
- Spouse: Ida Leen Hendrix

Marion D. McGowan (December 21, 1927 – December 2, 2014) was an American politician. He served as a member for the 84th district of the South Carolina House of Representatives.

== Life and career ==
McGowan attended Leasville McCampbell High School and served in the United States Air Force.

In 1975, McGowan was elected to represent the 84th district of the South Carolina House of Representatives.

McGowan died in December 2014, at the age of 86.
