= Rudolf Vanmoerkerke =

Belgian businessman (1924–2014)

Rudolf Vanmoerkerke (Dutch pronunciation: [ˈrydɔl(ə) fɑˈmuːrkɛrkə]; (Note: Both words in isolation: [ˈrydɔl(ə)f] and [vɑˈmuːrkɛrkə].) 7 October 1924 – 4 December 2014) was a Belgian businessman and a pioneer of the Belgian travel industry. He was the former president of the basketball club Sunair (later Telindus, now Base) Oostende.

== Career ==
In 1953 he founded the West Belgian Coach Company, with which he organised bus tours on the European continent especially for British customers. In 1968, he bought the ailing tour operator Sunair, and started to offer air travel vacations.

Six years later he merged all his business in Sun International, which became the dominant travel group in Belgium and in 1984, was registered on the Belgian stock market. In 1976, he started his own airline company Air Belgium, as a counterpart of Trans European Airways (TEA) of his competitor Sunsnacks. He bought several tour operators in the Netherlands, France and the United Kingdom, but only on the British market Vanmoerkerke got a foothold. In 1987, he built the first Sun Parks resort in Oostduinkerke.

Financial problems and the departure of the German group ITS/Kaufhof from the company capital led to the disinvestment of Air Belgium and later also Sunair. After the sale, his son Mark Vanmoerkerke became the owner of Sun Parks.

Vanmoerkerke later occupied himself with the insurance company Sun Assistance and the venture capital company Sofidev, in which also Sofina participates.

Vanmoerkerke died on 4 December 2014, aged 90.

== Sources ==
- F. Verleyen, Rudolf Vanmoerkerke: Met De Zon Als Bondgenoot, Elsevier, 1986, ISBN 90-6982-005-6
- Rudolf Vanmoerkerke (in Dutch)
- Rudolf Vanmoerkerke (80): Ik moet de baas zijn (in Dutch)
