= Rupert Wilkinson =

British historian

Rupert Wilkinson (18 May 1938, in Surrey – 21 December 2014) was a British historian specializing in the history of the United States. He is perhaps best known to the general public for his book, Surviving a Japanese Internment Camp.

Wilkinson's 2014 book, Surviving a Japanese Internment Camp: Life and Liberation at Santo Tomás, Manila, in World War II, was both a memoir of his own childhood incarceration during the Japanese occupation of the Philippines, and a formally researched and highly respected history of the Santo Tomas Internment Camp.

== Childhood ==
Wilkinson was the son of Gerald and Lorna (née Davies) Wilkinson. The family moved to the Philippines when he was a child. His father worked for a sugar company but joined the British Army when World War II began, working as a liaison between the United States Commander in the Philippines, General Douglas MacArthur and the British forces. When the Japanese conquered Manila, Gerald Wilkinson was able to flee with the British forces, but his wife, Lorna, son Rupert and daughter Mary June spend three years interned in a Japanese camp.
