= Tsang Siu-fo =

John Tsang Siu-fo (Chinese: 曾昭科; 18 June 1923 – 18 December 2014) was a Chinese police officer of the Hong Kong police force until he was discovered to be a communist spy.

== Career ==
Tsang was born in Guangzhou, China. He was the highest-ranking Chinese member of the Hong Kong Police Force in the 1960s, when Hong Kong was part of the British colony. The Hong Kong government announced on 6 October 1961 that Tsang is to be detained. On 30 November of the same year, he was announced publicly to be involved in espionage spying activities for the Chinese Communist Party. He was deported to the People's Republic of China.

In 1978 he returned to live in Guangzhou. He later worked at Jinan University and Guangdong University of Foreign Studies.

In 2002 he was asked by the media whether he was returning to Hong Kong. He said he was a Hong Kong citizen then and now. And that the Hong Kong Chief Executive should vindicate him so he can rehabilitated.

== See also ==
- 1960s in Hong Kong
- Yeung Kwong
