= Roberto Sagastume Pinto =

Guatemalan politician and educator

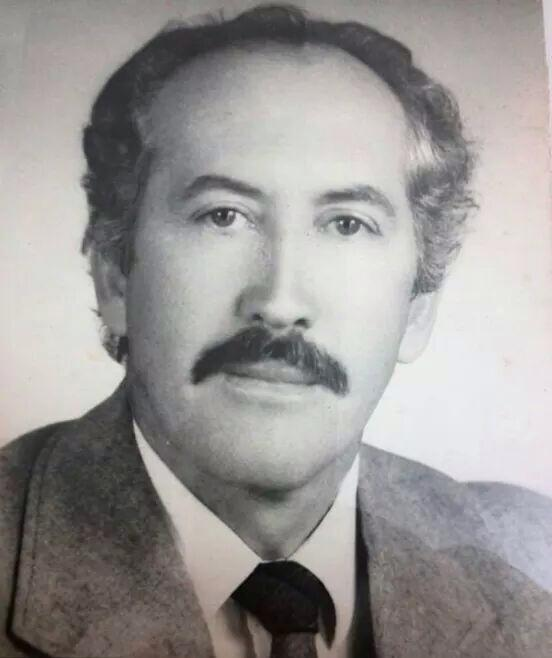
Pinto in 1986

Roberto Obdulio Sagastume Pinto (24 November 1944 – 1 December 2014) was a Guatemalan politician and educator. He served as Mayor of Esquipulas from 1986 through 1988 and again from 1996 through 2000. Pinto also served as Governor of Chiquimula from 2001 through 2003. Pinto was born in Esquipulas, Guatemala.

Pinto died in a car crash in Esquipulas, Guatemala, aged 70.
