= Dominique Aubier =

French author

Dominique Aubier, née Marie-Louise Labiste, (7 May 1922 – 2 December 2014) was a French author.

== Life ==
Born in Cuers, France, she studied in Nizza and served in the French Resistance in 1944. Aubier lived in Spain for 30 years before returning to France.

== Career ==
Aubier wrote forty books over a fifty-year span, including six novels and two books about Spanish bullfighting, Fiesta in Sevilla and Fiesta in Pamplona. Many of her books had esoteric themes, including a book about Indian Cinema and its symbolism, and several controversial books about Miguel de Cervantes's Don Quixote alleged cabalistic encoding. Dismissed by Cervantes scholars, Jean Canavaggio (emeritus Professor of Spanish Literature at the University of Paris X-Nanterre, Goncourt Price of the biography for his book "Cervantès"), one of the greatest experts on Cervantes, considered it a hoax.

== Films about Dominique Aubier ==
- After the Storm.Directed by Joële van Effenterre English subtitle. The meaning of a cataclysm.90 mn, 35 mm, production Mallia - film/ Les Documents Cinématographique/ Centre National du Cinéma. vidéo.
- The Secret of Don Quijote. El Secreto de Don Quijote. English subtitle. Spain. 2005. 52 min. Colour. Documental. DV CAM. Direction, Photography and Editing: Raúl Fernández Rincón. Production: LUCA FILMS S.L. / Producer: Raúl Fernández and Alberto Martínez.
