= Lawrence Dorr =

Hungarian-American writer

Lawrence Dorr (1925 – December 7, 2014) was the pen name of Janos Shoemyen, a Hungarian-American author born in Budapest, Hungary. He escaped from his homeland during the Soviet occupation and endured an itinerant life in immediate post-war Europe. He tried first to emigrate to the United Kingdom and then to the USA where he finally settled in Gainesville, Florida. He authored a number of short story collections including A Slow Soft River, A Bearer of Divine Revelation, and A Slight Momentary Affliction, which was nominated for the Pulitzer Prize for Fiction. His short stories appeared in the literary journalsVirginia Quarterly Review and Image.

Dorr's work is best known for its highly literary, almost poetic quality, and the strong presence of faith and Christianity. In these works he frequently deals with the after-effects of World War II, both on his homeland and the individual. His later work is heavily influenced by the landscape of south and north Florida as it flashbacks to the horrors faced before his escape from occupied Budapest.
