= Hugh Pond =

British army officer

Hubert "Hugh" Charles Pond (22 February 1923 – 19 December 2014) was an officer in the British Army Parachute Regiment, who won the Military Cross during a daring attack on the Merville battery in Normandy on D-Day.

Pond was later mentioned in despatches for his service with the Commonwealth Division in Korea.

After leaving the Army, Pond became the military correspondent of the Daily Express and, in 1961 joined the Tupperware Company where he became a senior executive.
