= Theill Drengsgaard =

Danish footballer (1927–2014)

Personal information
- Date of birth: 6 March 1927
- Place of birth: Feldingbjerg, Denmark
- Date of death: 2 December 2014 (aged 87)
- Position: Goalkeeper

International career
Years	Team	Apps	(Gls)
1956–1957	Denmark	2	(0)

Theill Drengsgaard (6 March 1927 – 2 December 2014) was a Danish footballer. He played in two matches for the Denmark national football team from 1956 to 1957.
