= Earl Clark (US Army officer) =

Lt-Colonel Earl Ervin Clark (3 July 1919 – 28 December 2014) was an American soldier, an officer in the US Army's 10th Mountain Division during World War II, and helped to create the skiing industry in the US.
