= Brian Dunsworth =

Canadian football player

Profile
- Position: Halfback

Personal information
- Born: May 4, 1925; Edmonton, Alberta
- Died: December 4, 2014 (aged 89); Edmonton, Alberta
- Listed height: 5 ft 9 in (1.75 m)
- Listed weight: 175 lb (79 kg)

Career information
- High school: Eastglen

Career history
- 1949–1950: Edmonton Eskimos

Brian Lee Dunsworth (May 4, 1925 – December 4, 2014) was a Canadian professional football player who played for the Edmonton Eskimos. He previously played junior football in Edmonton.
