= Stuart Hunt =

American educator and politician

Stuart W. Hunt, Sr. (April 28, 1927 – December 9, 2014) was an American educator and politician.

Born in Brattleboro, Vermont, Hunt served in the United States Army Air Forces in 1945. In 1952, he received his bachelor's degree from Arnold College (now the University of Bridgeport) and taught at Brattleboro High School. Hunt lived in Guilford, Vermont. He was also in the insurance and real estate business. Hunt was a Republican. He was in the Vermont House of Representatives and then in the Vermont State Senate. He died in Vernon, Vermont.
