= Chen Shi-chang =

Taiwanese politician (1934–2014)

Chen Shi-chang MLY
- 陳錫章

Member of the National Assembly
- In office 30 May 2005 – 7 June 2005

Member of the Legislative Yuan
- In office 1 February 1993 – 31 January 1996
- Constituency: Yunlin County

Member of the Control Yuan
- In office 1987–1993

Member of the Taiwan Provincial Consultative Council
- In office 20 May 1977 – 1987
- Constituency: Yunlin County

Personal details
- Born: 6 May 1934
- Died: 25 December 2014 (aged 80)
- Party: Kuomintang
- Occupation: Politician

Chen Shi-chang (Chinese: 陳錫章; pinyin: Chén Xīzhāng; 6 May 1934 – 25 December 2014) was a Taiwanese politician.

Chen served on the Huwei Township Council before he was elected to the Yunlin County Council. From 1977 to 1987, he was a member of the Taiwan Provincial Consultative Council, when he was named to the Control Yuan. Chen then served as a member of the Legislative Yuan between 1993 and 1996. He was elected to the fourth National Assembly in 2005.

Chen was diagnosed with esophageal cancer in 2013, but refused treatment. He died of multiple organ failure at home, aged 80, on 25 December 2014.
