= 2014 in New Zealand =

- Decades: 1990s; 2000s; 2010s; 2020s
- See also: History of New Zealand; List of years in New Zealand; Timeline of New Zealand history

The following lists events that happened during 2014 in New Zealand.

== Population ==
National

Estimated populations as at 30 June:

- New Zealand total – 4,509,900
- North Island – 3,450,800
- South Island – 1,058,500

Main urban areas

Following the 2013 census, Statistics New Zealand added Blenheim to the list of main urban areas, increasing the total number to 17.

Estimated populations as at 30 June:

- Auckland – 1,413,500
- Blenheim – 30,200
- Christchurch – 375,200
- Dunedin – 116,200
- Gisborne – 35,400
- Hamilton – 218,800
- Invercargill – 49,800
- Kapiti – 41,000
- Napier-Hastings – 128,800
- Nelson – 64,100
- New Plymouth – 55,600
- Palmerston North – 82,400
- Rotorua – 56,200
- Tauranga – 127,700
- Wellington – 393,600
- Whanganui – 39,200
- Whangārei – 54,400

== Incumbents ==
=== Regal and vice-regal ===
- Head of State – Elizabeth II
- Governor-General – Jerry Mateparae
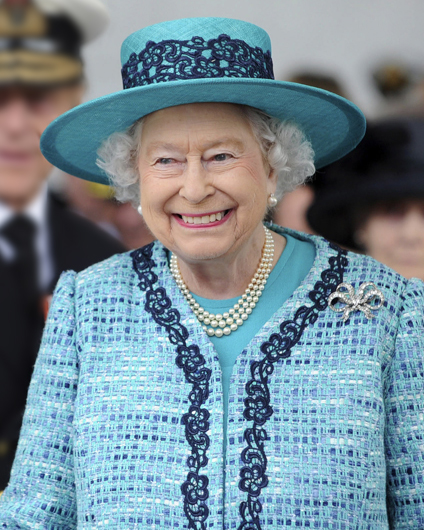
Elizabeth II

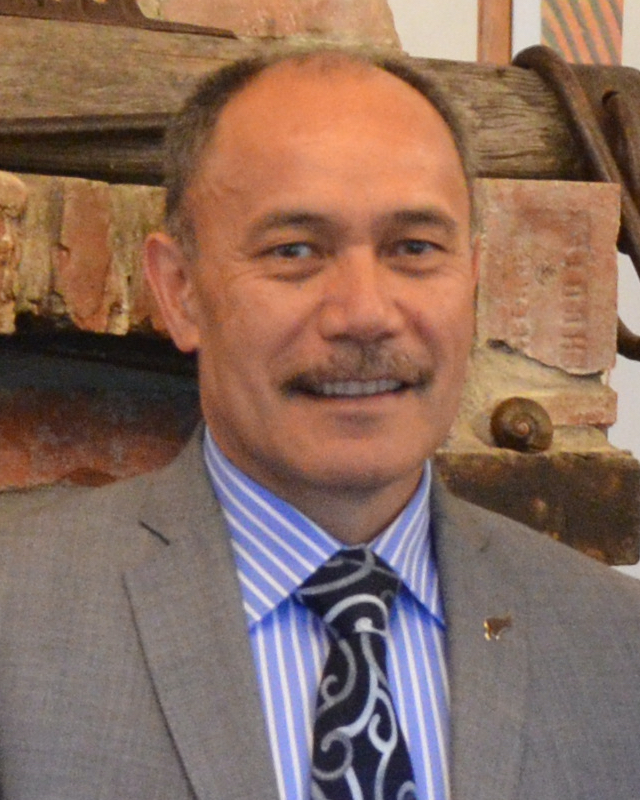
Jerry Mateparae

=== Government ===
Legislative term: 50th New Zealand Parliament until 14 August, then 51st New Zealand Parliament from 20 October.

The Fifth National Government, first elected in 2008, continues.

- Speaker of the House – David Carter
- Prime Minister – John Key
- Deputy Prime Minister – Bill English
- Leader of the House – Gerry Brownlee
- Minister of Finance – Bill English
- Minister of Foreign Affairs – Murray McCully
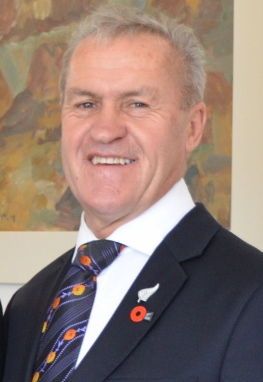
David Carter

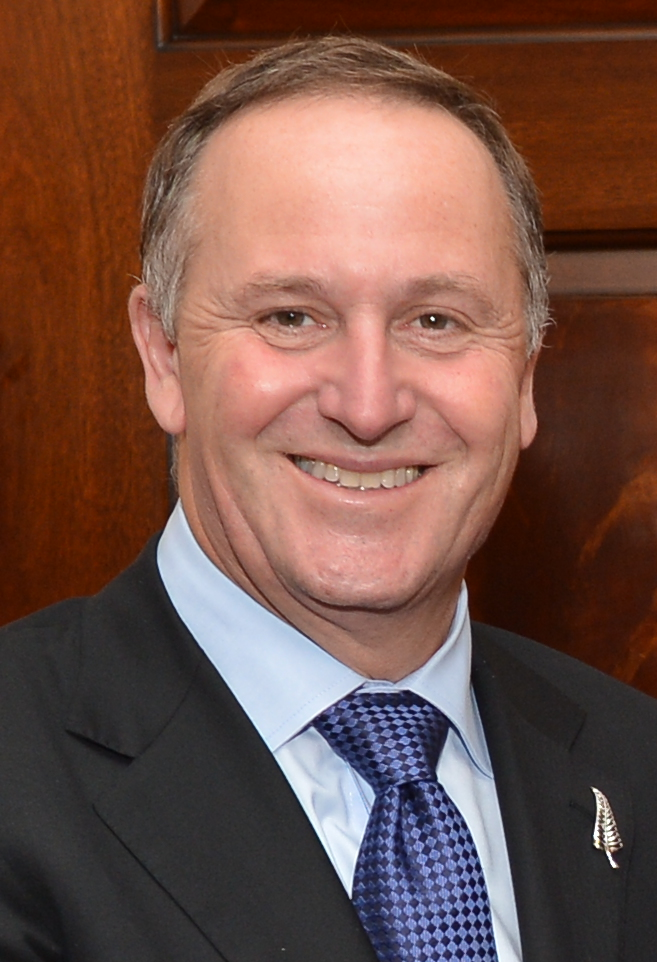
John Key

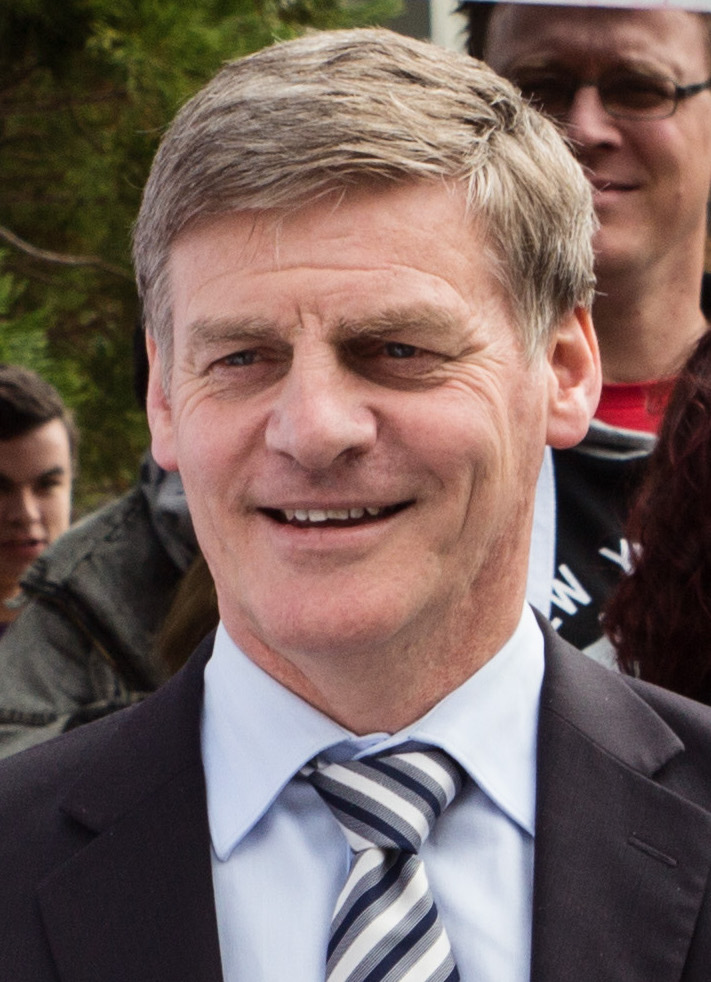
Bill English

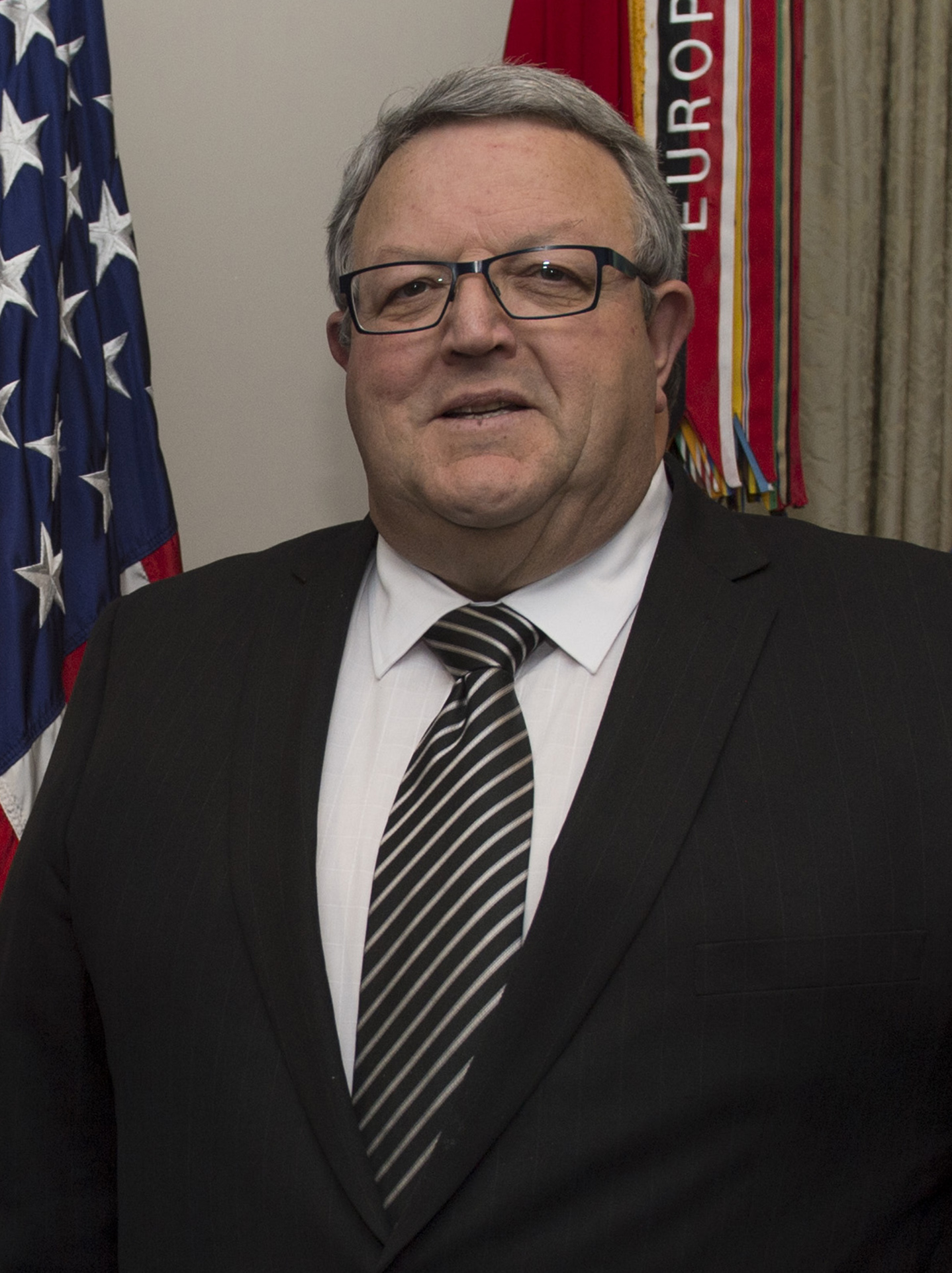
Gerry Brownlee

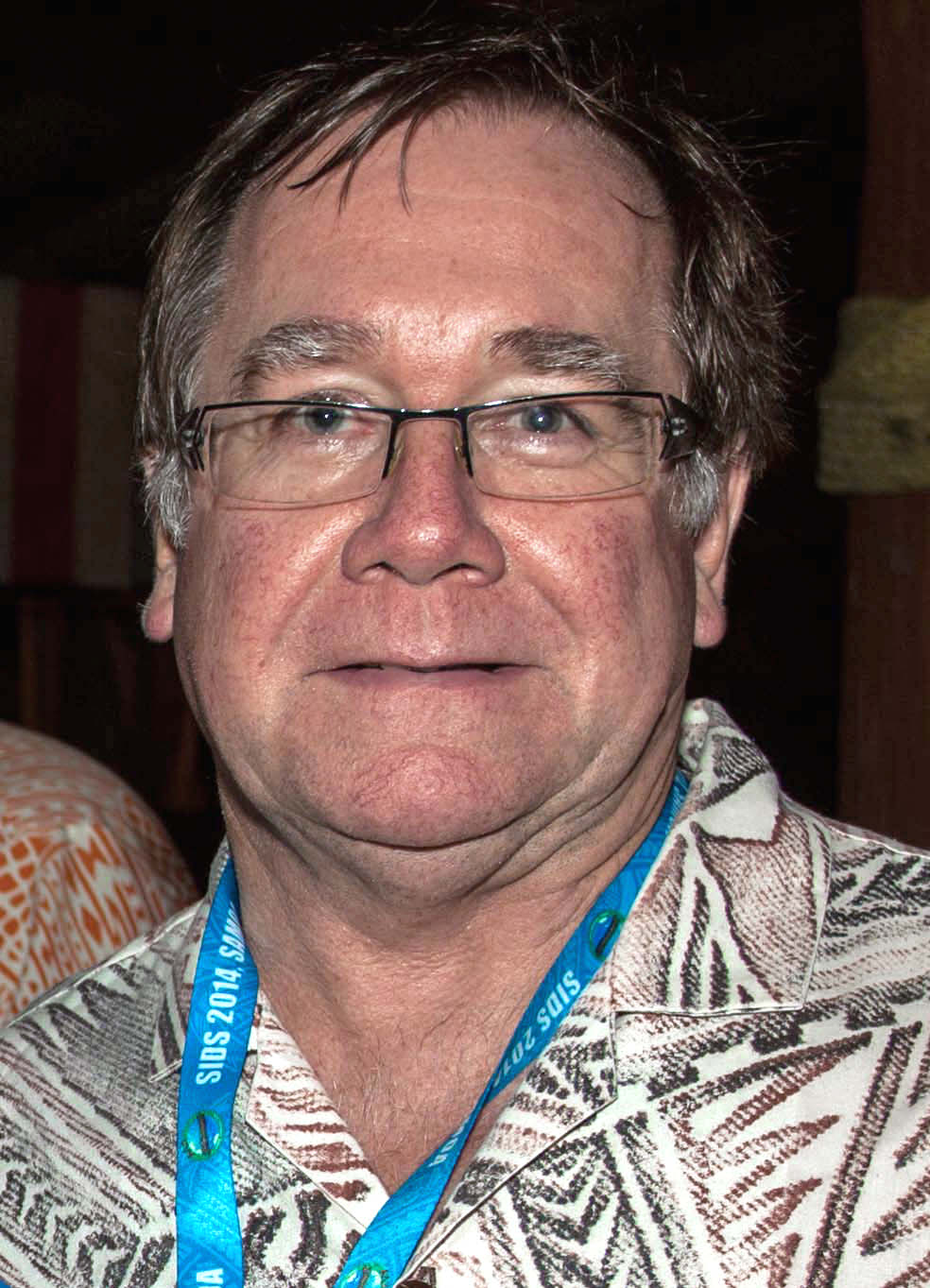
Murray McCully

=== Other party leaders in parliament ===
- Labour – David Cunliffe until 27 September, then Andrew Little from 18 November
- Green – Russel Norman and Metiria Turei
- New Zealand First – Winston Peters
- Māori Party – Tariana Turia until 20 September then Marama Fox from 3 November, and Te Ururoa Flavell
- United Future – Peter Dunne
- Mana Party – Hone Harawira until 20 September
- ACT – David Seymour from 3 October
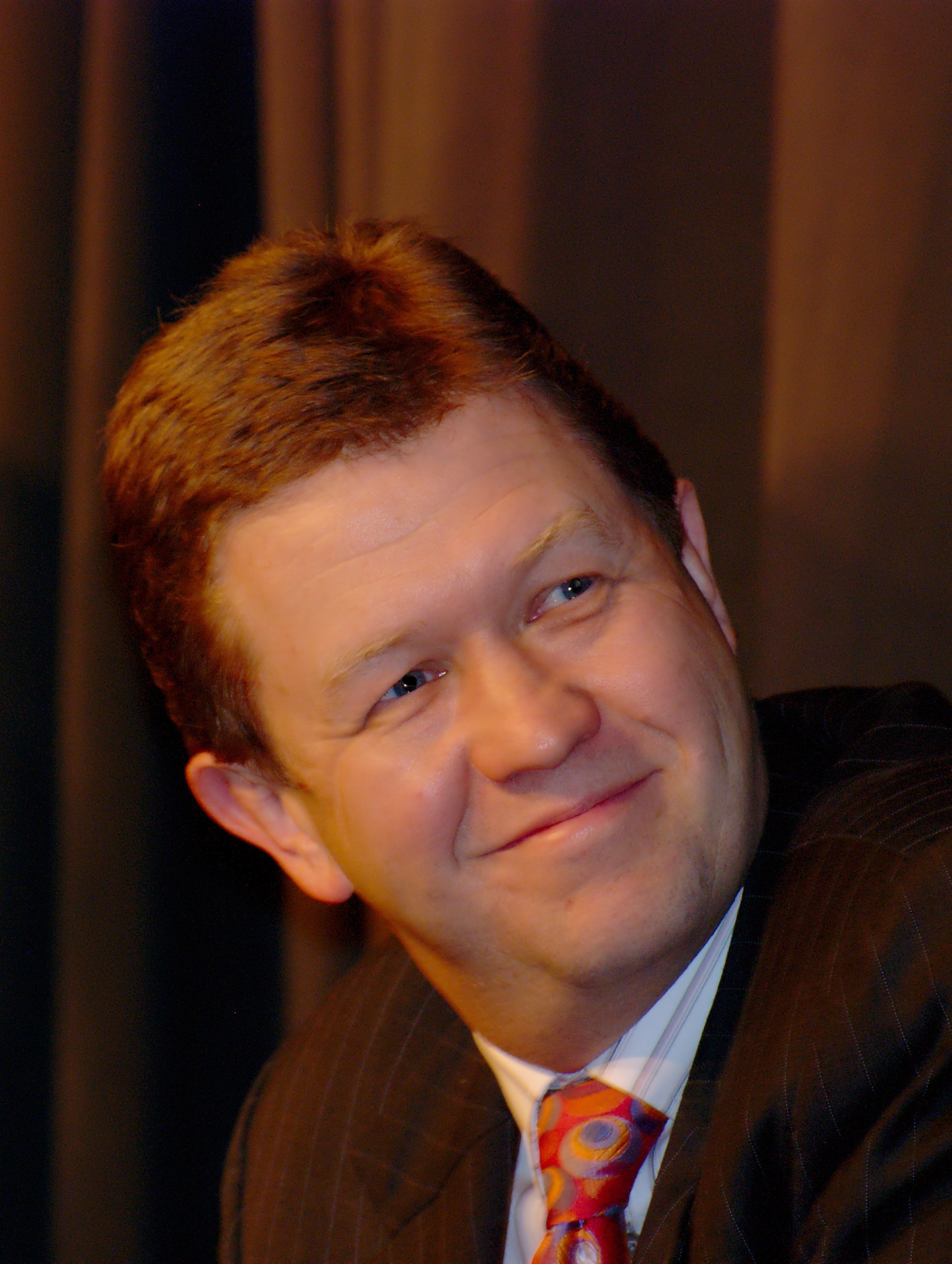
David Cunliffe

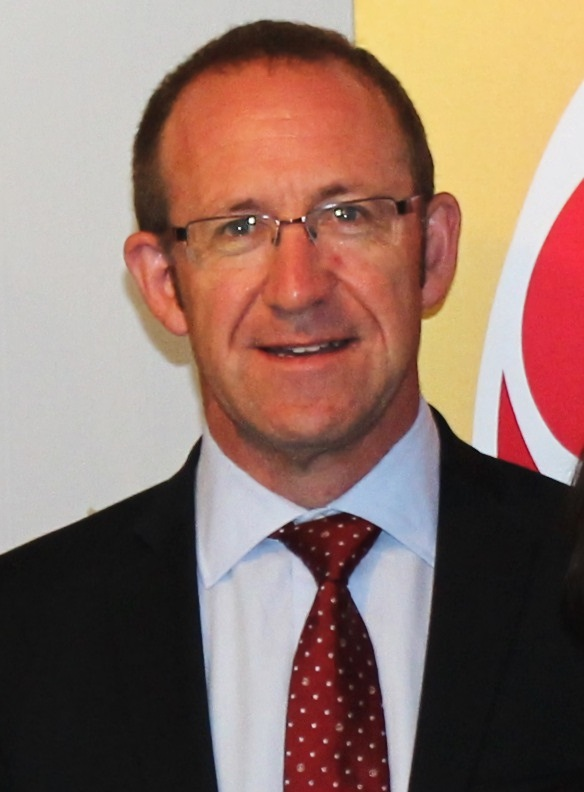
Andrew Little

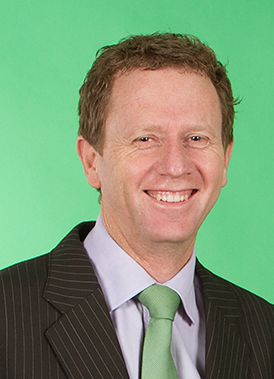
Russel Norman

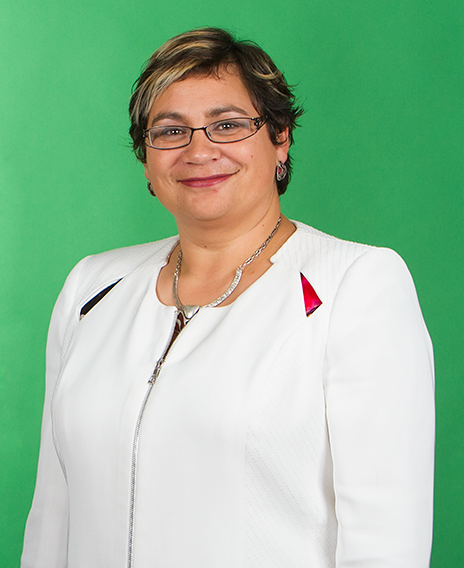
Metiria Turei

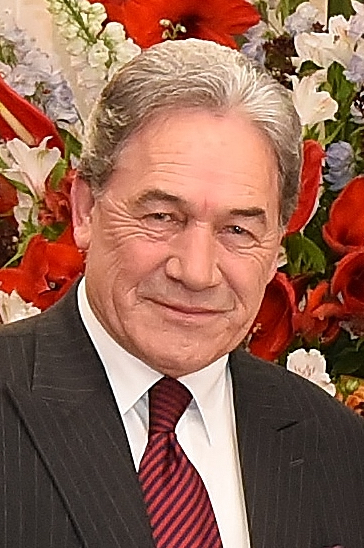
Winston Peters

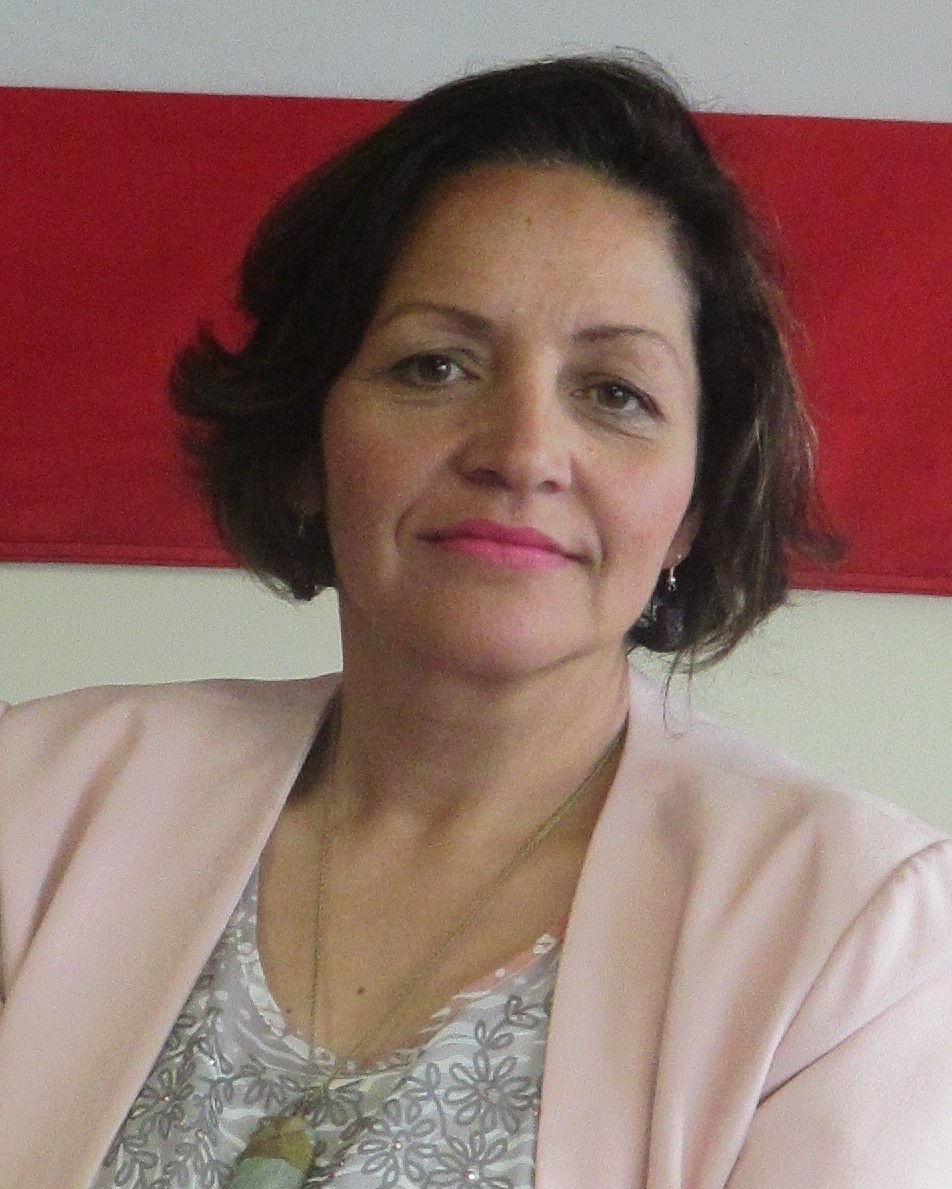
Marama Fox

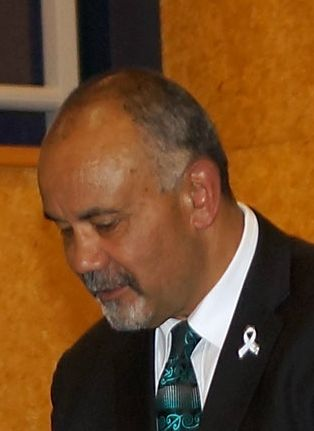
Te Ururoa Flavell

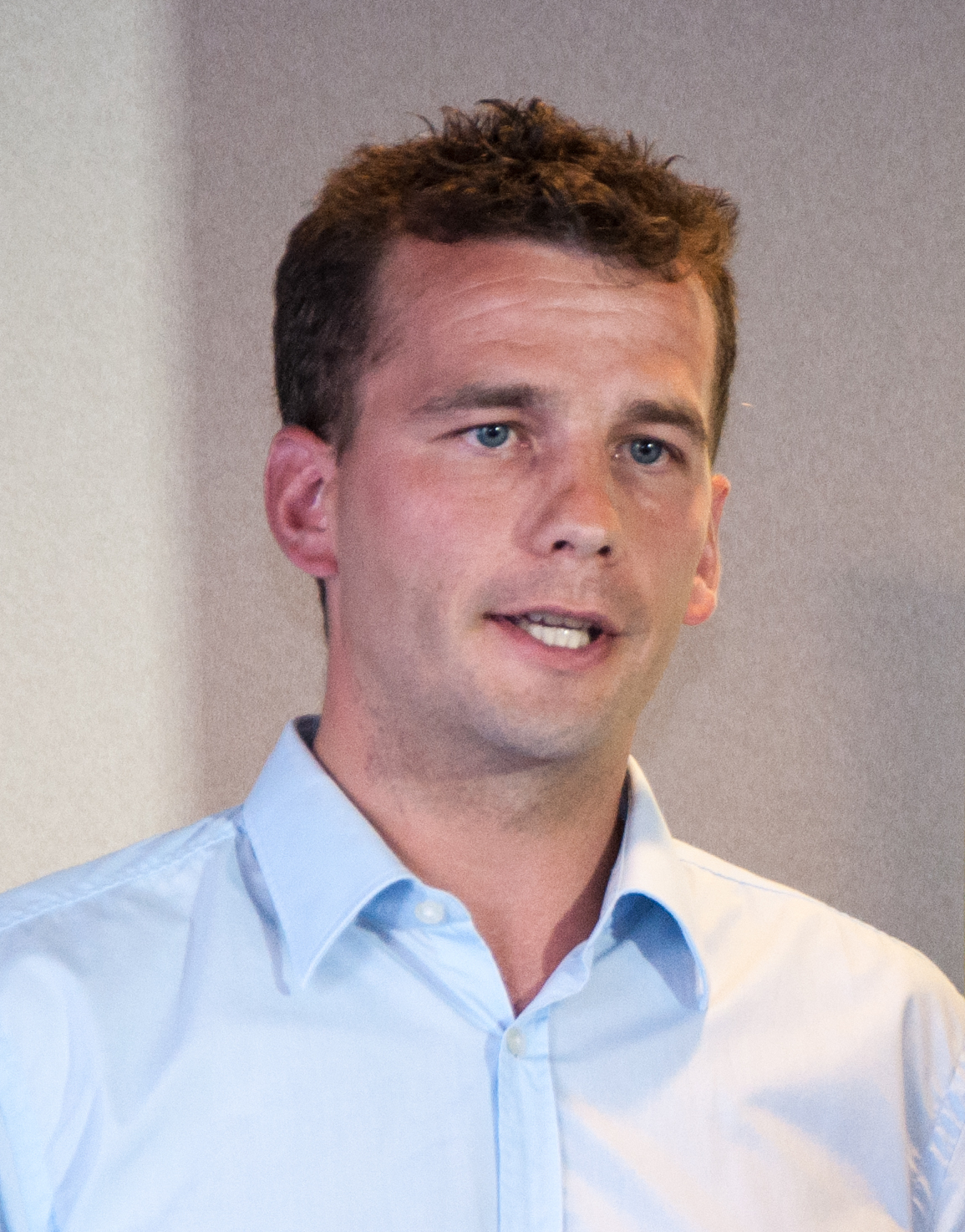
David Seymour

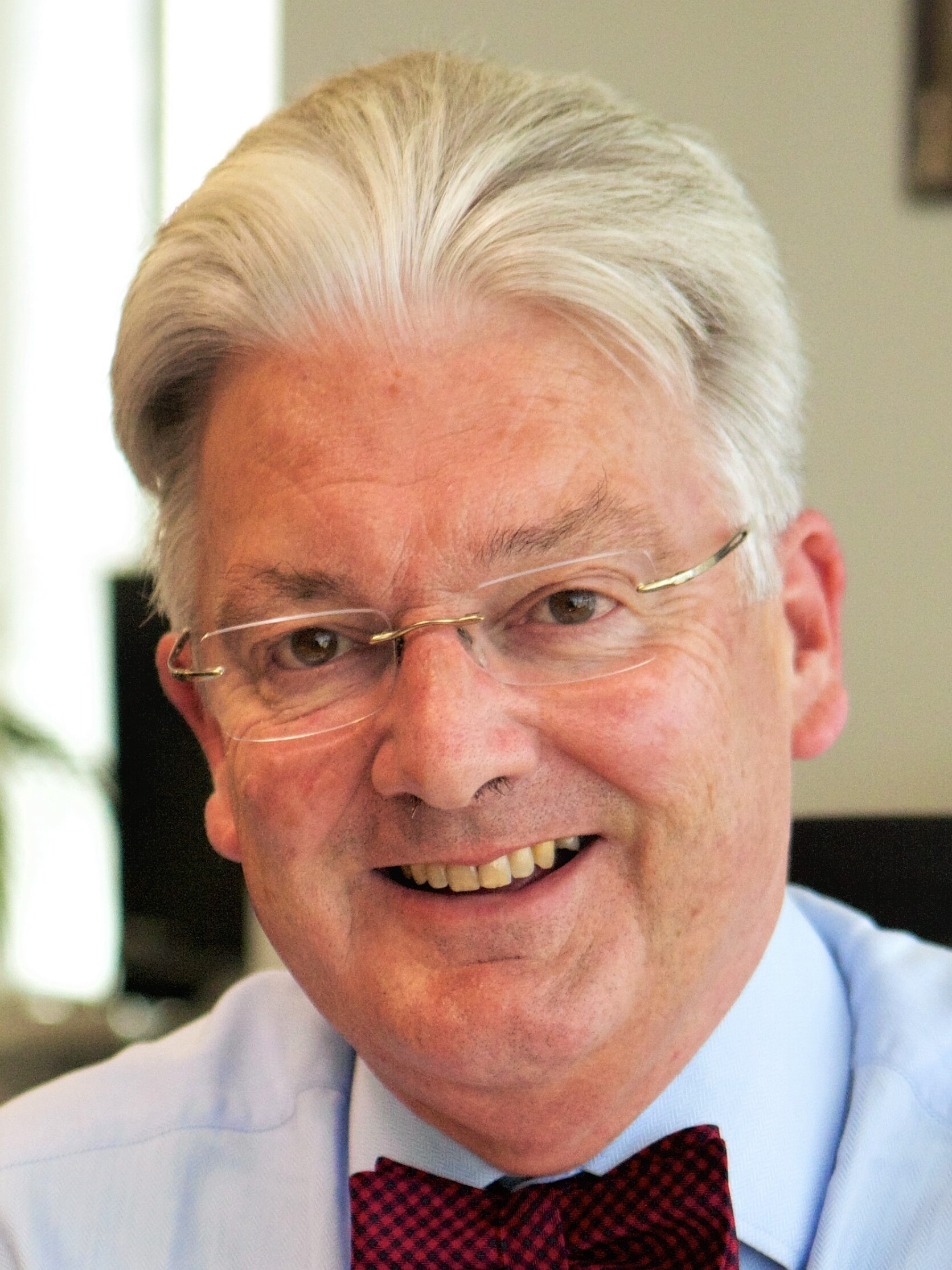
Peter Dunne

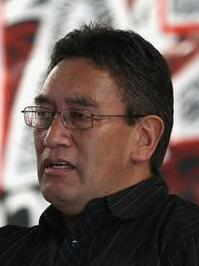
Hone Harawira

=== Judiciary ===
- Chief Justice – Sian Elias
- President of the Court of Appeal – Mark O'Regan until 1 September, and then Ellen France
- Chief High Court judge – Helen Winkelmann
- Chief District Court judge – Jan-Marie Doogue
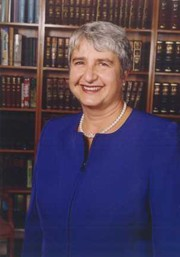
Sian Elias

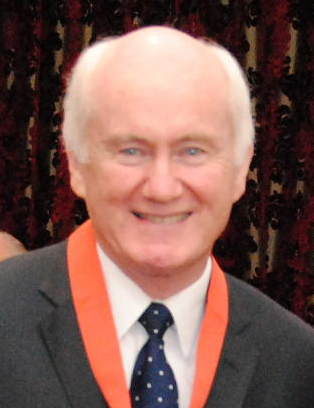
Mark O'Regan

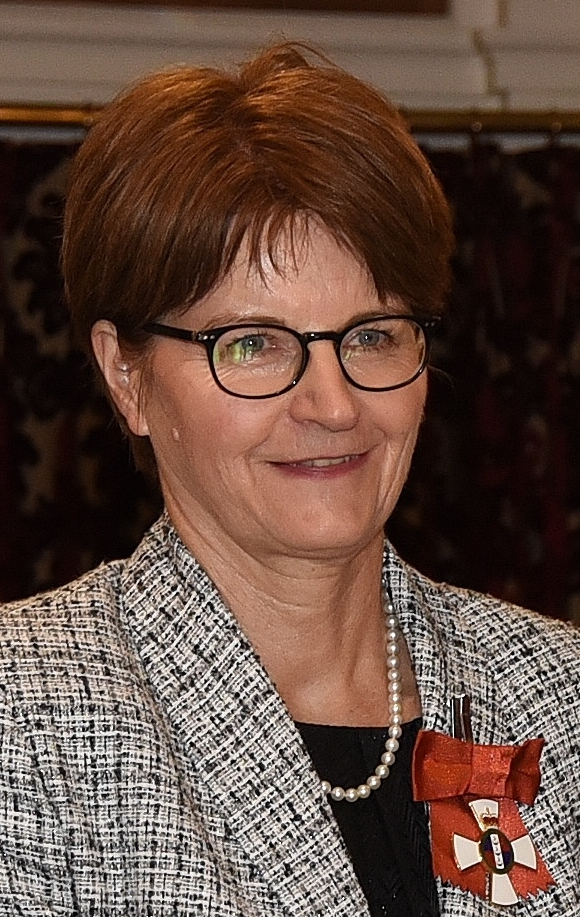
Ellen France

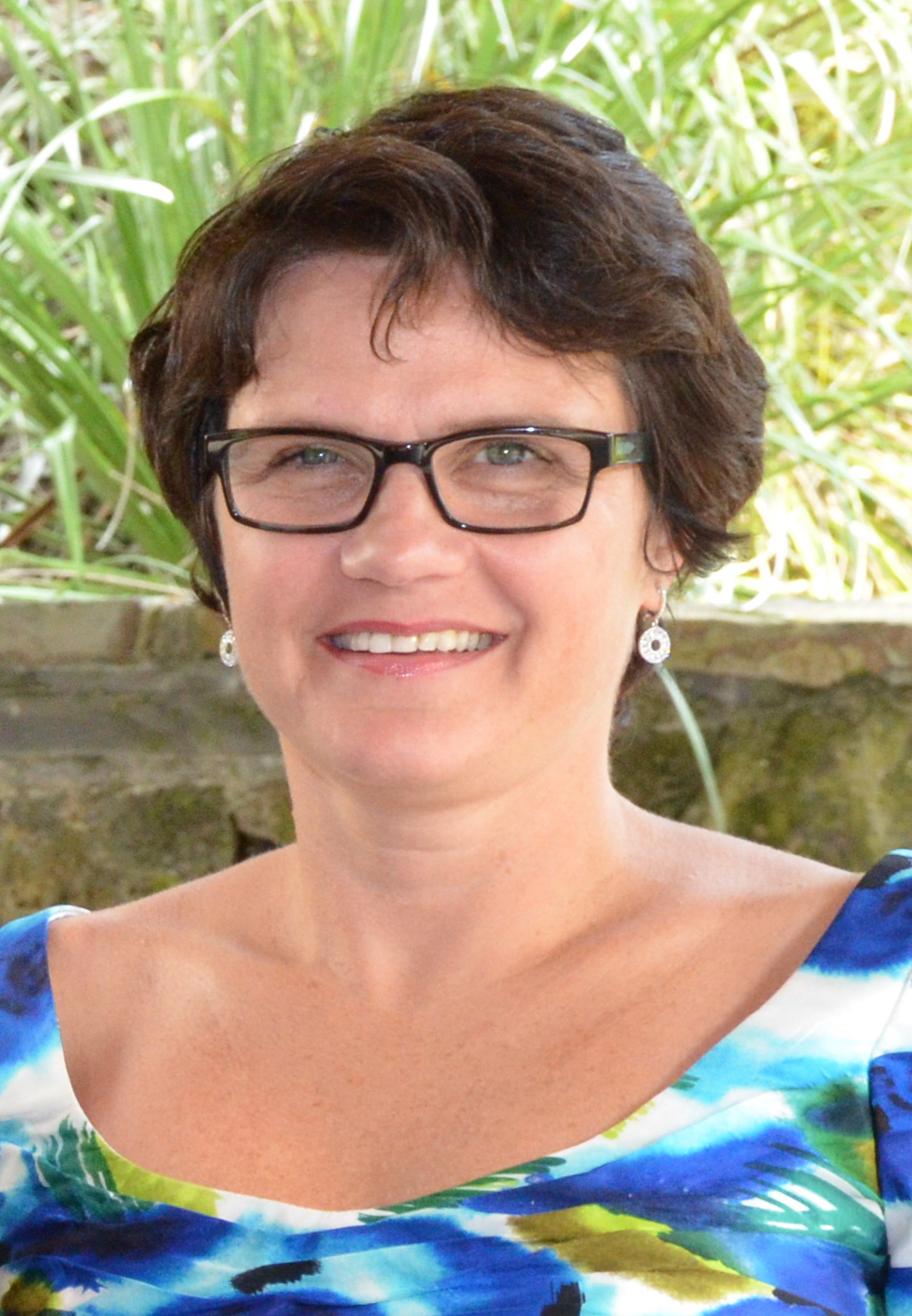
Helen Winkelmann

=== Main centre leaders ===
- Mayor of Auckland – Len Brown
- Mayor of Tauranga – Stuart Crosby
- Mayor of Hamilton – Julie Hardaker
- Mayor of Wellington – Celia Wade-Brown
- Mayor of Christchurch – Lianne Dalziel
- Mayor of Dunedin – Dave Cull
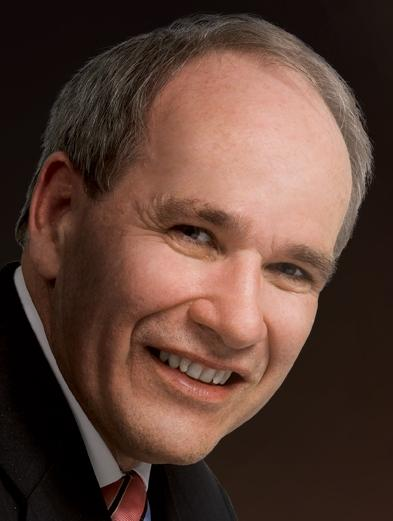
Len Brown

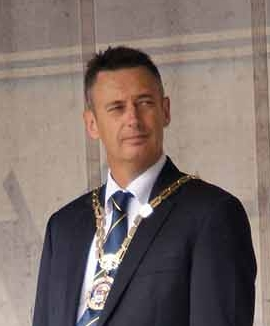
Stuart Crosby

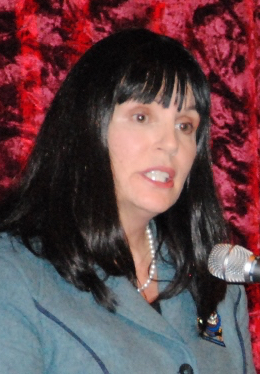
Julie Hardaker

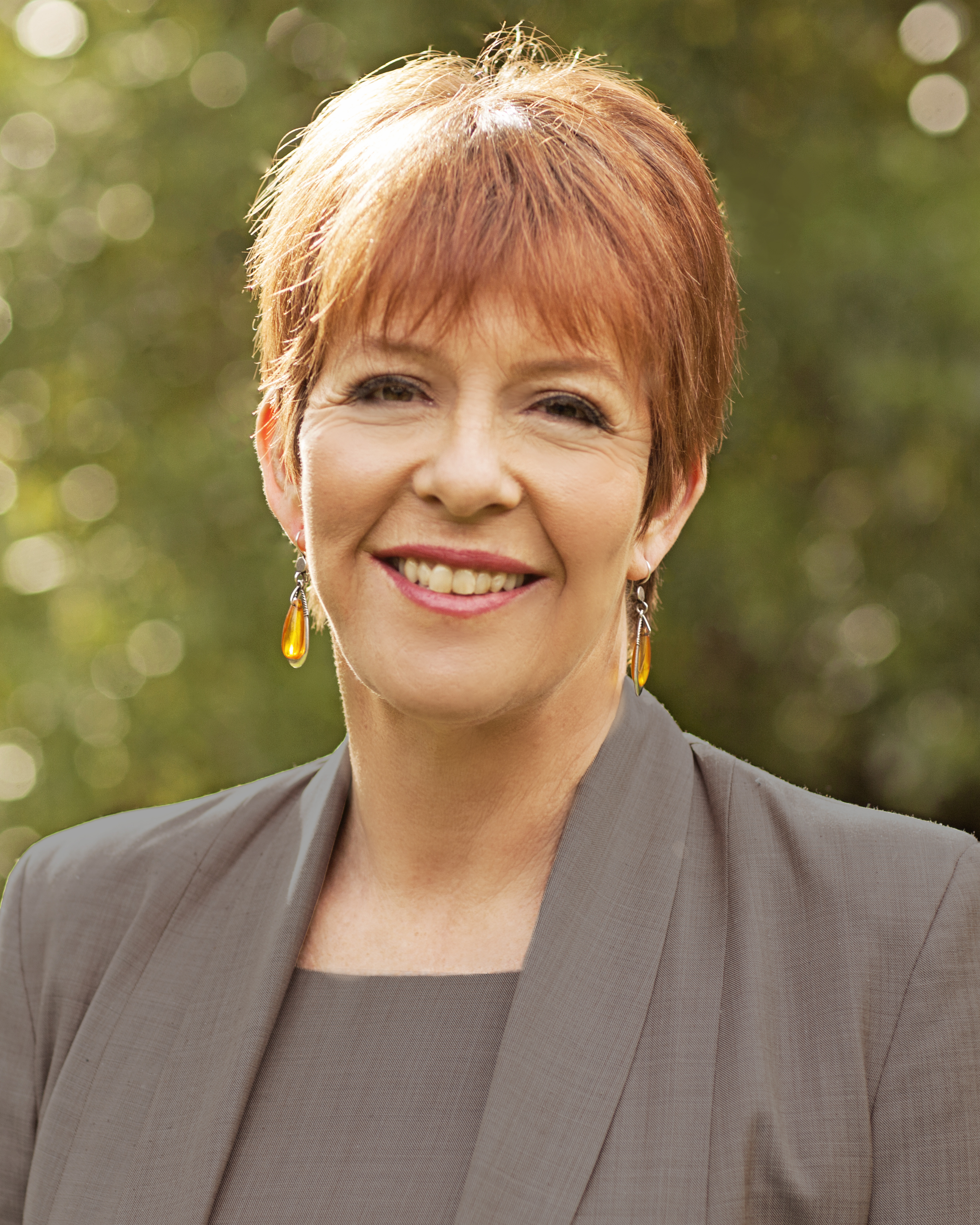
Celia Wade-Brown

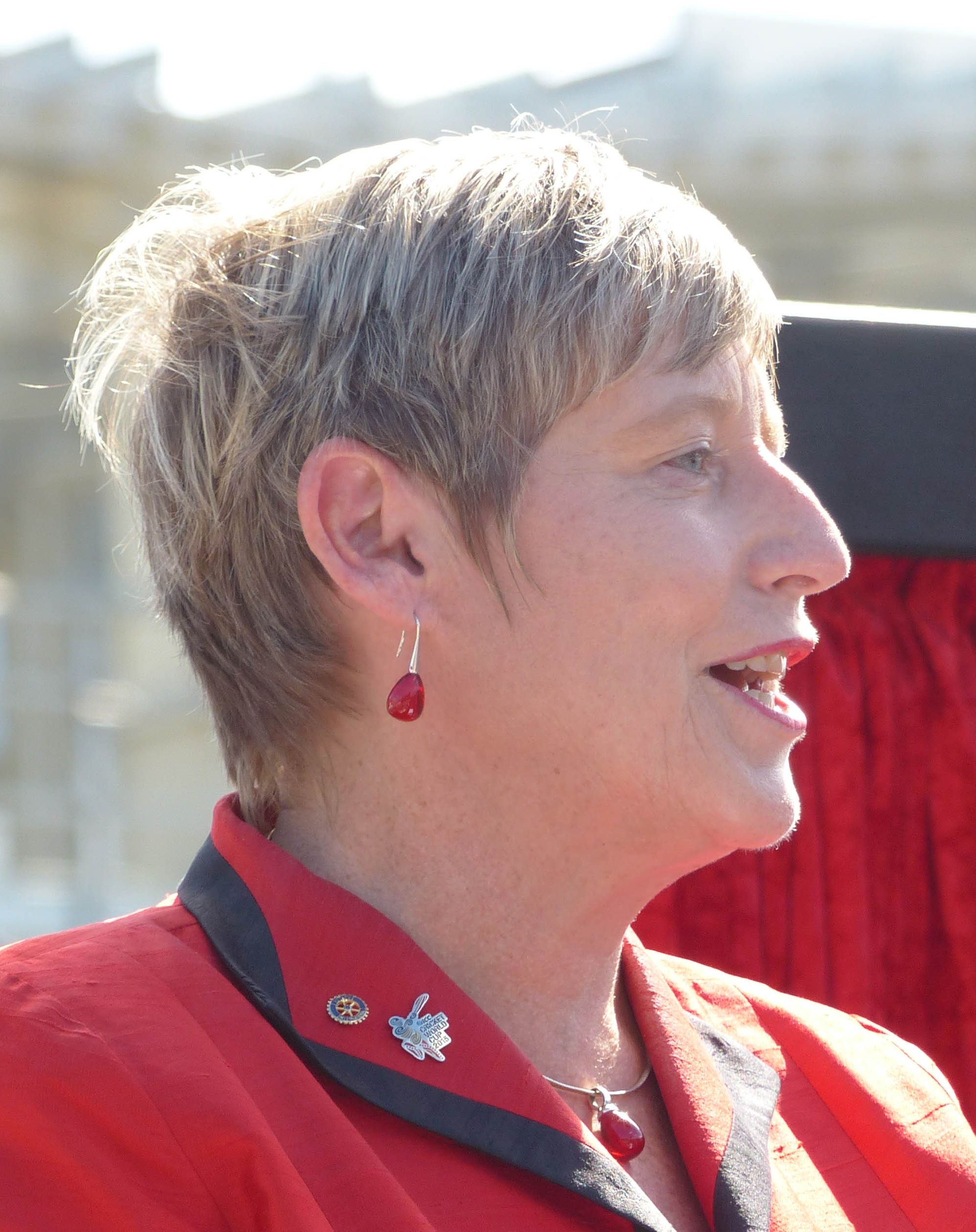
Lianne Dalziell

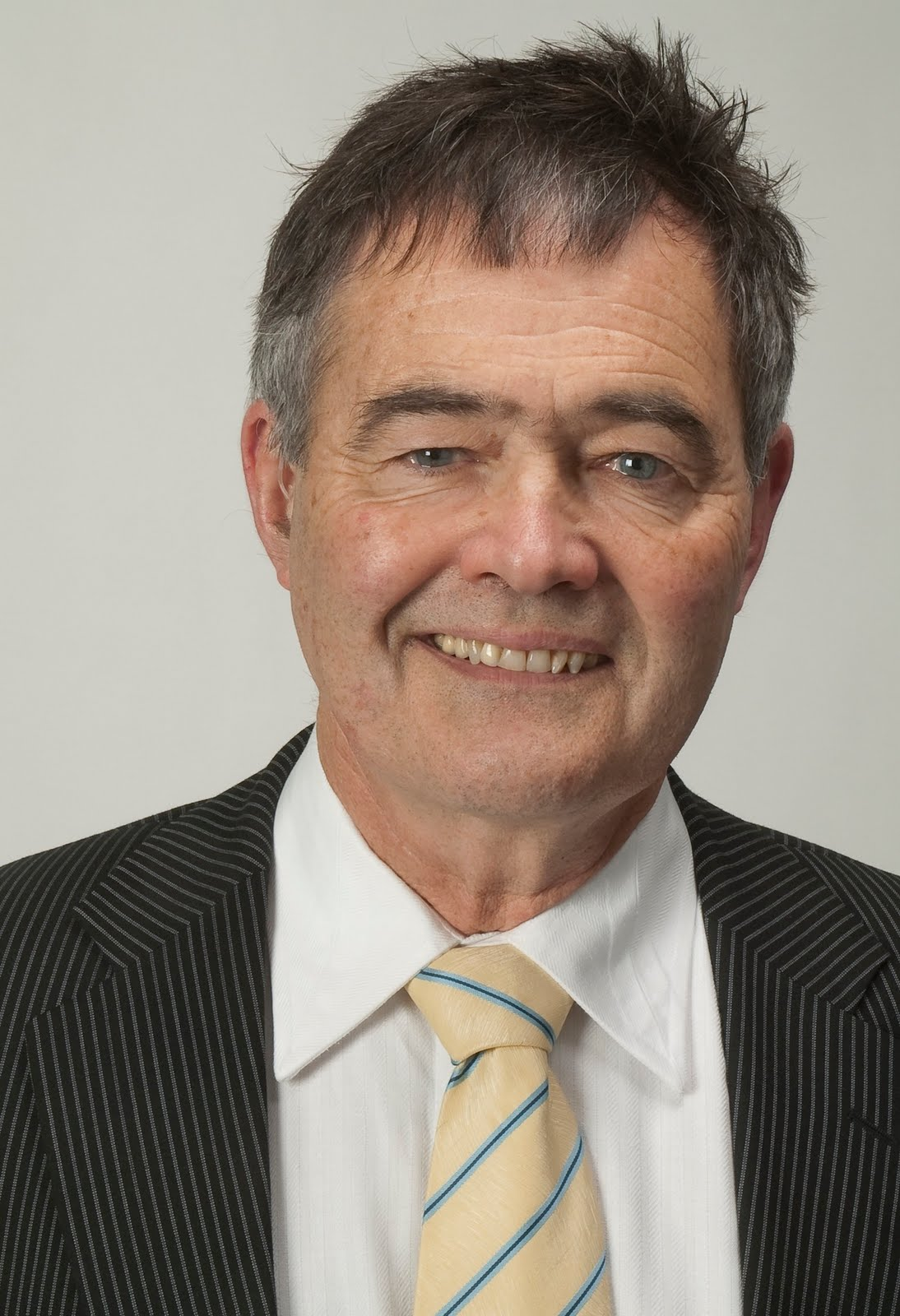
Dave Cull

== Arts and literature ==
=== Performing arts ===
Benny Award presented by the Variety Artists Club of New Zealand to Tina Cross.

== Events ==
=== January ===
- 20 January – A 6.2 magnitude earthquake occurs near Eketāhuna in the Manawatu-Wanganui region, causing moderate damage in Masterton and Palmerston North.

=== March ===
- 8 March – Waitawa Regional Park opens.
- March – Over 100 homes are flooded in Christchurch.

=== April ===
- 7–16 April – Prince William, Duke of Cambridge, Catherine, Duchess of Cambridge and Prince George of Cambridge visit New Zealand on an official tour. It is Catherine and George's first visit to New Zealand.

=== June ===
- 23 June – The 2014 New Zealand bravery awards are announced to honour acts of bravery after the 2011 Christchurch earthquake.

=== July ===
- 11–21 July – Severe flooding damages thousands of properties in the Northland and Auckland regions.

=== August ===
- 13 August – Nicky Hager's book Dirty Politics: How attack politics is poisoning New Zealand’s political environment is published.
- 28 August – Spark New Zealand launches its Lightbox streaming service.

=== September ===
- 1 September – A gunman shoots dead two people and injures a third at the Work and Income office in Ashburton. The town is locked down for seven hours while police search for and apprehend the suspected gunman.
- 20 September – The 2014 general election is held.

=== October ===
- 16 October – New Zealand is elected to the United Nations Security Council for two years (2015–16) on the first ballot.
- October – Demand for Lewis Road Creamery chocolate milk is so high that it is often sold out in supermarkets within hours of opening. The demand saw the placement of security guards to monitor fridges, the implementation of rationing and purchase limits, and the creation of black markets.

=== November ===
- 17 November – A magnitude 6.5 earthquake strikes 150km east of Te Araroa, Gisborne.
- 18 November – Andrew Little replaces David Cunliffe as leader of the Labour Party in the 2014 leadership election.

== Holidays and observances ==
=== National public holidays ===
Public holidays in New Zealand in 2014 are as follows:

- 1 January – New Year's Day
- 2 January – Day after New Year's Day
- 6 February – Waitangi Day
- 18 April – Good Friday
- 21 April – Easter Monday
- 25 April – Anzac Day
- 2 June – Queen's Birthday
- 27 October – Labour Day
- 25 December – Christmas Day
- 26 December – Boxing Day

=== Provincial anniversaries ===
Provincial anniversary days in New Zealand in 2014 are as follows:

- 20 January – Wellington
- 27 January – Auckland
- 3 February – Nelson
- 10 March – Taranaki
- 24 March – Otago
- 22 April – Southland
- 22 September – South Canterbury
- 24 October – Hawke’s Bay
- 3 November – Marlborough
- 14 November – Canterbury
- 1 December – Westland and Chatham Islands

== Sport ==
=== Basketball ===
- New Zealand's men's basketball team finished 15th at the 2014 FIBA Basketball World Cup

=== Commonwealth Games ===
Gold	Silver	Bronze	Total
14	14	17	45

=== Olympic Games ===
- New Zealand sends a team of 15 competitors in five sports.

Gold	Silver	Bronze	Total
0	0	0	0

=== Paralympic Games ===
- New Zealand sends a team of three competitors in one sport.

Gold	Silver	Bronze	Total
0	1	0	1

=== Rowing ===
- New Zealand Secondary School Championships (Maadi Cup)
  - Maadi Cup (boys U18 eight) – Hamilton Boys' High School
  - Levin 75th Jubilee Cup (girls U18 eight) – Waikato Diocesan School
  - Star Trophy (overall points) – Hamilton Boys' High School

=== Rugby ===
- Ranfurly Shield – Hawke's Bay defeat Counties Manukau 27–21 to become the new holders of the shield.

=== Shooting ===
- Ballinger Belt – Diane Collings (Te Puke)

== Births ==
- 13 September – Vin De Dance, Thoroughbred racehorse
- 26 September – Melody Belle, Thoroughbred racehorse
- 12 November – Grunt, Thoroughbred racehorse

== Deaths ==
=== January ===
- 2 January – Terry Magaoa Chapman, Niuean public servant (born c.1944)
- 15 January – Joyce Fenton, fencer (born 1927)
- 16 January – John G. Cleary, computer science academic, promoter of Transcendental Meditation (born 1950)
- 20 January
  - Graeme Dallow, police officer (born 1930)
  - John Mackey, Roman Catholic Bishop of Auckland (1974–83) (born 1918)
- 29 January – George Griffiths, historian (born 1933)
- 30 January
  - John Branthwaite, Anglican priest (born 1927)
  - Mr Tiz, Thoroughbred racehorse (foaled 1984)

=== February ===
- 3 February – Alister Leat, judoka (born 1985)
- 5 February – Gary Giles, cricketer (born 1940)
- 7 February – Tim Dalton, rugby union player (born 1940)
- 11 February – Olga Jekyll, fencer (born 1918)
- 19 February – Graeme Lowans, cricketer (born 1934)
- 20 February
  - Ian McKay, Judge of the Court of Appeal (1991–97) (born 1929)
  - Anthony Whitaker, herpetologist (born 1944)
- 22 February – Charlotte Dawson, television personality (born 1966)
- 24 February – Alexis Hunter, artist (born 1948)
- 25 February – David McKinney, author and journalist (born 1945)
- 28 February – Donald Murdoch, cricketer (born 1923)

=== March ===
- 5 March – Little Bridge, Thoroughbred racehorse (foaled 2006)
- 10 March – John Pring, rugby union referee (born 1927)
- 13 March – Vince McGlone, seaman and television personality (born 1916)
- 16 March – Frank Oliver, rugby union player and coach, All Blacks captain (born 1948)
- 19 March – Gordon Patrick, cyclist (born 1914)
- 20 March – Bill Toomath, architect (born 1925)
- 21 March – David Beaglehole, physicist (born 1938)
- 23 March – David Henshaw, cartoonist (born 1939)
- 24 March – Margaret di Menna, microbiologist (born 1923)
- 31 March – David Hannay, film producer (born 1939)

=== April ===
- 1 April – Merimeri Penfold, Māori language academic (born 1920)
- 3 April – Dame Dorothy Winstone, educationalist and academic (born 1919)
- 6 April – Charles Farthing, doctor specialising in the treatment of HIV/AIDS (born 1953)
- 8 April – Ivan Mercep, architect (born 1930)
- 15 April
  - Jim Sprott, analytical chemist, forensic scientist (born 1924)
  - Sir Owen Woodhouse, naval officer, jurist, President of the Court of Appeal (1981–86) (born 1916)
- 21 April – Maria Olsen, painter and sculptor (born 1947)
- 26 April
  - David Brokenshire, architect, potter (born 1925)
  - Patrick Hanan, Sinology academic (born 1927)

=== May ===
- 8 May – Allan Potts, athlete, athletics coach and administrator (born 1934)
- 10 May – Lane Penn, rugby union player, coach and administrator (born 1938)
- 11 May – Yvonne Cartier, ballet dancer and instructor, mime (born 1928)
- 14 May
  - Morvin Simon, composer, kapa haka leader, academic, historian (born 1944)
  - Warren Sinclair, radiation physicist (born 1924)
- 20 May – Ross Brown, rugby union player (born 1934)
- 21 May
  - Duncan Cole, association football player (born 1958)
  - Mack Herewini, rugby union player (born 1939)
- 22 May – Pani Stirling, educationalist (born 1937)
- 23 May – Sam Harvey, cartoonist (born 1922)
- 28 May – Ethel Divers, netball player (born 1915)
- 30 May – Peter Hall, cricketer (born 1927)

=== June ===
- 9 June – William Bradfield, amateur astronomer (born 1927)
- 12 June – Pat Rosier, writer, editor, feminist activist (born 1942)
- 18 June – Ces Renwick, cricketer (born 1924)
- 21 June – John Heslop, surgeon, cricket administrator (born 1925)
- 30 June – Rik Tau, Ngāi Tahu kaumātua (born 1941)

=== July ===
- 2 July – Dave Feickert, mining safety expert (born 1946)
- 3 July
  - Peter Dawkins, musician and record producer (born 1946)
  - Ramai Hayward, actor and filmmaker (born 1916)
- 5 July – Gugi Waaka, entertainer (born 1937)
- 10 July – Douglas Goodfellow, businessman and philanthropist (born 1917)
- 13 July
  - Con Devitt, trade union leader (born 1928)
  - Josh Liava'a, rugby league player (born 1948)
- 17 July – Ross Burden, model and celebrity chef (born 1968)
- 20 July – Lynda Patterson, Anglican priest (born 1974)
- 21 July – Kevin Skinner, rugby union player (born 1927)
- 22 July – Glenn Jowitt, photographer (born 1955)
- 25 July – Kenneth Ferries, cricketer (born 1936)
- 27 July
  - Eric Anderson, rugby union player and coach (born 1931)
  - Sir Richard Bolt, air force officer (born 1923)
  - Warren Dibble, poet and playwright (born 1931)
- 29 July – Ron Johnston, speedway rider (born 1930)

=== August ===
- 5 August
  - Dave Hereora, politician and trade unionist (born 1956)
  - Joe McManemin, athletics coach, sports administrator, Freemason (born 1923)
- 10 August – Graham Gedye, cricketer (born 1929)
- 13 August – Jack Shallcrass, author, educator, humanist (born 1922)
- 16 August – Kevin Barry, rugby union player (born 1936)
- 19 August – Bob Glading, golfer (born 1920)
- 20 August – Margaret Marks, cricketer (born 1918)
- 22 August – Helen Mason, potter (born 1915)
- 27 August – Frank Corner, diplomat and public servant (born 1920)

=== September ===
- 3 September
  - Dorothy Braxton, journalist (born 1927)
  - Johnny Cooper, rock and roll musician (born 1929)
  - Mark Otway, tennis player (born 1931) (death announced on this date)
- 5 September – Eoin Young, motoring journalist (born 1939)
- 8 September – Errol Clince, hunter, engineer (born 1953)
- 14 September –
  - Peter Gutteridge, musician (born 1961)
  - Charles Littlejohn, parliamentary official (born 1923)
- 22 September – Ben Webb, artist (born 1976)
- 29 September – John Ritchie, composer, music academic (born 1921)

=== October ===
- 3 October – Ewen Gilmour, comedian (born 1963)
- 6 October – Peg Griffin, supercentenarian, oldest person in New Zealand (born 1904)
- 9 October – Connell Thode, naval officer, yachtsman (born 1911)
- 10 October
  - Ivan Armstrong, field hockey player and coach, tennis umpire, educator (born 1928)
  - Jonathan Mane-Wheoki, art historian, academic and curator (born 1943)
  - Ernie Wiggs, rugby league player and coach (born c.1941)
- 13 October – Yvette Bromley, stage actor and theatre director (born 1913)
- 14 October – Bob Neilson, rugby league player (born 1923)
- 18 October – Veandercross, Thoroughbred racehorse (foaled 1988)
- 21 October – Tuna Scanlan, boxer (born 1934)
- 26 October – Sir Tay Wilson, sports administrator (born 1925)
- 27 October – Ian Monro, naval officer (born 1927)

=== November ===
- 2 November – Robert Tripe, actor (born 1973)
- 5 November – Don McLaren, animal healthcare businessman, Thoroughbred racehorse breeder, horse racing administrator (born 1933)
- 6 November – Len Jordan, rugby league player (born 1920)
- 7 November – Rough Habit, Thoroughbred racehorse (foaled 1986)
- 9 November – Jeanne Macaskill, painter (born 1931)
- 14 November – Dave Dephoff, athlete (born 1928)
- 15 November – John Sparnon, rugby league player (born c.1943)
- 16 November – Binney Lock, journalist and newspaper editor (born 1932)
- 17 November – Warren Murdock, cricketer (born 1944)
- 20 November
  - Allan Baker, ornithologist (born 1943)
  - Murray Gittos, fencer (born 1920)
- 24 November – Peter Henderson, rugby union and rugby league player, athlete (born 1926)
- 30 November – Norm Holland, jockey (born 1924)

=== December ===
- 1 December – Rocky Wood, writer (born 1959)
- 3 December – Pat O'Connor, Roman Catholic priest, Ecclesiastical Superior of Tokelau (1992–2011) (born 1932)
- 12 December
  - Graham Turbott, ornithologist and zoologist (born 1914)
  - Alan Ward, historian (born 1935)
- 13 December – John Hickman, meteorologist (born 1927)
- 14 December – John McCraw, soil scientist and local historian (born 1925)
- 16 December – Jack Hazlett, rugby union player, tannery company founder (born 1938)
- 17 December – Leonard Kent, cricketer (born 1924)
- 18 December – John Beedell, canoeist (born 1933)
- 23 December – Nigel Priestley, earthquake engineer (born 1943)
- 25 December
  - Dave Comer, photographer, film location scout (born 1956)
  - Tom O'Donnell, medical doctor, researcher and academic (born 1926)
- 26 December – Judith, Lady Hay, community leader, mayoress of Christchurch (1974–89) (born 1927)
- 29 December – Sir Ivor Richardson, jurist (born 1930)
