= David McKinney =

David McKinney is the name of:

- David McKinney (author) (1945–2014), New Zealand born author
- David McKinney (publisher) (1752–1795), American Presbyterian pastor and publisher
