= Titter =

Titter may refer to:

- Harold Titter, New Zealand businessman and public administrator
- Titter Khel, a village in Pakistan

== See also ==
- Twitter
- Laughter
