= Reihana =

Reihana is both a given name and surname. Notable people with the name include:

== Given name ==
- A. R. Reihana, Indian playback singer and composer
- Reihana Parata (born 1937), New Zealand Māori weaver

== Surname ==
- Bruce Reihana (born 1976), New Zealand rugby union player
- Lisa Reihana (born 1964), New Zealand artist
- Rangimahora Reihana-Mete (1899–1993), New Zealand weaver
- Rivez Reihana (born 2000), New Zealand rugby union player
- Tahi Reihana (born 1970), New Zealand rugby league player
