= Marcel Stanley =

New Zealand philatelist

Marcel Charles Stanley OBE (22 October 1918 – 24 July 1990) was a New Zealand philatelist who was added to the Roll of Distinguished Philatelists in 1971. He was a Fellow of the Royal Philatelic Society of New Zealand.

In the 1990 Queen's Birthday Honours, Stanley was appointed an Officer of the Order of the British Empire, for services to philately.
