= Morehu Flutey-Henare =

New Zealand Māori weaver

- Born: Morehu Greta Flutey; 1952 (age 72–73); New Zealand
- Known for: Weaving

Morehu Greta Flutey-Henare (née Flutey; born 1952), also known as Aunty Morehu, is a New Zealand Māori tohunga raranga (master weaver) from the Ngāi Tahu, Ngāti Kahungunu, Ngāti Porou, Ngāti Māhanga, Ngāti Ruanui and Ngāpuhi iwi.

== Biography ==
Flutey-Henare began weaving as a teenager, making uniforms for kapa haka performers. She lectured in raranga (weaving) at Manukau Institute of Technology, and in 2009 she was appointed a lecturer in raranga at the Christchurch campus of Te Wānanga o Aotearoa. In 2014 Flutey-Henare completed a master’s degree in Indigenous Knowledge Practice, based on raranga, through He Waka Hiringa at Te Wānanga o Aotearoa in Hamilton.

In 2016, Flutey-Henare and Reihana Parata worked together to design woven mats of welcome which were installed using coloured paving stones in the rebuild of the Bridge of Remembrance area in central Christchurch.
