= 1990 Birthday Honours (New Zealand) =

Awards list for New Zealand

The 1990 Queen's Birthday Honours in New Zealand, celebrating the official birthday of Elizabeth II, were appointments made by the Queen in her right as Queen of New Zealand, on the advice of the New Zealand government, to various orders and honours to reward and highlight good works by New Zealanders. They were announced on 16 June 1990.

The recipients of honours are displayed here as they were styled before their new honour.

== Knight Bachelor ==
- (Humphrey) Michael Gerard Fay – of Auckland. For services to merchant banking and yachting.
- Richard John Hadlee MBE – of Christchurch. For services to cricket.
- Howard Leslie Morrison OBE – of Rotorua. For services to entertainment.
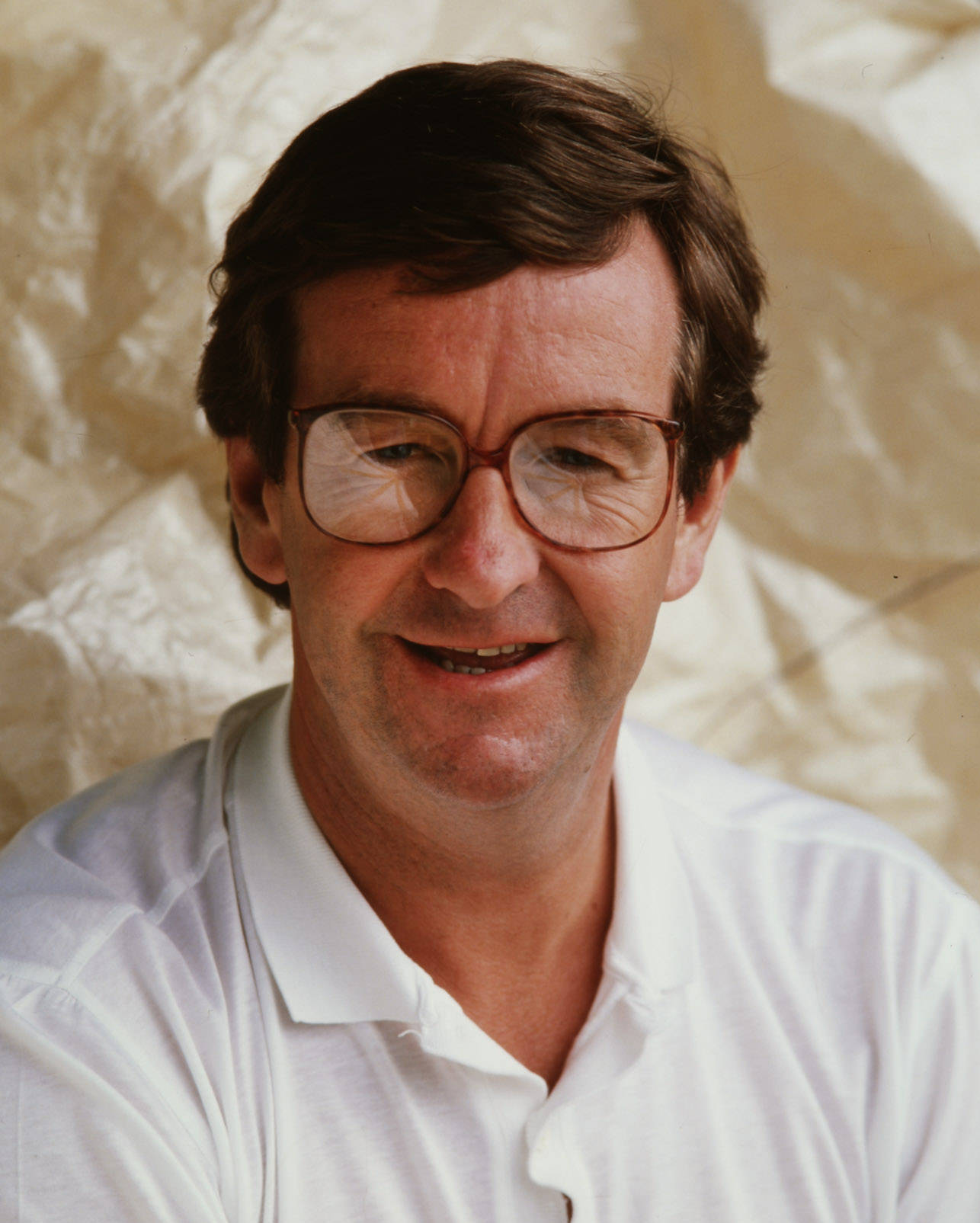
Sir Michael Fay

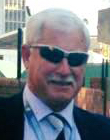
Sir Richard Hadlee

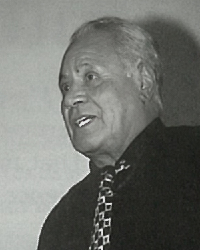
Sir Howard Morrison

== Order of the Bath ==
=== Companion (CB) ===
Military division

- Air Vice-Marshal Peter Raymond Adamson OBE – Chief of Air Staff, Royal New Zealand Air Force.

== Order of Saint Michael and Saint George ==
=== Companion (CMG) ===
- Professor Emeritus Eric William Herd – of Dunedin. For services to linguistics and the community.
- Harold Mervyn Titter – of Auckland. For services to business management and the community.
- Hohua Taharangi Te Matehapara Tutengaehe – of Christchurch. For services to the Māori people and community.

== Royal Victorian Order ==
=== Member (MVO) ===
- Richard Donald Sweetzer – executive officer, Government House.

== Order of the British Empire ==
=== Dame Commander (DBE) ===
Civil division

- Dorothy Gertrude Winstone CMG – of Auckland. For services to the community.

=== Knight Commander (KBE) ===
Military division

- Lieutenant General John Airth Mace CB OBE – Chief of Defence Staff.

=== Commander (CBE) ===
Civil division

- Dr Colin Campbell Aikman – of Petone. For services to law and education.
- Dr Edmund Peter Allen MBE – of New Plymouth. For services to medicine and the community.
- Arthur William Barnett MC – of Dunedin. For services to the community.
- Professor David Simpson Cole – of Auckland. For services to medicine.
- The Honourable Colin James Moyle MP – of Ōhaeawai. For public services.
- Dr Pita (Peter) Russell Sharples JP – of Auckland. For services to the Māori people.
- Professor Terence Laurie Sturm – of Auckland. For services to literature.
- The Right Reverend Peter Eves Sutton – of Nelson; Bishop of Nelson.
- Beverley Anne Wakem – of Wellington. For services to broadcasting and the community.
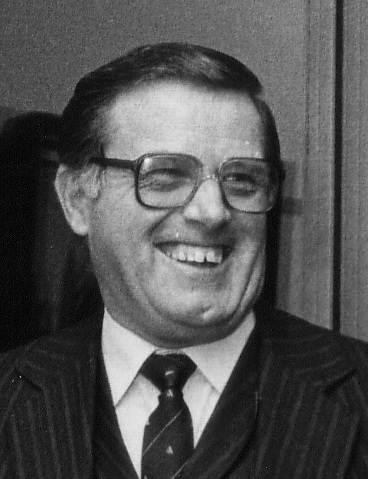
Colin Moyle

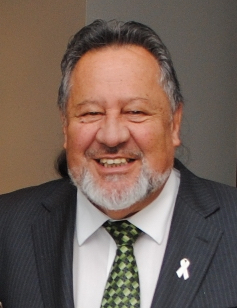
Pita Sharples

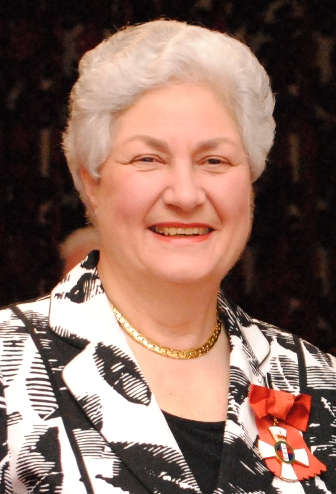
Beverley Wakem

=== Officer (OBE) ===
Civil division

- Dr Colin Bassett – of Wellington. For services to forest science.
- Gilbert William Beale – of Christchurch. For services to the community.
- Ian Gordon Edward Coddington MVO – of Silverstream; lately chief traffic superintendent, Ministry of Transport.
- Bruce Kenneth Farr – of Annapolis, Maryland, United States. For services to yacht design.
- lan Geoffrey Fraser – of Wellington. For public services.
- Kiwa Hone Taiapoapo Te Ngarue Graham – of Hamilton. For services to the Māori people and the community.
- Frank Haydn Haigh – of Auckland. For services to the community.
- Brian Fenton Hyland QFSM – of Wellington; fire commissioner, New Zealand Fire Service.
- Samuel Patrick Jennings – of Wellington. For services to the maritime industry and trade-union affairs.
- Ronald Cecil Joyce – assistant commissioner, New Zealand Police.
- John King – of Feilding. For services to local-body and community affairs.
- Robin Anthony McKenzie – of Waikanae. For services to physiotherapy.
- Ismalia Jane Davenport Manahi – of Woodend. For services to the community.
- William John Mumm JP – of Ngakawau. For services to local government.
- Mirek (Miroslav) Smíšek – of Te Horo. For services to pottery.
- Dorothy Jessie Stafford – of Nelson. For services to education.
- Marcel Charles Stanley – of Waikanae. For services to philately.
- Robert Campbell Whyte – of Wellington. For services to the maritime industry.

Military division

- Lieutenant Colonel (now Colonel) John Arthur Fisher – Royal New Zealand Infantry Regiment.
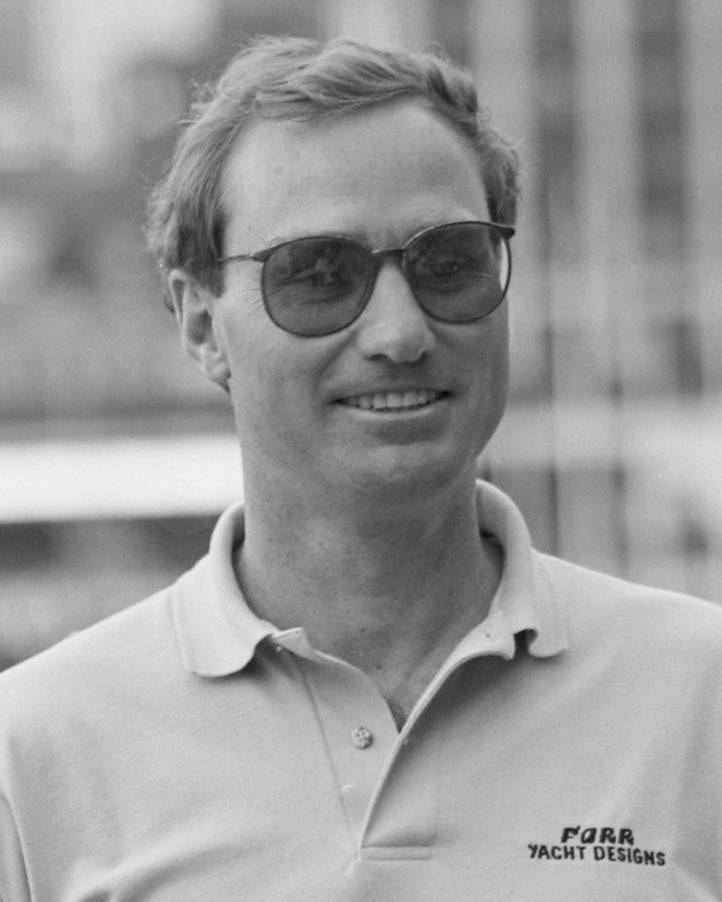
Bruce Farr

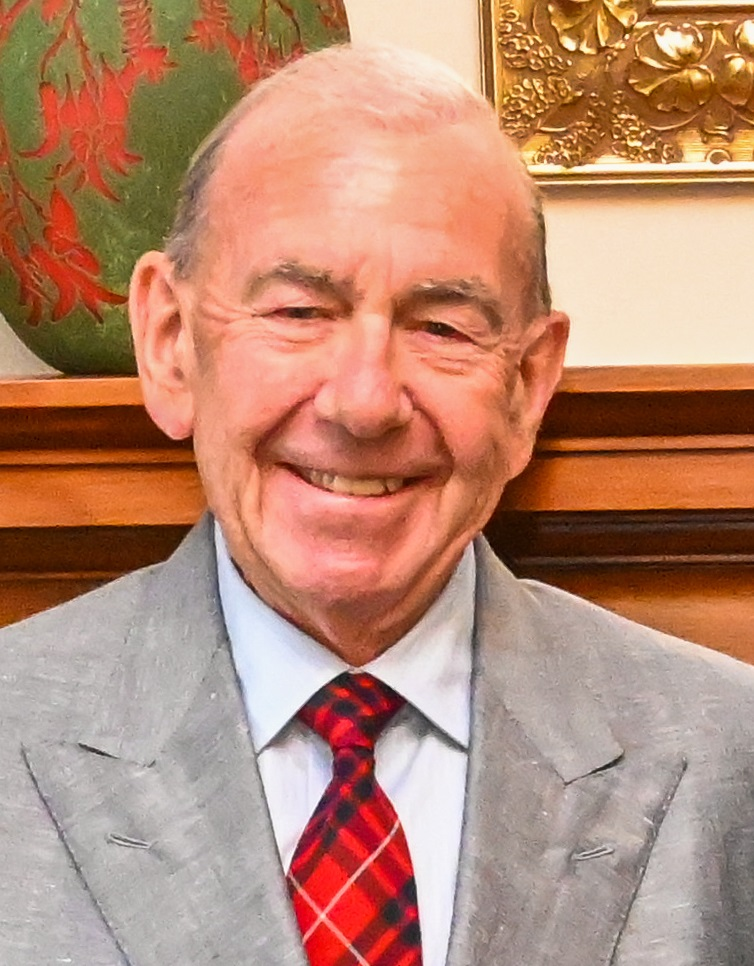
Ian Fraser

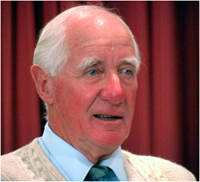
Robin McKenzie

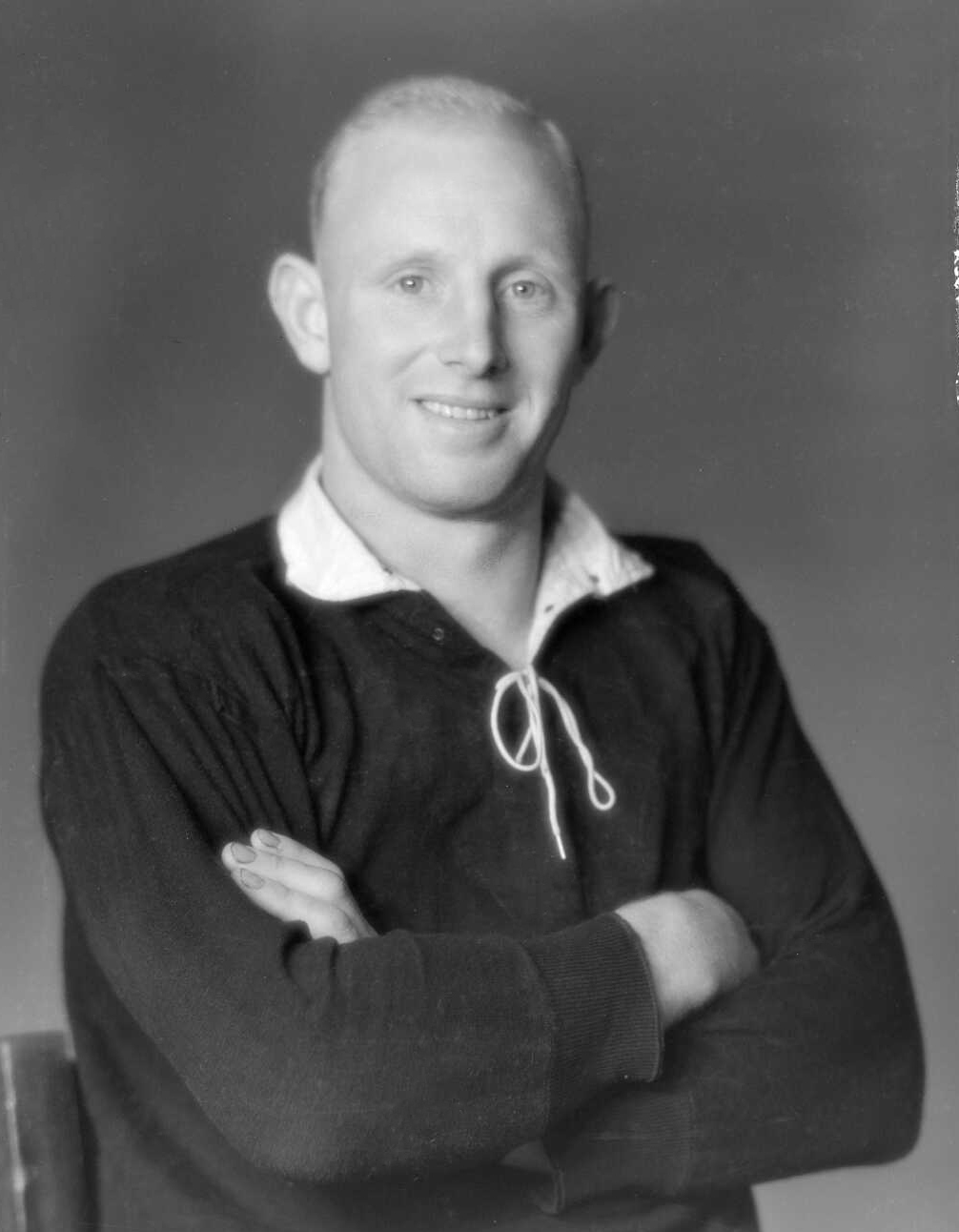
Bill Mumm

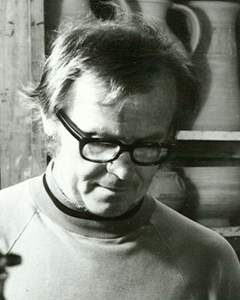
Mirek Smíšek

=== Member (MBE) ===
Civil division

- Gary John Anderson – of Wanganui. For services to cycling.
- Roger Brian Blackburn – of Oamaru. For services to the community.
- Sydney Joseph Bradley – of Christchurch; regional manager, South Island, New Zealand Post Ltd.
- Barry James Eric Brailsford – of Christchurch. For services to education.
- John Logan Brewer – of Auckland. For services to film and television design.
- John Llewellyn Davies – of Auckland. For services to athletics.
- Peter Bruce Davison – of Auckland. For services to bowls.
- Melvyn Ewell Foster – of Lyttelton. For services to local government and the community.
- Kenneth Francis Gray – of Plimmerton. For services to local-body affairs.
- Leonard Keith Grey – of Gisborne. For services to horticulture.
- Madonna Harris – of Utah, United States. For services to cycling.
- Elric James Hooper – of Christchurch. For services to drama and the theatre.
- Lyn Patricia Johnston – of Auckland. For services to gymnastics.
- Malcolm Harry Kemp – of Auckland. For services to television.
- Millie Cecelia Khan – of Matamata. For services to bowls.
- Paul James Kingsman – of Auckland. For services to swimming.
- George Menzies Nicol – of Dunedin. For services to trade-union affairs.
- Stephen Francis Nolan JP – of Whataroa. For services to the community.
- Mere Matekino Palmer – of Tauranga. For services to kōhanga reo.
- Michael Charles Payne – of Wanganui. For services to the community.
- Nancye Elisabeth Seaton – of Wellington. For services to the performing arts.
- Stanley Sharpe JP – of Dunedin. For services to conservation.
- Edwin Neville Sims – of Dunedin. For services to engineering.

Military division

- Warrant Officer Clifford Stephen Antony Heywood – Royal New Zealand Navy (Retired).
- Captain Peter Arie Bos – Royal New Zealand Infantry Regiment (Territorial Force).
- Warrant Officer Class One Henry James Macown – Royal Regiment of New Zealand Artillery (Retired).
- Captain John Michael Richardson – Royal New Zealand Infantry Regiment.
- Flight Lieutenant Christopher John Lamain – Royal New Zealand Air Force.
- Warrant Officer Lawrence Walter Taogaga – Royal New Zealand Air Force.
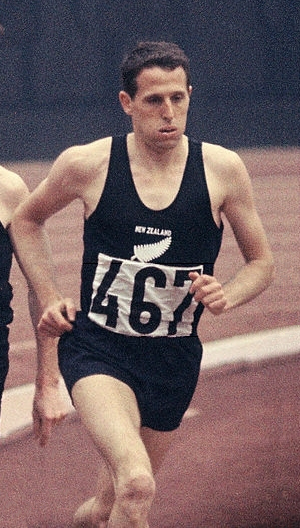
John Davies

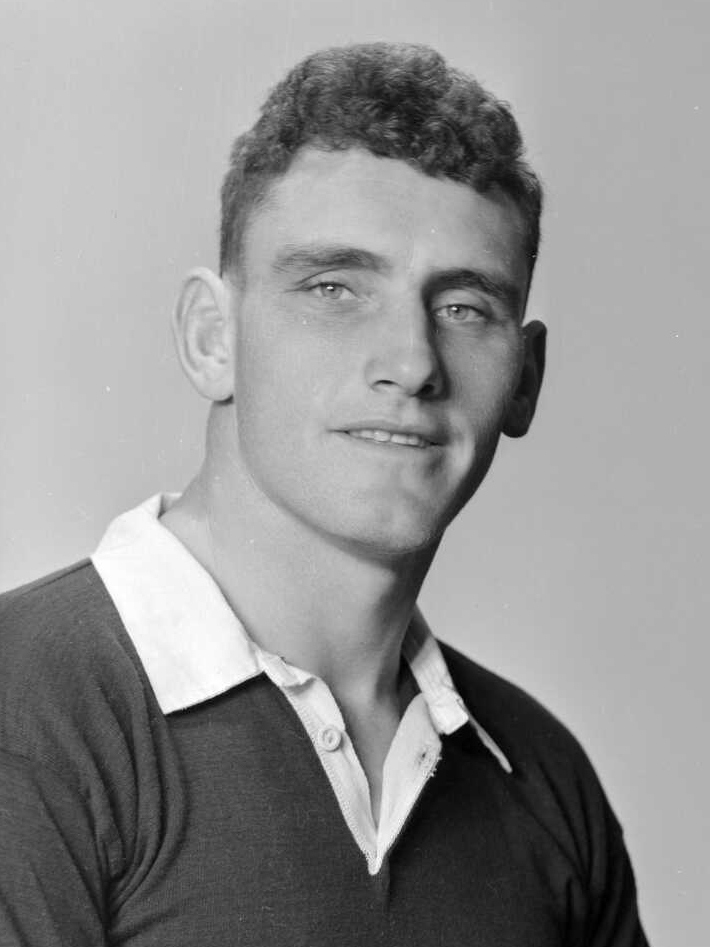
Ken Gray

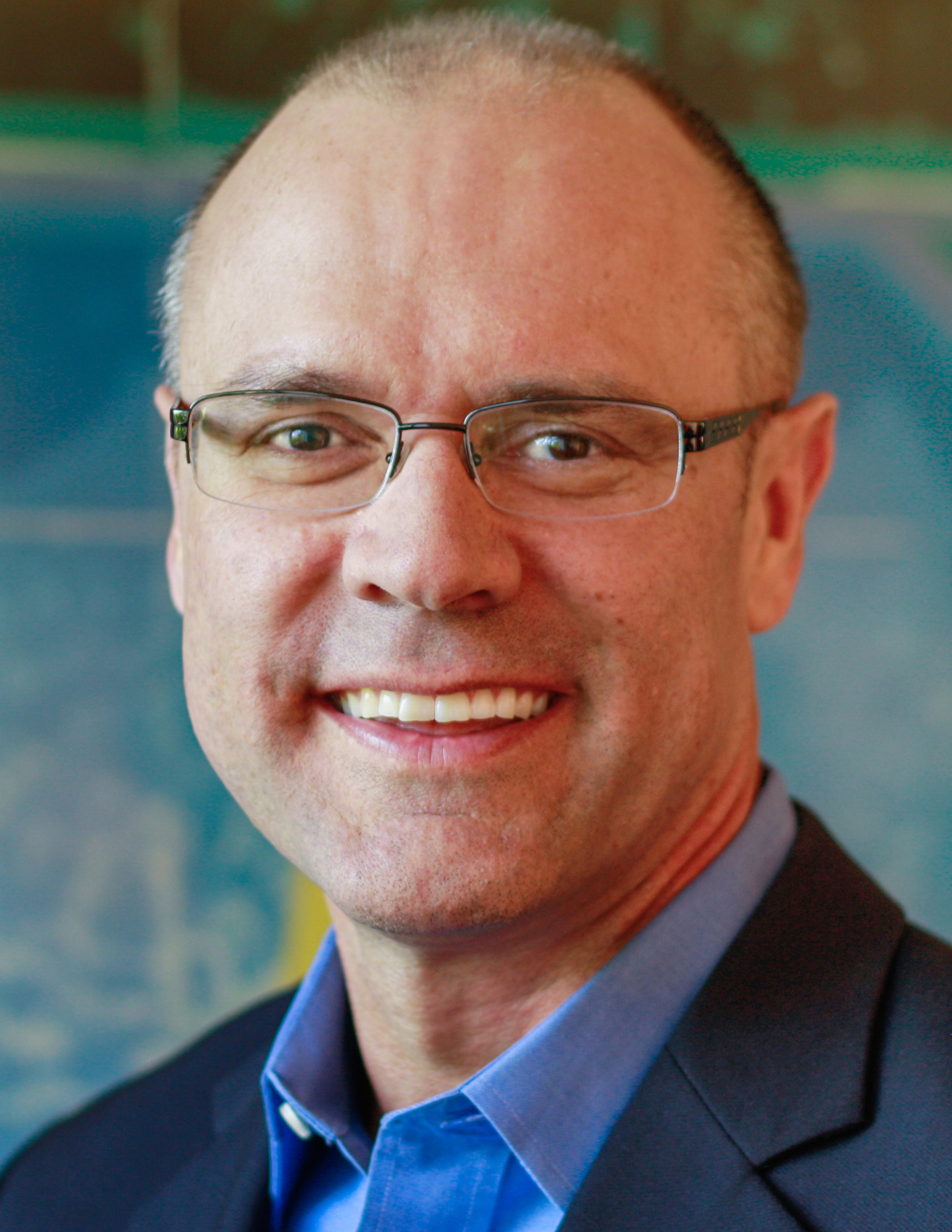
Paul Kingsman

== British Empire Medal (BEM) ==
Military division

- Chief Petty Officer Frederick Donnelly – Royal New Zealand Navy.
- Staff Sergeant Gary Rossmore Nicol – Corps of Royal New Zealand Engineers.

== Companion of the Queen's Service Order (QSO) ==
=== For community service ===
- Georgina (Gina) Dorothy Campbell-Jensen – of Frederiksberg, Denmark.
- Yshbel Agnes Glass – of Albury.
- George John Griffiths – of Dunedin.
- Otene Sonny (Hooki) Makene – of Whangārei.
- Stella Caroline Isabel Rolls – of Nelson.
- Gwendoline Elsie Ryan – of Wellington.

=== For public services ===
- Anthony Covic – of Auckland.
- Dr Elspeth Jean Bruce Kjestrup – of Hamilton.
- Dr Gerard David McSweeney – of South Westland.
- Deirdre Glenna Milne – of Auckland.
- Michael John Minogue – of Hamilton.
- Ian Kahurangi Mitchell JP – of Auckland.
- Paraone Brown Reweti – of Tauranga.
- Kenneth Lionel Richardson – of Wellington; principal private secretary to the Prime Minister.
- Olive Evelyn Smuts-Kennedy – of Wellington.
- Sir Alan Towers Traill GBE – of Surrey, United Kingdom.
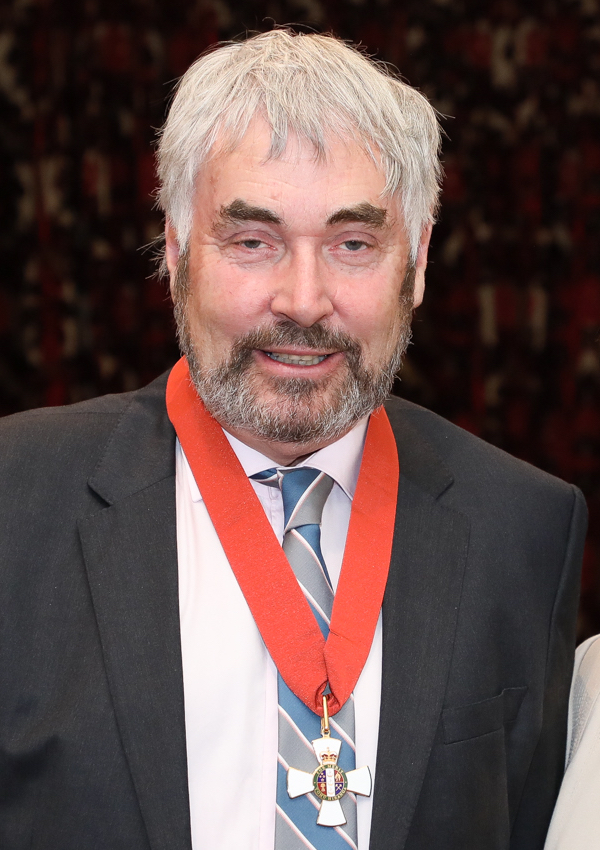
Gerry McSweeney

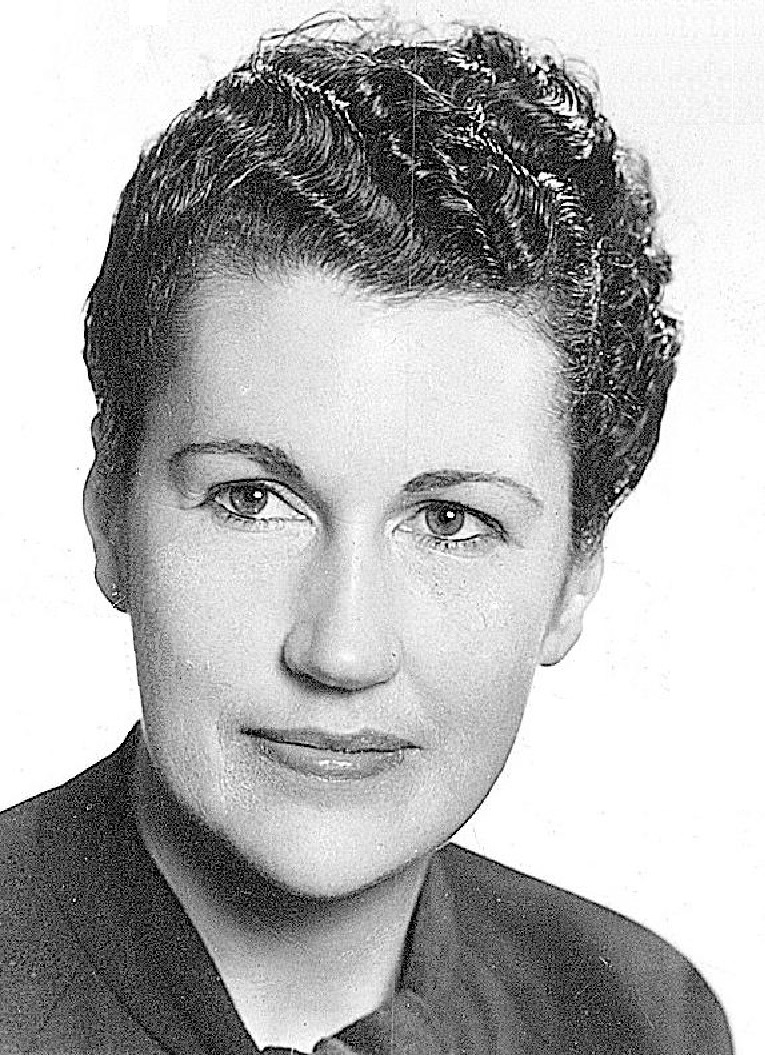
Olive Smuts-Kennedy

== Queen's Service Medal (QSM) ==
=== For community service ===
- Eleanor Jean Bomholt – of Bagsværd, Denmark.
- Freda Daphne Browne – of Temuka.
- John Kendall Chapman – of Orewa.
- Cornelius (Neil) Adrian Collins – of Dunedin.
- Ruby Olive Corbet – of Tauranga.
- Kevin Samuel Crowther – of Auckland.
- Patrick Joseph Dugan – of Christchurch.
- Jack Edward Ede – of Christchurch.
- Andrew Thompson Galloway – of Hamilton.
- Joan Margaret (Penny) Giddens – of Christchurch.
- The Reverend Wi Hamutana – of Hastings.
- Edna Mary Hanafin – of Christchurch.
- Rowan Lewis Hatch – of Wellington.
- Raymond Laurence Heath – of Lower Hutt.
- Diana, Lady Isaac – of Christchurch.
- Tepare Kavana – of Auckland.
- Thomas Charles Libby – of Clive.
- John Hamilton Malcolm JP – of Auckland.
- Sydia Karewa Marsh – of Kaikohe.
- John Percival Mellor – of Wolverhampton, England.
- Annie Mia Moore – of Rotorua.
- Hugh Douglas Moss – of New Plymouth.
- Cylvia Fay Muncaster – of Auckland.
- Malcolm Gordon Frank Myers JP – of Auckland.
- Annie Ida (Tot) Pannell – of Christchurch.
- Frederick Robert Paterson – of Nelson.
- Jeanie York Paton – of Christchurch.
- John Bane Riddell – of Auckland.
- Murdoch Francis Rogers – of Christchurch.
- Joan Frances Saunders – of Auckland.
- Satendra Kumar Singh JP – of Auckland.
- Bim Vivienne Mary Skudder – of Upper Hutt.
- Annie Sinclair Smith – of Levin.
- Walter Edward James Stevenson – of Auckland.
- Harold Sutherland – of Christchurch.
- Pamela Cherrington Sutton JP – of Nelson.
- Bhadrabala Bell Thompson JP – of Lower Hutt.
- Marjorie Whalley – of Whakatāne.
- Pamela Dayrell Whittington JP – of Wellington.
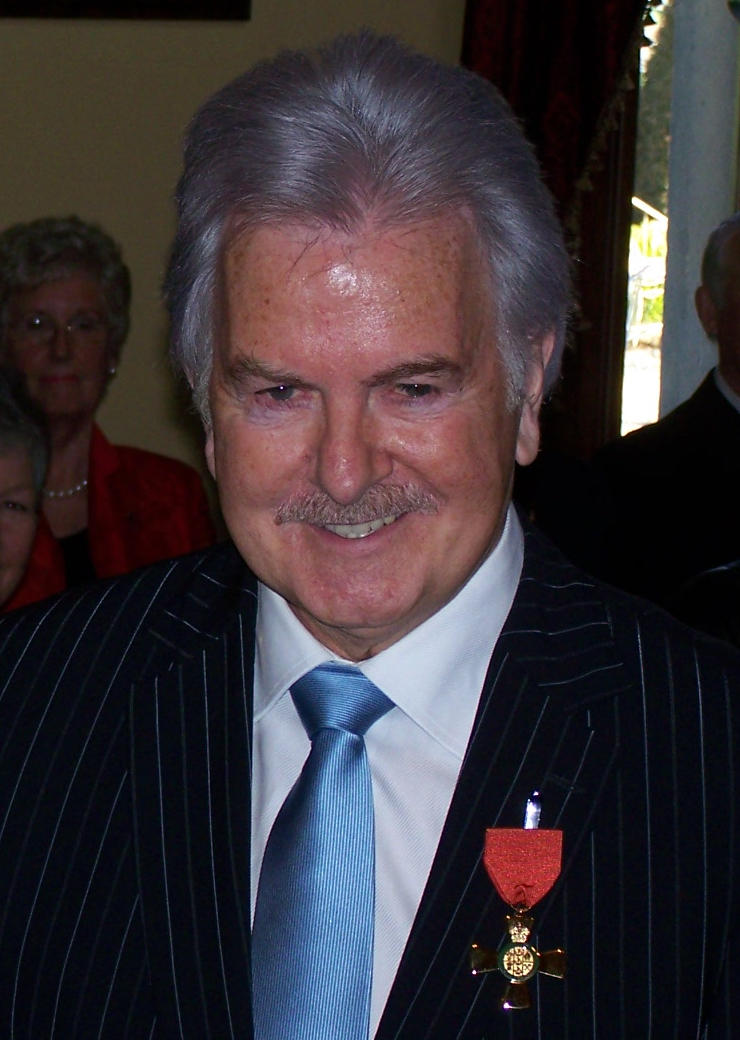
Neil Collins

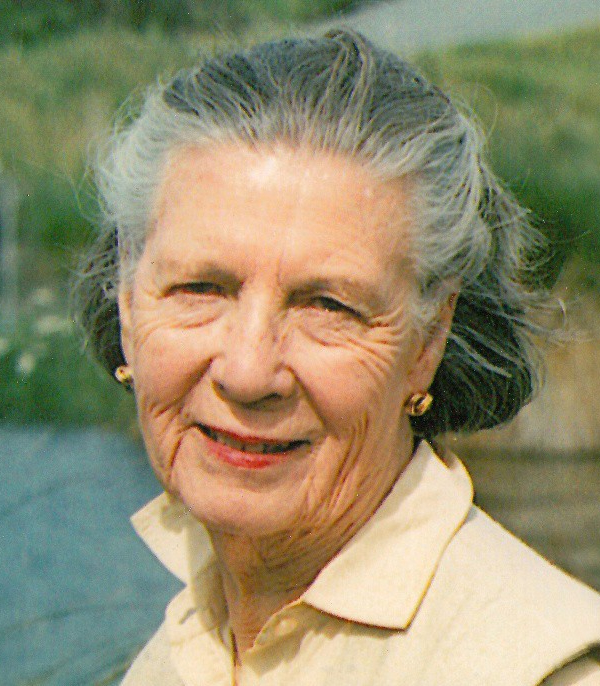
Diana, Lady Isaac

=== For public services ===
- Roy Stanley Amor – of Wellington.
- Derek Alan Angus MP – of Winton.
- Kenneth David Arthur Ball – of Auckland.
- Joseph Peter Bleakley – of Wellington.
- Anna Maria Josephina Coleta Bogers – of Riversdale.
- Harata Charlotte Cash – of Auckland.
- Timothy Angus Chisholm – of Toronto, Ontario, Canada.
- Reginald Charles Clapp – of Auckland.
- Lucy Ann Cole JP – of Lower Hutt.
- Patricia Conway – of New York City, United States.
- Jean Marjorie Dellaca – of Westport.
- Margaret Ward Donnelly – of Foxton.
- William George Emerson – of Upper Hutt.
- Bettie-Anne Gleadow – of Nelson.
- Brian Gundesen – senior constable, New Zealand Police.
- Doreen Alethea Kellett – of Auckland.
- Thora Winifred King – of Hokitika.
- Lindsay Wayne Laird – of Auckland.
- Kathleen Daphne May Landrekin – of Wairoa.
- Monica Frances Landy (Sister Monica) – of Masterton.
- Michael Robert Leggott – of Upper Hutt.
- Nonu Tuisamoa Le Laulu JP – of Auckland.
- (Elizabeth) Ann Mallinson – of Wellington.
- Margaret Beatrice Mowbray – of Hamilton.
- Farwin Nemaia – of Auckland.
- Rena Rauputiputi Ngataki – of Ngāruawāhia.
- Mary Jane O'Reilly – of Auckland.
- Reihana Parata – of Lyttelton.
- Doris Mary Paterson – of Auckland.
- Barry Edwin Rowe – of Leigh.
- Dr Cleveland Latimer Edward Lilly Sheppard ED – of Christchurch.
- Ropati Joseph Simona – of Auckland.
- Robert Allan Stevens – of New Plymouth.
- Valerie Anne Stuart – of Kaiteretere.
- Robert Edward Taylor – of Wainuiomata.
- Barry Graham Thomson – senior constable, New Zealand Police.
- Robin Alfred Whittle – of Napier.
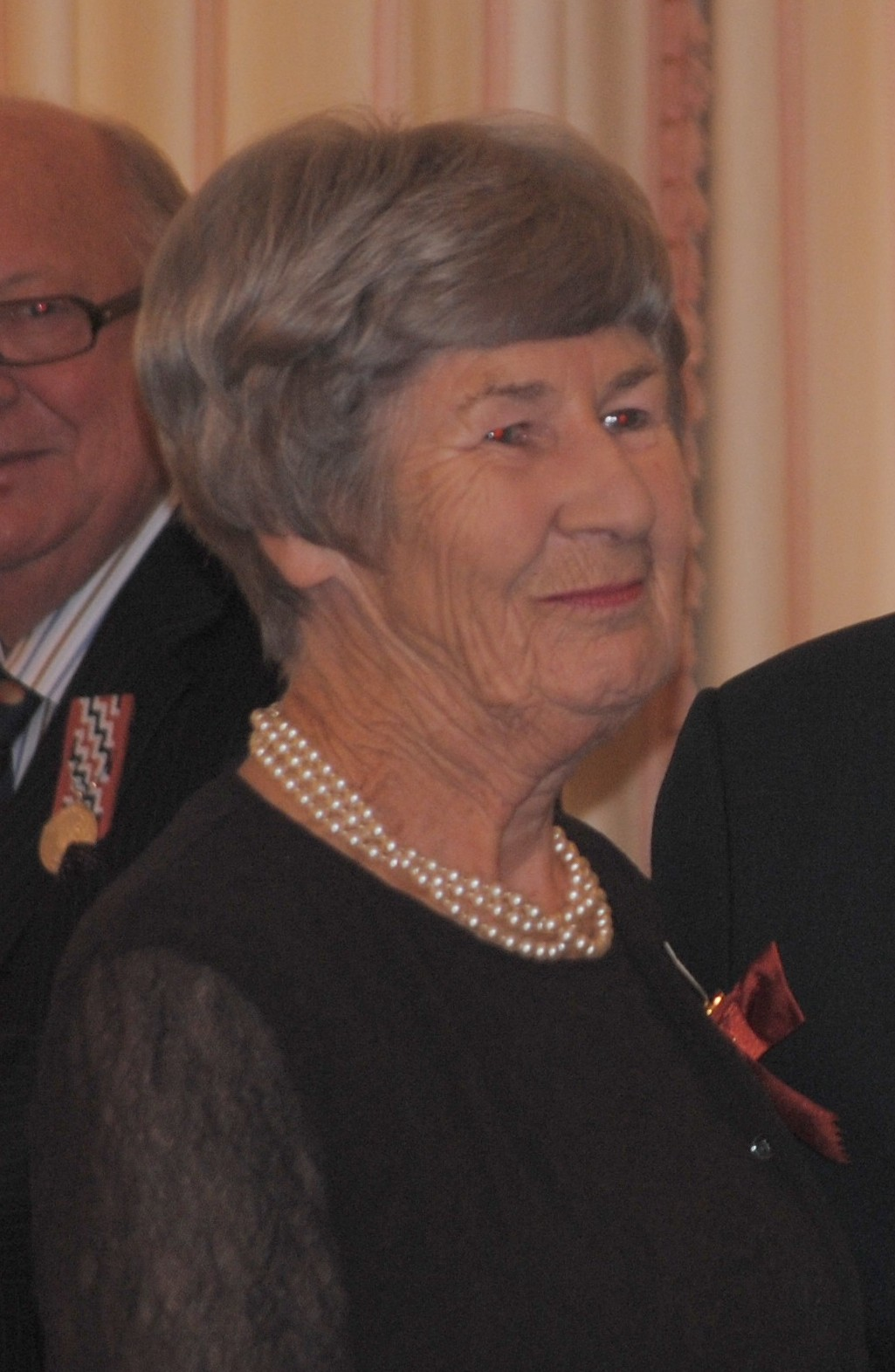
Ann Mallinson

== Queen's Fire Service Medal (QFSM) ==
- Kevin William Adie – station officer, Hawke's Bay Fire Brigade, New Zealand Fire Service.
- Noel William Miles – chief fire officer, Fairlie Volunteer Fire Brigade, New Zealand Fire Service.
- Archibald Barry Radovan – assistant commander, Auckland 1 A Region, New Zealand Fire Service.
- Garry Richard Stanley – chief fire officer, Matamata Volunteer Fire Brigade, New Zealand Fire Service.

== Queen's Police Medal (QPM) ==
- James Butterworth – inspector, New Zealand Police.

== Air Force Cross (AFC) ==
- Flight Lieutenant (now Squadron Leader) Herbert Bruce Keightley – Royal New Zealand Air Force.

== Air Force Medal (AFM) ==
- Flight Sergeant David Jobson – Royal New Zealand Air Force.

== Queen's Commendation for Valuable Service in the Air ==
- Flying Officer Cameron Smith – Royal New Zealand Air Force.
