= Errol Clince =

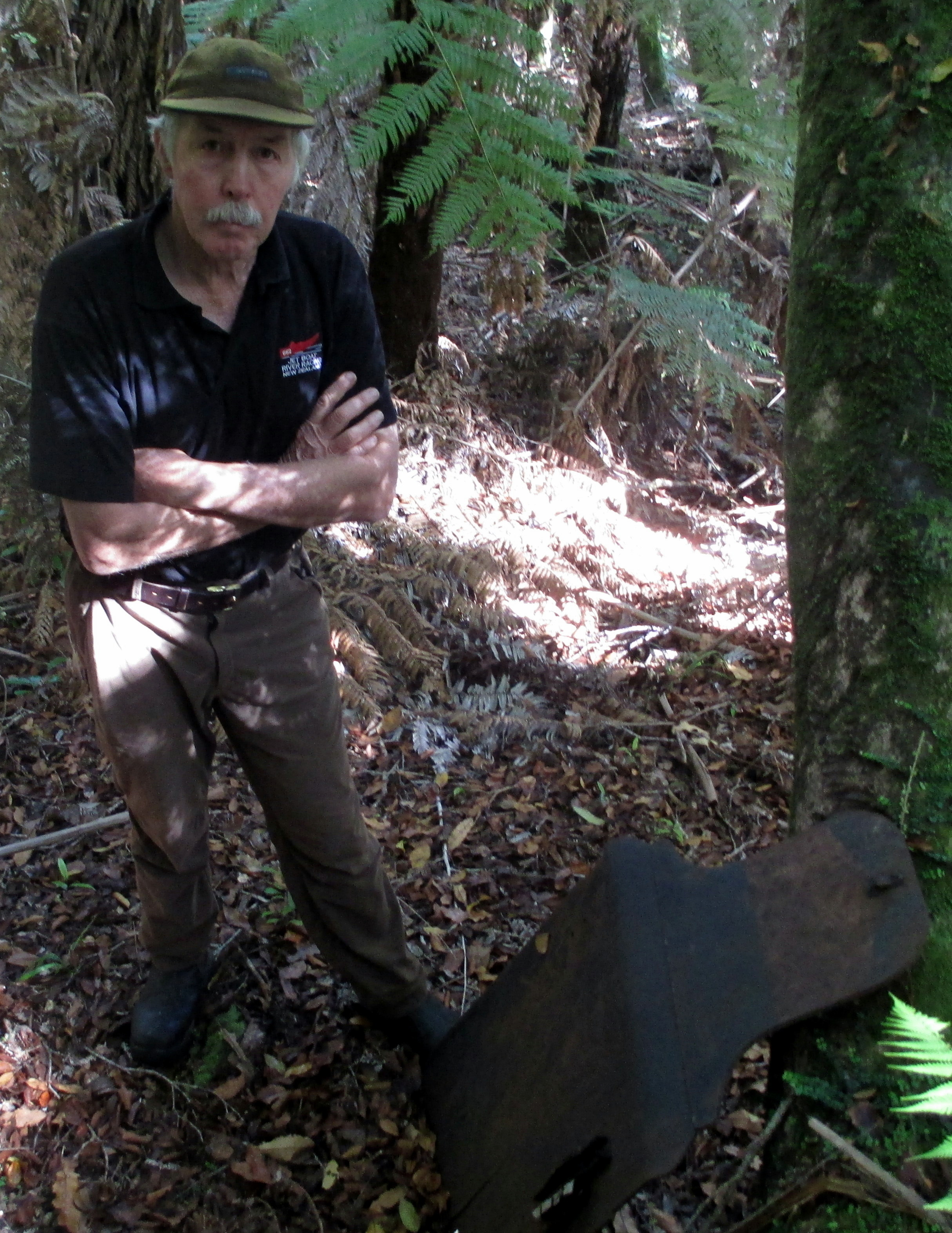
Clince poses next to a piece of wreckage from a P-51 Mustang that crashed in Taranaki.

Errol Clince (16 February 1953 – 8 September 2014) was a New Zealand professional hunter and self-taught engineer. He is most well known for his discovery of the wreckage of a Royal New Zealand Air Force Airspeed Oxford, ending a 32-year New Zealand aviation mystery.

Clince was born in 1953 in Eltham, Taranaki. A keen hunter from an early age, he left Stratford High School aged 18 and took a job with the New Zealand Forest Service as a pest controller. He was tasked with hunting goats on Mount Taranaki (then Mount Egmont) and the surrounding National Park. He also had a stint as an exterminator on Raoul Island. He has been credited with over 5000 confirmed kills over his 16-year career as a professional hunter. An expert on both the local geography and animal pests, Clince assisted with various technical reports and academic studies relating to the area. Following his work with the NZ Forest Service, he worked as a caretaker for the Stratford Mountain House on the eastern slopes of Mount Taranaki.

Clince is most well-known for the discovery of an RNZAF Airspeed Oxford twin engine bomber-training aircraft wreckage on the slopes of Mount Taranaki. The aircraft, an Oxford I, NZ277/P2030 with Pilot Officer Rodney Dandy, Crew Sergeant Douglas Martyn, Sergeant Graham Martin, and Sergeant Edward Dodson, departed Bell Block Airfield near New Plymouth on 23 October 1942 on a training mission. It is assumed that due to heavy clouds, the crew made navigational errors which resulted in a crash at 4,000 ft (1,200 m). No crew members survived. The RNZAF and local authorities discontinued searches for the aircraft after three months.

Clince discovered the crash site 32 years later, on 15 January 1974. Assuming it had already been documented, he messed around with the wreckage, including tampering with the controls and .303 machine gun. He was alerted to the presence of human remains by his dog, who had recovered a bone. He then made a hasty retreat down the mountain to inform the police. He soon returned with a party of Police, NZRAF and media. His diary noted:

Hunted Mangorei Stream, got 10 goats. Got a ride in a Cortina 2000 Automatic. Found old bomber below Mangorei Hut somewhere. There were a lot of 303 bullet shells, a machinegun and an old parachute still not undone ... I also found the leg bone of a human then I buggered off from there fast.

Clince was also well-known locally for his engineering projects. He forged numerous black-powder cannons, which were often wheeled out at local events, and for building two gyro-copters in which he clocked over 300 flying-hours over Taranaki and Manawatū-Whanganui Regions.

Clince died on 8 September 2014 after a short battle with cancer.
