= Elric Hooper =

New Zealand actor, artistic director and drama teacher

Elric James Hooper MBE (born 1936) is a New Zealand director and actor. He was the artistic director of the Court Theatre in Christchurch from 1979 to 2000.

== Education ==
Hooper was educated at Wharenui Primary School, followed by Christchurch Boys' High School from 1949 to 1953.

== Honours and awards ==
In the 1990 Queens Birthday Honours, Hooper was appointed a Member of the Order of the British Empire, for services to drama and the theatre. Also in 1990 he was awarded the New Zealand 1990 Commemoration Medal.

Hooper was conferred with an honorary Doctor of Letters degree by the University of Canterbury in 2001.
