= Gary Giles =

New Zealand cricketer

Personal information
- Born: 12 January 1940; Hamilton, New Zealand
- Died: 5 February 2014 (aged 74); Hamilton, New Zealand
- Source: Cricinfo, 16 May 2016

Gary Giles (12 January 1940 – 5 February 2014) was a New Zealand cricketer. He played 25 first-class matches for Northern Districts between 1961 and 1976. In the 1965/66 season, he earned a call-up to the New Zealand team and was 12th man for a Test match against the touring England side.
