= Robert Tripe =

New Zealand actor

Robbie Tripe
- Born: Robert John Rostrevor Tripe; 12 July 1973; Whanganui, New Zealand
- Died: 2 November 2014 (aged 41); Auckland, New Zealand
- Education: Huntley School; Wanganui Collegiate School; Toi Whakaari
- Occupation: Actor
- Years active: 1999–2014

Robert John Rostrevor "Robbie" Tripe (12 July 1973 – 2 November 2014) was a New Zealand stage, television and movie actor.

== Biography ==
=== Background and Education ===
Born in Whanganui in 1973, Tripe was educated at Huntley School in Marton and Wanganui Collegiate School. He later studied acting at Toi Whakaari: NZ Drama School, from where he graduated with a Bachelor of Performing Arts (Acting) in 1999.

=== Career ===
Tripe appeared on stage in theatrical productions at many venues across New Zealand, and was twice nominated for best supporting actor in the Chapman Tripp Theatre Awards, first for his portrayal of Peter Trofimov in The Cherry Orchard at Circa Theatre in 2005, and then for Bernard in Death of a Salesman the following year, also at Circa. He also appeared in productions of Noël & Gertie at the Tabard Theatre in London, and Te Aurarua at Théâtre des Trois Chênes in Le Quesnoy. According to Jennifer Ward-Lealand, Tripe's theatrical highlight was in the role of Daniel in the BATS Theatre production of Katydid in 2010.

Tripe's best-known television role was as lawyer Lawrence Cunningham in the New Zealand soap opera Shortland Street. He also appeared in The Strip and Power Rangers. On the big screen, his credits included The Truth About Demons (2000), The Last Great Snail Chase (2007), and 3 Mile Limit (2014).

=== Other ===
Tripe served for a time as vice-president of the actors' union, Equity New Zealand.

Tripe died in Auckland on 2 November 2014.
