= Titter Khel =

Village in Khyber Pakhtunkhwa, Pakistan

Coordinates: 32.4476°N 70.7564°E

Titter Khel is a village of Lakki Marwat District, Khyber Pakhtunkhwa, Pakistan. It is also known as Tattar Khel and as Umar Titter Khel.

== Location ==
It is located on Dera Bannu Road, N 55 Highway, about 30 km from Lakki Marwat City.

== Education ==
1) Govt high school for boys. 2) Govt Higher secondary school for Girls. 3) 5 Govt primary schools for boys and two for girls.

== Language ==
The people of Titter Khel speak Pashto, but the national language Urdu is also spoken. There are some good English speakers.
