= Bell Block Aerodrome =

Former airstrip in New Plymouth, New Zealand

Bell Block was the original site of New Plymouth Airport.

== History ==
Opened in 1933 with five grass landing strips, the main strip 5000 ft long. Union Airways operated its main trunk De Havilland Express airliners into the airport. A large hangar and maintenance facilities were built for the Union Airways use.

During World War II, the RNZAF commandeered the airport as RNZAF Base Bell Block. After the war, the airport was returned to civilian ownership.

Government airline New Zealand National Airways Corporation continued to use the maintenance facilities after Union Airways were absorbed into the nationalised airline. Lockheed Lodestar and Douglas DC-3 Skyliner airliners were the main form of transport to use the airport.

As aviation developed and airliners grew larger, Bell Block became too restricted for modern airliners due to its undulating grass runways and restrictive approach terrain. NZNAC wanted to introduce their new Fokker Friendship onto provincial routes and retire its ageing DC-3s, which would require a paved main runway.

New Plymouth City Council decided to build a new paved runway and terminal at the end of Brown Road, which was completed in 1966.

Bell Block was closed and turned into a light industrial and warehousing estate. The large maintenance hangars still stand within the estate.
