= Reihana Parata =

New Zealand Māori weaver

Reihana Parata QSM
- Born: 1937 (age 88–89); New Zealand
- Known for: Weaving

Reihana Parata QSM (born 1937; also known as Aunty Doe) is a New Zealand Māori tohunga raranga (master weaver) from the Ngāi Tahu iwi. For 11 years Parata was matron at the Te Waipounamu Māori Girls' College in Christchurch.

== Biography ==
Parata grew up in Lyttelton, near Christchurch, New Zealand, and attended Lyttelton West Primary School where she first started weaving.

In 1978, she was appointed matron at Te Waipounamu Māori Girls' College Christchurch, a position she held for 11 years. The focus of the college was on providing an education for Māori girls. While there, weaver Emily Schuster visited the college to teach the students weaving skills and Parata learnt alongside them.

Parata is a member of the Te Roopu Raranga Whatu o Aotearoa (National Collective of Māori Weavers in New Zealand). In 2008 Parata gained formal acknowledgement of her master weaver status in Aotearoa by being appointed to Te Kāhui Whiritoi by the management committee of Te Roopu Raranga Whatu and the New Zealand Māori Arts and Crafts Institute at Te Puia.

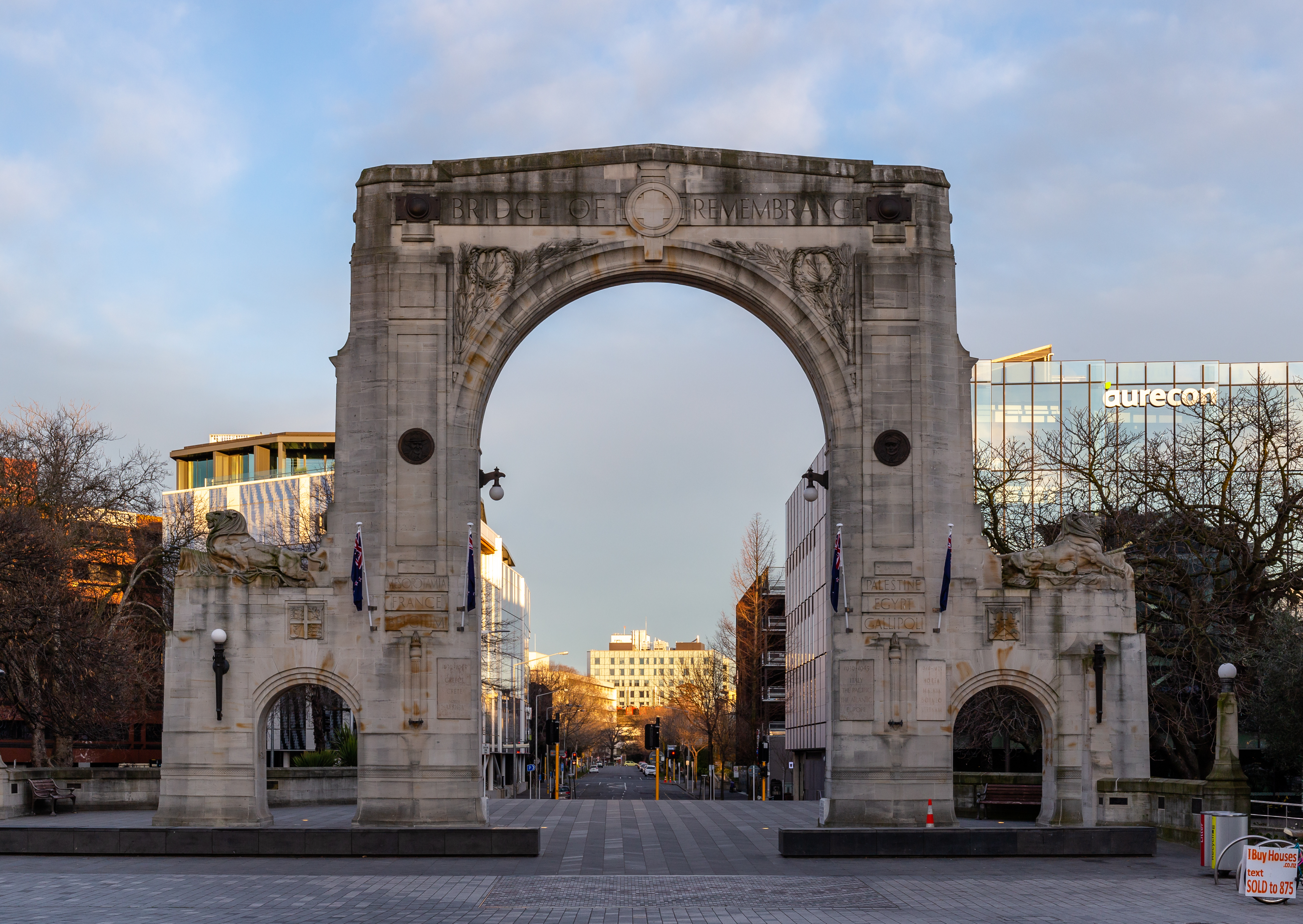
Bridge of Remembrance with the mat of welcome designed by Parata and Flutey-Henare

In 2016, Parata and Morehu Flutey-Henare worked together to design woven mats of welcome which were installed using coloured paving stones in the rebuild of the Bridge of Remembrance area in central Christchurch.

=== Recognition ===
In the 1990 Birthday Honours list, Parata was awarded the Queen's Service Medal for public services, in recognition of her services to weaving.

== Works ==
Collaborations:

- Kahu Poa (collection of Korowai Tahi)
- Nga Here o Te Ao (collection of Te Roopu Raranga Whatu o Aotearoa)
