= Glenn Jowitt =

New Zealand photographer (1955–2014)

Glenn Nigel Jowitt (1955 – 22 July 2014) was a New Zealand photographer who specialised in the people and cultures of the Pacific Islands and the communities of Pacific Island descent in New Zealand. He published more than 70 books and booklets throughout his career, including Pacific Images in 1987, Pacific Island Style in 1999, Feasts and Festivals in 2002, and Pacific Pattern in 2005.

== Biography ==
Jowitt was born to Adam and Margaret Jowitt in Upper Hutt, New Zealand, in 1955. He enrolled at the Ilam School of Fine Arts in Christchurch during the late 1970s, where he studied art and design. Jowitt photographed a series on the horse racing industry for his college honours projects. His racing series were later published as Race Day by Collins Publishers.

In 1980, Jowitt travelled the United States on an educational trip which would spark his interest in cultural photography. Jowitt met Ruth Lester, a former editor for Life magazine, while visiting the International Center of Photography in New York City. Lester looked at Jowitt's photographs and noticed the number of Pacific Islander immigrants featured in his pictures, which had been taken in the vicinity of Karangahape Road and Queen Street in Auckland. She believed that the Pacific community would reshape the cultural life of Auckland, similar to how Hispanic growth had changed the face of New York City.

Jowitt returned to Auckland, where he focused on documenting the Pacific Island communities in the city's Grey Lynn and Ponsonby neighbourhoods through photography. His contacts led to opportunities to visit Polynesia. In 1981, he embarked on a six-month-long photography trip to Niue, Tonga, Samoa, Tokelau, and the Cook Islands. He used colour photography, rather than black-and-white. The photos taken on the trip, as well as his earlier work in New Zealand, were combined for Polynesia Here and There, an touring exhibition of his work which opened at the Auckland City Art Gallery in 1983. In 1986, the same exhibition of his work, Images Pacifiques, was opened in Paris, France. The collection was later published as Images Pacifiques/Pacific Images in 1987, which earned him international attention. The Arts House Trust has since acquired the original Ektacolor prints from Jowitt's original 1983 exhibition.

Approximately 70 books and children's publications of his work were published during his career, including Pacific Island Style (1999), Feasts and Festivals (2002) and Pacific Pattern (2005).

Jowitt died from a sudden illness at his Auckland home on 22 July 2014, at the age of 59. His funeral was held at the Presbyterian Grey Lynn Church on 30 July 2014.
