= David McKinney (publisher) =

- Born: October 11, 1795; Kishacoquillas, Pennsylvania
- Died: May 28, 1879 (aged 83); Sewickley, Pennsylvania
- Education: Jefferson College; Princeton Theological Seminary
- Spouse(s): Eliza L. Finley on May 16, 1825; Sarah F. Stockley (June 2, 1846); Sarah Elizabeth Riddle (January 30, 1856)
- Children: The Rev. Isaac Newton McKinney
- Church: Presbyterian
- Ordained: April 22, 1824; Presbytery of Philadelphia

David McKinney was a prominent Presbyterian pastor, theologian, and publisher in Pennsylvania.

He graduated from Jefferson College (now Washington & Jefferson College) in 1821. In addition to his pastoral and professorial duties, he founded The Presbyterian Banner in 1852 in Philadelphia. He merged that publication with the Pittsburgh-based Presbyterian Advocate before selling the publication in 1864. By 1906, it was considered the oldest religious magazine in the country.
