= Dave Feickert =

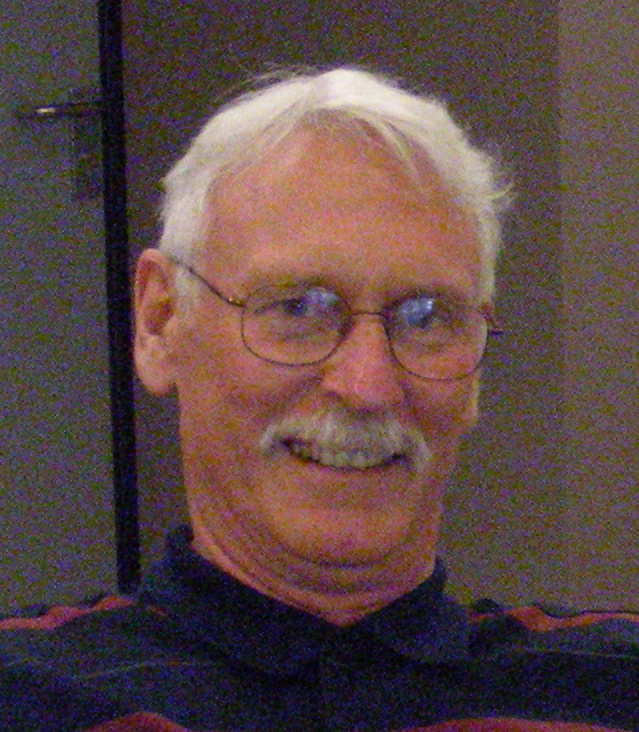
Dave Feickert

Dave Feickert (13 December 1946 – 2 July 2014) was an international mines safety advisor. In his hometown Whanganui he was a director and chairperson of the Whanganui River Institute. In 2009 he was awarded a China Friendship Prize for Foreign Experts .

== Early years ==
Feickert attended secondary school at Wanganui Technical College (now Wanganui City College).

As a Quaker he embodied the core values of the Quaker Movement. He applied them in his work in the labour movement.

== 1983 – 2003 ==
Industrial Relations officer and Head of Research with the National Union of Mineworkers (Great Britain) and later, European officer of the Trades Union Congress in Brussels.

== China ==
Encouraged the partnership of the European Commission in Brussels with the Chinese State Administration for Work Safety, SAWS.

== Pike River Mine, New Zealand ==
Dave Feickert, along with David Creedy and Bob Stevenson, former Principal Inspector of Mines in UK, offered to work on behalf of the families of the victims of the Pike River Mine disaster, to formulate a plan to recover the bodies of those killed. He also worked with former chief mines inspector Harry Bell MNZM on the same problem. He also was a witness at the Royal Commission Inquiry into the disaster which was set up November, 2010. [Note that attempts to bring his main submission into the public domain have been thwarted as a 100-year embargo has been applied to many of the submissions to the Royal Commission inquiry.]
