= David Henshaw (cartoonist) =

New Zealand cartoonist

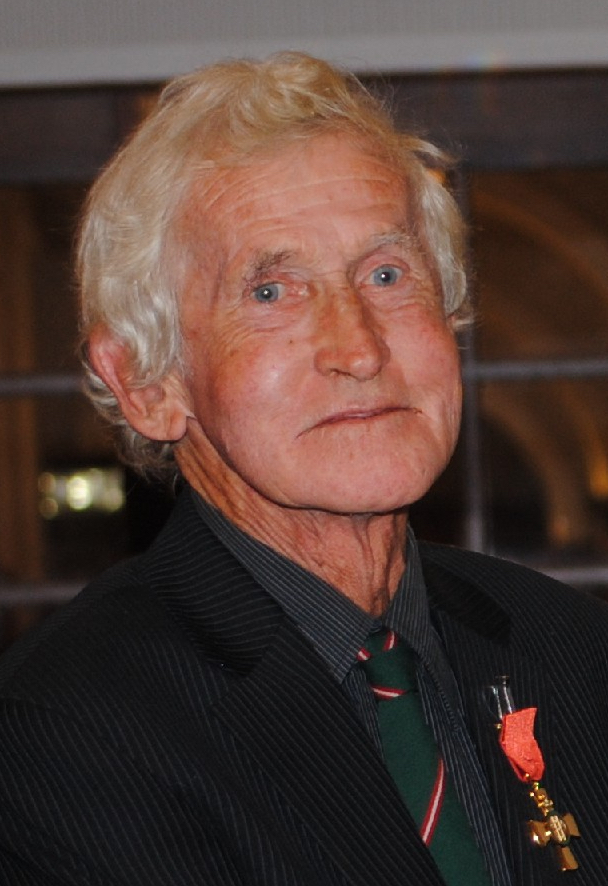
Henshaw in 2011

Thomas David Henshaw ONZM (1939 – 23 March 2014) was a New Zealand cartoonist, known for his depictions of rural life in his "Jock" cartoons, in a career spanning over 40 years. His cartoons were published in the New Zealand Farmer for 34 years. His cartoons were also published in the Manawatu Evening Standard, New Zealand Gardener, the Listener, Rod and Rifle, and Massey and Lincoln University capping magazines.

Born in Kimbolton, New Zealand in 1939, Henshaw was educated at Palmerston North Boys' High School. He then studied at Massey Agricultural College, completing the first year of a diploma in sheep farming, before going to Lincoln College where he gained a Diploma in Valuation and Farm Management.

He won the 2007 communicator of the year award from the Guild of Agricultural Journalists. In the 2011 New Year Honours, he was appointed an Officer of the New Zealand Order of Merit, for services as a cartoonist.

== Publications ==
Henshaw published a number of books, either on his own or with other authors, or as illustrator.

=== As author/co-author ===
- Henshaw, David; McBride, Graham (2010). Cowpats and brickbats: tales from the Waikato. Auckland: David Bateman. ISBN 9781869537135.
- Henshaw, David (2007). Jock's country life. Sydney: Allen Calendars. ISBN 9780473127107.
- Henshaw, David (1983). The best of Jock. Auckland: Hodder and Stoughton. ISBN 034034816X.
- Henshaw, David (1986). Jock (third collection). Auckland: Hodder and Stoughton. ISBN 0340382120.
- Henshaw, David (1976). Jock. Auckland: Hodder and Stoughton. ISBN 0340219378.
- Dawson, John; Henshaw, David (1998). Whitebait and wetlands: tales of the West Coast. Auckland: David Bateman. ISBN 1869533941.

=== As illustrator ===
- Harrison, Judy (1985). Pulling the wool: tales of a shearing gentleman. Auckland: David Bateman. ISBN 090861036X.
- Mittan, Robert J. (1989). Living well with epilepsy. Hamilton: Epilepsy New Zealand.
- Oliver, Michael; Sheild, Tony (2004). I am a working dog: natural training for sheepdogs. Dunedin: Longacre. ISBN 1877251291.
- Harrison, Judy (1986). She's a fair cow. Auckland: David Bateman. ISBN 0908610440.
- Harrison, Judy (1984). A bit of a dag: tales of a shearing gang. Auckland: David Bateman. ISBN 0908610297.
- Leech, Robin (2008). All bull: tales of an Angus studmaster. Rangiora: R.S. Leech. ISBN 9780473142759.
- Caracciolo, Frances, ed. (1980). Top yarns from the New Zealand Farmer. Auckland: Shortland. ISBN 0868670634.
- Firth, Rusty (1988). Farmers are bananas, or how to make a fortune in farming. Palmerston North: R. Firth. ISBN 0473006979.
- Bell, Daphne (2005). The grant seeker's guide to successful funding applications. Hamilton: Trust Waikato. ISBN 0473105098.
- Lucas, Diane (1987). Woodlots in the landscape. Wellington: Landscape.
- Moss, Geoffrey; Magurk, John, eds. (1976). Ways with words. Wellington: Government Printer. ISBN 0477010016.
- Firth, Rusty (1978). Peasants or plutocrats. Palmerston North: R. Firth. ISBN 0473000148.
