= Harold Titter =

New Zealand businessman (1930–2022)

Harold Titter CMG
- Born: Harold Mervyn Titter; 25 September 1930; New Plymouth, New Zealand
- Died: 18 February 2022 (aged 91)
- Occupation: Accountant
- Spouse: Margaret Jensen (m. 1955; died 2016)
- Children: 4

Harold Mervyn Titter CMG (25 September 1930 – 18 February 2022) was a New Zealand businessman and public administrator.

== Biography ==
Titter was born on 25 September 1930 in New Plymouth, the son of William Bernard John Titter and Murial Alison (née Hunt). He attended Central School in New Plymouth and then New Plymouth Boys' High School from 1944 to 1948. He graduated from Victoria University College in 1952 or 1953 (sources differ) with a Bachelor of Commerce degree, and became a chartered accountant, business consultant and company director, serving on the boards of companies including Trustpower, Fernz Corporation and Port of Tauranga Limited. He was appointed to a number of public administrative roles by the New Zealand government, including: commissioner of the Auckland Area Health Board in 1989 after the board was sacked by then Minister of Health, Helen Clark; secretary of defence in 1990; and chair of the Northern Regional Health Authority.

In 1998, Titter was elected pro-chancellor of the University of Auckland, having served on the university's council since 1992.

In the 1990 Queen's Birthday Honours, Titter was appointed a Companion of the Order of St Michael and St George, for services to business management and the community. In 2001, he was conferred with an honorary doctorate by the University of Auckland.

In 1955, Titter married Margaret Jensen; they were to have three sons and one daughter. Titter was predeceased by his wife in 2016. He died on 18 February 2022, at the age of 91.
