= Dave Comer =

New Zealand photographer

- Born: David John Comer; 26 July 1956; Dunedin, New Zealand
- Died: 25 December 2014 (aged 58); New Zealand
- Occupations: Still photographer Location scout
- Years active: 1980s–2014
- Known for: The Lord of the Rings; The Hobbit

David John Comer (26 July 1956 – 25 December 2014) was a New Zealand still photographer. He was the location scout for The Lord of the Rings and The Hobbit film series.

== Early life ==
Comer was born in Dunedin. He studied photography and fine arts at the University of Canterbury. He worked for some time in the Fiordland region as a wilderness guide and in the jet boating industry.

== Work in advertising ==
Comer's early career involved shooting stills for commercials in the 1980s and 90s. Of note is his advertisement for the Jaguar car company in 2000, in which he was credited with developing a technique to convert still frames to motion picture film, creating a dream-like effect with the car crisp and in-focus and the background motion blurred. The advertisement won the Kodak AICP Award for Cinematography in New York City, and the commercial was added to the permanent collection of the New York Museum of Modern Art. the advertisement in question is most likely the Jaguar X-Type Wicked 2001 commercial, although he is not specifically credited.

Comer died of cancer in 2014.
