= George Griffiths (historian) =

New Zealand historian, writer, and journalist

George John Griffiths QSO (17 June 1933 – 29 January 2014) was a New Zealand historian, writer, and journalist.

Griffiths started his newspaper career in 1954 at the Southland Times, based in Invercargill, moving to Dunedin and joining the Otago Daily Times in 1962. He was to work at the latter paper until his retirement in 1991.

In 1978, Griffiths co-founded Otago Heritage Books, which published books on the history of the southern South Island, many of which were edited by Griffiths, and also operated as a central Dunedin bookshop which became a hub for local writers and historians. He also wrote numerous books, many of which were published by Otago Heritage Books, most of them relating to Otago history, and contributed many biographical articles to the Dictionary of New Zealand Biography.

In the 1990 Queen's Birthday Honours, Griffiths was appointed a Companion of the Queen's Service Order for community service. He was named as a University of Otago Hocken fellow in 1998, and Dunedin's Citizen of the Year in 1999. He was also awarded an honorary doctorate by the University of Otago.

Griffiths died in early 2014. Many of his personal papers are now held as part of the Hocken Library collection.
