= David McKinney (author) =

David McKinney (8 April 1945 – 25 February 2014) was a New Zealand-born author and journalist. McKinney lived in London, specialising in motor-racing history. He is best known for his authoritative history of the classic Maserati 250F Formula 1 Grand Prix car and as a contributor to motoring publications throughout the world.

== Career ==
Following an early career in the motor industry in New Zealand, he switched to journalism. He specialized in politics and rose to editorial positions in radio and television. His interest in motorsport led to competing as a driver in club events, and as a rally co-driver at the international level. Through this period he supplied reports to publications in New Zealand, Australia, the UK and the US, and from 1979 to 1985 was managing editor of MotorAction and NZ Motoring News. After moving to the UK in 1985, he served as editor for Motor Racing, subsequently acting as sports editor of Auto Classic, Associate Editor of Historic Race & Rally and European Editor of Historic Racing and the US publication Victory Lane. He also provided press relations support for several racing associations and contributed to publications and websites around the world.

His published works in addition to Maserati 250F (Crowood Press 2003) include The Dunlop Book of New Zealand Motorsport (Reed Methuen 1987) and Can-Am Cars (Osprey 1999). He was English language editor of Adriano Cimarosti's award-winning Complete History of Grand Prix Motor Racing (Motor Racing Publications 1990).

== Publications ==
- McKinney, David (1987). The Dunlop Book of New Zealand Motorsport. Reed Methuen. ISBN 0-474-00276-4.
- — (1999). Can-Am Cars, 1966-74. Osprey. ISBN 978-1-85532-900-3.
- — (2003). Maserati 250F. Crowood Press. ISBN 978-1-86126-568-5.
