= La Strada =

1954 Italian road tragedy film directed by Federico Fellini

- East German theatrical release poster
- Directed by: Federico Fellini
- Screenplay by: Federico Fellini; Tullio Pinelli; Ennio Flaiano
- Story by: Federico Fellini; Tullio Pinelli
- Produced by: Dino De Laurentiis; Carlo Ponti
- Starring: Giulietta Masina; Anthony Quinn; Richard Basehart
- Cinematography: Otello Martelli
- Edited by: Leo Catozzo
- Music by: Nino Rota
- Production company: Ponti-De Laurentiis Cinematografica
- Distributed by: Paramount Pictures
- Release dates: 6 September 1954 (Venice); 22 September 1954 (Italy)
- Running time: 108 minutes
- Country: Italy
- Language: Italian

La Strada (English: "The Road") is a 1954 Italian road tragedy film directed by Federico Fellini and co-written by Fellini, Tullio Pinelli and Ennio Flaiano. The film tells the story of Gelsomina (Giulietta Masina), a simple-minded young woman bought from her mother by Zampanò (Anthony Quinn), a brutish strongman who takes her with him on the road.

Fellini described La Strada as "a complete catalogue of my entire mythological world, a dangerous representation of my identity that was undertaken with no precedent whatsoever". As a result, the film demanded more time and effort than any of his other works, before or later. The development process was long and tortuous; there were problems during production, including insecure financial backing, problematic casting, and numerous delays. Finally, just before the production completed shooting, Fellini suffered a nervous breakdown that required medical treatment so that he could complete principal photography. Initial critical reaction was harsh, and the film's screening at the Venice Film Festival was the occasion of a bitter controversy that escalated into a public brawl between Fellini's supporters and detractors.

Subsequently, however, La Strada has become "one of the most influential films ever made", according to the American Film Institute. It won the inaugural Academy Award for Best Foreign Language Film in 1957. It was placed fourth in the 1992 British Film Institute directors' list of cinema's top 10 films.

In 2008, the film was included on the Italian Ministry of Cultural Heritage's 100 Italian films to be saved, a list of 100 films that "have changed the collective memory of the country between 1942 and 1978."

== Plot ==
Gelsomina, a simple-minded, dreamy young woman, learns that her sister Rosa has died after going on the road with the strongman Zampanò. Zampanò has returned a year later to ask her mother if Gelsomina will take Rosa's place. The impoverished mother, with other mouths to feed, accepts 10,000 lire (about $20), and her daughter tearfully departs the same day.

Zampanò makes his living as an itinerant street performer, traveling in a covered "Motocarro" three-wheel-motorcycle-truck, entertaining crowds by breaking an iron chain bound tightly across his chest, then passing a hat for tips. In short order, Gelsomina's naïve and antic nature emerges, with Zampanò's brutish methods presenting a callous foil. Presenting her as his wife (which she is not), he teaches her to play the snare drum and trumpet, dance a bit, and clown for the audience. Despite her willingness to please, he intimidates her, forces himself upon her, and treats her cruelly at times. She develops a tenderness for him that is betrayed when he goes off with another woman one evening, leaving Gelsomina abandoned in the street. However, even in her wretchedness she manages to find beauty and wonder, aided by some local children.

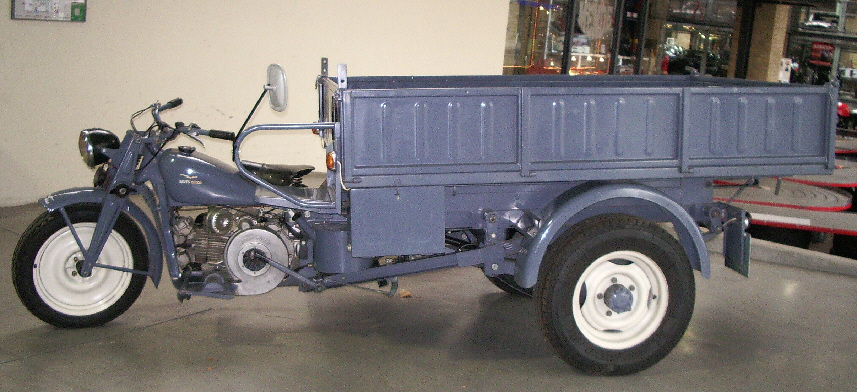
Italian "Motocarro" three-wheel-motorcycle-truck, similar to the Vardo (covered wagon) used by Zampanò

Gelsomina finally rebels and leaves, making her way into town. There she watches the act of another street entertainer, Il Matto ("The Fool"), a talented high wire artist and clown. When Zampanò finds her, he forcibly takes her back. They join a ragtag travelling circus where Il Matto already works. Il Matto teases the strongman at every opportunity, though he cannot explain what motivates him to do so. After Il Matto drenches Zampanò with a pail of water, Zampanò chases after his tormentor with his knife drawn. As a result, he is briefly jailed, and both men are fired from the travelling circus.

Before Zampanò's release from prison, Il Matto proposes to Gelsomina that there are alternatives to her servitude and imparts his philosophy that everything and everyone has a purpose – even a pebble, even she. A nun suggests that Gelsomina's purpose in life is comparable to her own. But when Gelsomina offers Zampanò marriage, he brushes her off.

On an empty stretch of road, Zampanò comes upon Il Matto fixing a flat tire. As Gelsomina watches in horror, the two men begin to fight; it ends after the strongman punches the clown on the head several times, causing the fool to hit his head on the corner of his car's roof. As Zampanò walks back to his motocarro with a warning for the man to watch his mouth in the future, Il Matto complains that his watch has stopped, then stumbles into a field, collapses, and dies. Zampanò hides the body and pushes the car off the road, where it bursts into flames.

The killing breaks Gelsomina's spirit. She becomes apathetic and succumbs to madness, constantly repeating "The Fool is hurt." Zampanò makes a few small attempts to console her, but in vain. Fearful he will no longer be able to earn a living with Gelsomina, Zampanò abandons her while she sleeps, leaving her some clothes, money, and his trumpet.

Some years later, he overhears a woman singing the very tune Gelsomina often played. He learns that the woman's father had found Gelsomina on the beach and had kindly taken her in. However, she had wasted away, did not speak much and the only thing she did was to play the melody on the trumpet. One day she went to sleep and never woke up. Zampanò gets drunk, gets in a fight with the locals, and wanders to the beach, where he breaks down in tears.

== Cast ==
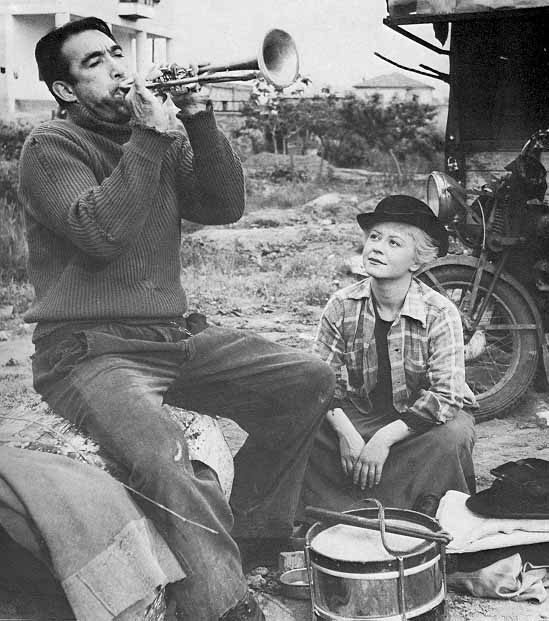
Quinn and Masina in a film scene.

- Giulietta Masina as Gelsomina
- Anthony Quinn as Zampanò
- Richard Basehart as Il Matto ("The Fool")
- Aldo Silvani as Giraffa, the circus owner
- Marcella Rovere as the widow
- Livia Venturini as the nun

== Production ==
=== Background ===
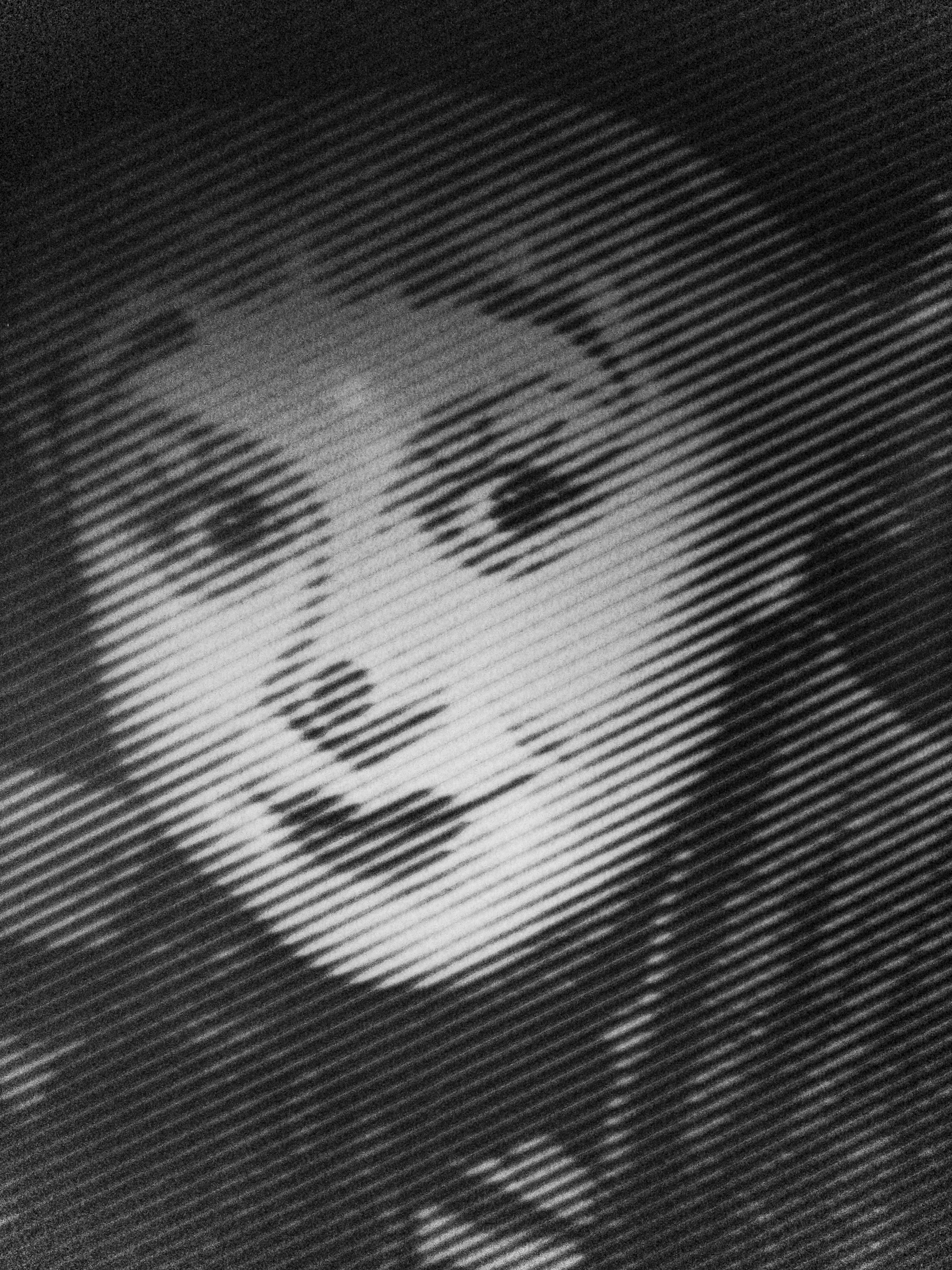
Giulietta Masina as Gelsomina. "Masina's character is perfectly suited to her round clown's face and wide, innocent eyes; in one way or another, in Juliet of the Spirits, Ginger and Fred and most of her other films, she was always playing Gelsomina." -- Roger Ebert, Chicago Sun-Times

Fellini's creative process for La Strada began with vague feelings, "a kind of tone," he said, "that lurked, which made me melancholy and gave me a diffused sense of guilt, like a shadow hanging over me. This feeling suggested two people who stay together, although it will be fatal, and they don't know why." These feelings evolved into certain images: snow silently falling on the ocean, various compositions of clouds, and a singing nightingale. At that point, Fellini sketched these images, a habitual tendency that he claimed he had learned early in his career when he had worked in provincial music halls and had to draw the characters and sets. Finally, he reported that the idea first "became real" to him when he drew a circle on a piece of paper to depict Gelsomina's head, and he decided to base the character on the actual character of Giulietta Masina, his wife of five years at the time: "I utilized the real Giulietta, but as I saw her. I was influenced by her childhood photographs, so elements of Gelsomina reflect a ten-year-old Giulietta."

The idea for the character Zampanò came from Fellini's youth in the coastal town of Rimini. A pig castrator lived there who was known as a womanizer: according to Fellini, "This man took all the girls in town to bed with him; once he left a poor idiot girl pregnant and everyone said the baby was the devil's child." In 1992, Fellini told Canadian director Damian Pettigrew that he had conceived the film at the same time as co-scenarist Tullio Pinelli in a kind of "orgiastic synchronicity":

I was directing I vitelloni, and Tullio had gone to see his family in Turin. At that time, there was no autostrada between Rome and the north and so you had to drive through the mountains. Along one of the tortuous winding roads, he saw a man pulling a carretta, a sort of cart covered in tarpaulin ... A tiny woman was pushing the cart from behind. When he returned to Rome, he told me what he'd seen and his desire to narrate their hard lives on the road. 'It would make the ideal scenario for your next film,' he said. It was the same story I'd imagined but with a crucial difference: mine focused on a little traveling circus with a slow-witted young woman named Gelsomina. So we merged my flea-bitten circus characters with his smoky campfire mountain vagabonds. We named Zampanò after the owners of two small circuses in Rome: Zamperla and Saltano.

Fellini wrote the script with collaborators Ennio Flaiano and Tullio Pinelli and brought it first to Luigi Rovere, Fellini's producer for The White Sheik (1952). When Rovere read the script for La Strada, he began to weep, raising Fellini's hopes, only to have them dashed when the producer announced that the screenplay was like great literature, but that "as a film this wouldn't make a lira. It's not cinema." By the time it was fully complete, Fellini's shooting script was nearly 600 pages long, with every shot and camera angle detailed and filled with notes reflecting intensive research. Producer Lorenzo Pegoraro was impressed enough to give Fellini a cash advance, but would not agree to Fellini's demand that Giulietta Masina play Gelsomina.

=== Casting ===
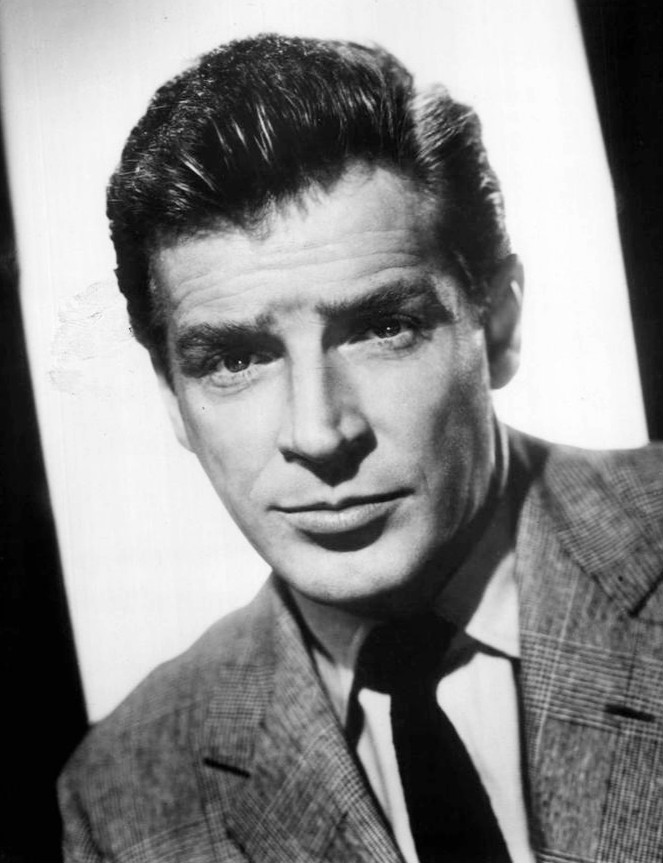
Richard Basehart, among "the first in a long line of international actors to grace Fellini's films"

Fellini secured financing through the producers Dino De Laurentiis and Carlo Ponti, who wanted to cast Silvana Mangano (De Laurentiis's wife) as Gelsomina and Burt Lancaster as Zampanò, but Fellini refused these choices. Giulietta Masina had been the inspiration for the entire project, so Fellini was determined never to accept an alternative to her. For Zampanò, Fellini had hoped to cast a nonprofessional and, to that end, he tested a number of circus strongmen, to no avail. He also had trouble finding the right person for the role of Il Matto. His first choice was the actor Moraldo Rossi, who was a member of Fellini's social circle and had the right type of personality and athletic physique, but Rossi wanted to be the assistant director, not a performer. Alberto Sordi, the star of Fellini's earlier films The White Sheik and I Vitelloni, was eager to take the role, and was bitterly disappointed when Fellini rejected him after a tryout in costume.

Ultimately, Fellini drew his three leading players from people associated with the 1954 film Donne Proibite (Angels of Darkness), directed by Giuseppe Amato, in which Masina played the very different role of a madam. Anthony Quinn was also acting in the film, while Richard Basehart was often on the set visiting his wife, actress Valentina Cortese. When Masina introduced Quinn to her husband, the actor was disconcerted by Fellini's insistence that the director had found his Zampanò, later remembering: "I thought he was a little bit crazy, and I told him I wasn't interested in the picture, but he kept hounding me for days." Not long afterwards, Quinn spent the evening with Roberto Rossellini and Ingrid Bergman, and after dinner they watched Fellini's 1953 Italian comedy–drama I Vitelloni. According to Quinn: "I was thunderstruck by it. I told them the film was a masterpiece, and that the same director was the man who had been chasing me for weeks."

Fellini was particularly taken with Basehart, who reminded the director of Charlie Chaplin. Upon being introduced to Basehart by Cortese, Fellini invited the actor to lunch, at which he was offered the role of Il Matto. When asked why by the surprised Basehart, who had never before played the part of a clown, Fellini responded: "Because, if you did what you did in Fourteen Hours you can do anything." A great success in Italy, the 1951 Hollywood drama starred Basehart as a would-be suicide on a hotel balcony. Basehart, too, had been greatly impressed by I Vitelloni, and agreed to take the role for much less than his usual salary, in part because he was very attracted by Fellini's personality, saying: "It was his zest for living, and his humor."

=== Filming ===
The film was shot in Bagnoregio, Viterbo, Lazio, and Ovindoli, L'Aquila, Abruzzo. On Sundays, Fellini and Basehart drove around the countryside, scouting locations and looking for places to eat, sometimes trying as many as six restaurants and venturing as far away as Rimini before Fellini found the desired ambiance and menu.

Production started in October 1953, but had to be halted within weeks when Masina dislocated her ankle during the convent scene with Quinn. With shooting suspended, De Laurentiis saw an opportunity to replace Masina, whom he had never wanted for the part and who had not yet been signed to a contract. This changed as soon as executives at Paramount viewed the rushes of the scene and lauded Masina's performance, resulting in De Laurentiis announcing that he had her on an exclusive and ordering her to sign a hastily prepared contract, at approximately a third of Quinn's salary.

The delay caused the entire production schedule to be revised, and cinematographer Carlo Carlini, who had a prior commitment, had to be replaced by Otello Martelli, a long-time favorite of Fellini's. When filming resumed in February 1954, it was winter. The temperature had dropped to −5 °C, often resulting in no heat or hot water, necessitating more delays and forcing the cast and crew to sleep fully dressed and wear hats to keep warm.

The new schedule caused a conflict for Anthony Quinn, who was signed to play the title role in Attila, a 1954 epic, also produced by De Laurentiis and directed by Pietro Francisci. At first, Quinn considered withdrawing from La Strada, but Fellini convinced him to work on both films simultaneously—shooting La Strada in the morning and Attila in the afternoon and evening. The plan often required the actor to get up at 3:30 am to capture the "bleak early light" that Fellini insisted on, and then leave at 10:30 to drive to Rome in his Zampanò outfit so he could be on the set in time to transform into Attila the Hun for afternoon shooting. Quinn recalled: "This schedule accounted for the haggard look I had in both films, a look that was perfect for Zampanò but scarcely OK for Attila the Hun."

Despite an extremely tight budget, production supervisor Luigi Giacosi was able to rent a small circus run by a man named Savitri, a strongman and fire-eater who coached Quinn on circus jargon and the technical aspects of chain-breaking. Giacosi also secured the services of the Zamperla Circus, which supplied a number of stuntmen who could play themselves, including Basehart's double, a high-wire artist who refused to perform when firemen arrived with a safety net.

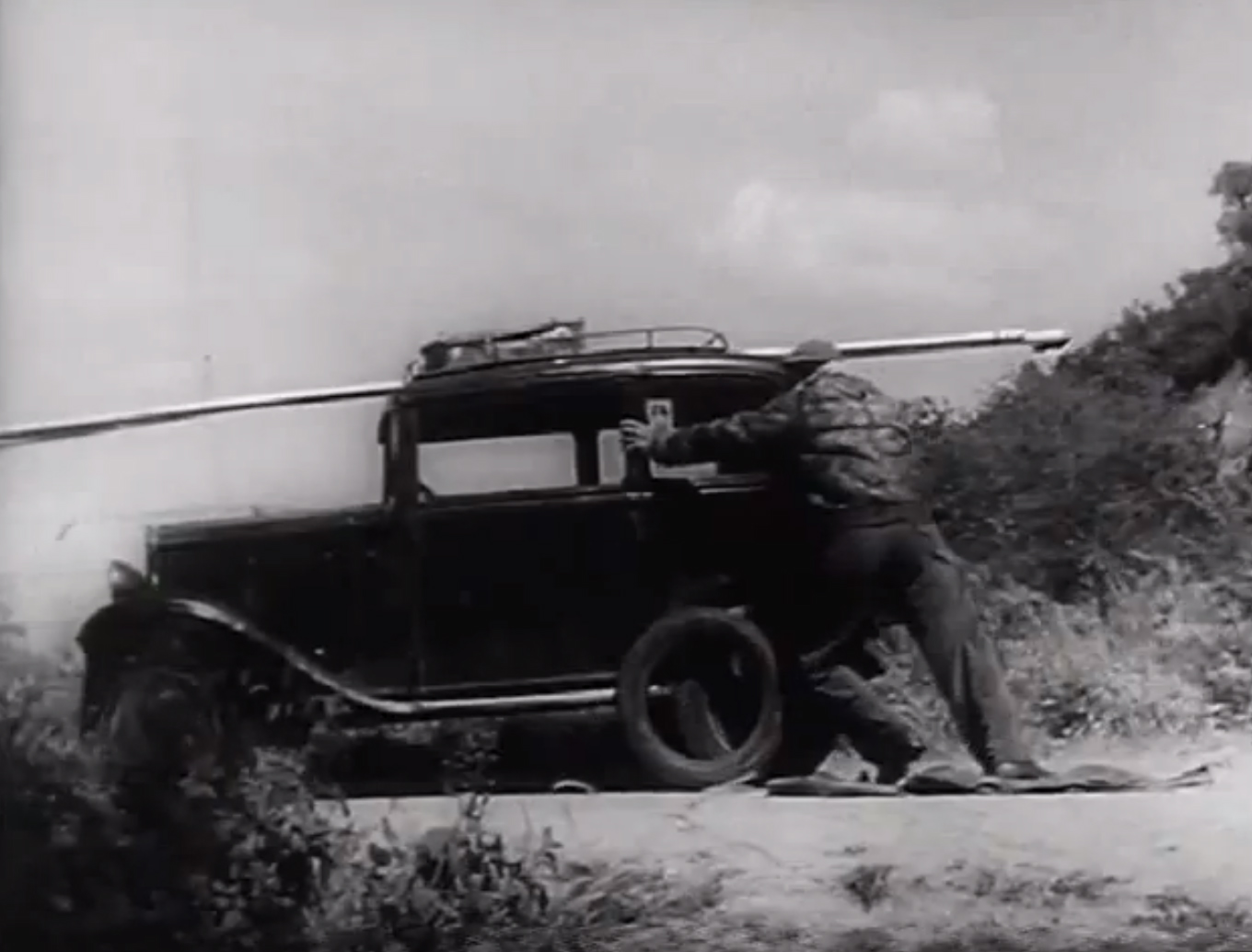
Screenshot from 1956 trailer. Circus owner Savitri provided the old car that Fellini destroyed in the scene following Zampanò's killing of Il Matto.

Funding shortages required Giacosi to improvise in response to Fellini's demands. When filming continued into spring, Giacosi was able to re-create the wintry scenes by piling thirty bags of plaster onto all the bedsheets he could find to simulate a snowscape. When a crowd scene was required, Giacosi convinced the local priest to move a celebration of the town's patron saint on 8 April up by a few days, thus securing the presence of some 4,000 unpaid extras. To guarantee that the crowd did not dissipate as the hours passed, Fellini instructed assistant director Rossi to shout "Get the rooms ready for Totò and Sophia Loren" (two of the most popular Italian entertainers of the period), so nobody left.

Fellini was a notorious perfectionist, and this could be trying for his cast. At an American Film Institute student seminar, Quinn spoke of Fellini's intransigence over selecting a box in which Zampanò carries his cigarette butts, scrutinizing over 500 boxes before finding just the right one: "As for me, any of the boxes would have been satisfactory to carry the butts in, but not Federico". Quinn also recalled being particularly proud of a certain scene in which his performance had earned applause from onlookers on the set, only to receive a phone call from Fellini late that night informing him that they would have to re-do the entire sequence because Quinn had been too good: "You see, you're supposed to be a bad, a terrible actor, but the people watching applauded you. They should have laughed at you. So in the morning we do it again." As for Masina, Fellini insisted that she re-create the thin-lipped smile he had seen in her childhood photographs. He cut her hair by putting a bowl on her head and shearing off anything that wasn't covered up, afterwards plastering what remained with soap to give it a "spiky, untidy look", then "flicked talc into her face to give it the pallor of a kabuki performer". He made her wear a World War I surplus cloak that was so frayed that its collar cut into her neck. She complained: "You're so nice and sweet to the others in the cast. Why are you so hard on me?"

Under Fellini's agreement with his producers, budget overruns had to come out of his own pocket, cutting into any profit potential. Fellini recounted that when it became clear there was insufficient funding to finish the picture, Ponti and De Laurentiis took him to lunch to assure him that they would not hold him to it: "Let's pretend [the funding agreements] were a joke. Buy us a coffee and we'll forget about them." According to Quinn, however, Fellini was able to obtain this indulgence only by agreeing to film some pickup shots for Attila that Francisci, the director of record, had neglected to complete.

While shooting the final scenes on the wharf of Fiumicino, Fellini suffered a severe bout of clinical depression, a condition that he and his associates tried to keep secret. He was able to complete the filming only upon receiving treatment by a prominent Freudian psychoanalyst.

=== Sound ===
As was the common practice for Italian films at the time, shooting was done without sound; dialogue was added later along with music and sound effects. As a consequence, cast members generally spoke in their native language during filming: Quinn and Basehart in English, Masina and the others in Italian. Liliana Betti, Fellini's long-time assistant, has described the director's typical procedure regarding dialogue during filming, a technique he called the "number system" or "numerological diction": "Instead of lines, the actor has to count off numbers in their normal order. For instance, a line of fifteen words equals an enumeration of up to thirty. The actor merely counts till thirty: 1-2-3-4-5-6-7. etc." Biographer John Baxter has commented on the usefulness of such a system: "It helps pinpoint an instant in the speech where he [Fellini] wants a different reaction. 'Go back to 27,' he'll tell an actor, 'but this time, smile.'" Since he didn't need to worry about noise while shooting a scene, Fellini kept up a running commentary during filming, a practice that scandalized more traditional filmmakers, like Elia Kazan: "He talked through each take, in fact yelled at the actors. 'No, there, stop, turn, look at her, look at her. See how sad she is, see her tears? Oh, the poor wretch! You want to comfort her? Don't turn away; go to her. Ah, she doesn't want you, does she? What? Go to her anyway!' ... That's how he's able ... to use performers from many countries. He does part of the acting for the actors."

Since Quinn and Basehart did not speak Italian, both were dubbed in the original release. Unhappy with the actor who initially dubbed Zampanò, Fellini remembered being impressed by the work done by Arnoldo Foà in dubbing the Toshiro Mifune character in the Italian version of Akira Kurosawa's Rashomon, and was able to secure Foà's services at the very last moment. Composer Michel Chion has observed that Fellini particularly exploited the tendency of Italian films of the post-war period to allow considerable freedom in the synching of voices to lip movements, especially in contrast to Hollywood's perceived "obsessive fixation" with the matching of voices to mouths: "In Fellinian extremes, when all those post-synched voices float around bodies, we reach a point where voices—even if we continue to attribute them to the bodies they're assigned—begin to acquire a sort of autonomy, in a baroque and decentered fashion." In the Italian version of La Strada, there are even instances when a character is heard to speak while the actor's mouth is shut tight.

Fellini scholar Thomas Van Order has pointed out that Fellini is equally free in the treatment of ambient sound in his films, preferring to cultivate what Chion called "a subjective sense of point of audition", in which what is heard on screen mirrors a particular character's perceptions, as opposed to the visible reality of the scene. As an example, ducks and chickens appear on the screen throughout Gelsomina's conversation with the nun, but, reflecting the girl's growing sense of enlightenment concerning her place in the world, the quacking and clucking of barnyard fowl dissolves into the chirping of songbirds.

The visual track of the 1956 English-language version of La Strada was identical to the original Italian version, but the audio track was completely re-edited under the supervision of Carol and Peter Riethof at Titra Sound Studios in New York, without any involvement by Fellini. Thomas Van Order has identified dozens of changes made in the English version, classifying the alterations into four categories: "1. lower volume of music relative to dialogue in the English version; 2. new musical selections and different editing of music in many scenes; 3. different ambient sound in some scenes, as well as changes in the editing of ambient sound; 4. elimination of some dialogue." In the English version, Quinn and Basehart dubbed their own roles, but Masina was dubbed by another actress, a decision that has been criticised by Van Order and others, since, by trying to match the childlike movements of the character, the sound editors provided a voice that is "childishly high, squeaky and insecure". It cost $25,000 to dub La Strada into English, but after the film started to receive its many accolades, it was re-released in the United States on the art-house circuit in its Italian version, using subtitles.

=== Music ===
The entire score for La Strada was written by Nino Rota after principal photography was completed. The main theme is a wistful tune that appears first as a melody played by the Fool on a kit violin and later by Gelsomina on her trumpet. Its last cue in the penultimate scene is sung by the woman who tells Zampanò the fate of Gelsomina after he abandoned her. This is one of three primary themes that are introduced during the titles at the beginning of La Strada and that recur regularly throughout the film. To these are added a fourth recurring theme that appears in the very first sequence, after Gelsomina meets Zampanò, and is often interrupted or silenced in his presence, occurring less and less frequently and at increasingly lower volumes as the film progresses. Claudia Gorbman has commented on the use of these themes, which she deems true leitmotifs, each of which is not simply an illustrative or redundant identifying tag, but "a true signifier that accumulates and communicates meaning not explicit in the images or dialogue".

In practice, Fellini shot his films while playing taped music because, as he explained in a 1972 interview, "it puts you in a strange dimension in which your fantasy stimulates you". For La Strada, Fellini used a variation by Arcangelo Corelli that he planned to use on the sound track. Rota, unhappy with that plan, wrote an original motif (with echoes of the "Larghetto" from Dvořák's Opus 22 Serenade for Strings in E major) with rhythmic lines matched to Corelli's piece that synchronize with Gelsomina's movements with the trumpet and Il Matto's with the violin.

== Release ==
The film premiered at the 15th Venice International Film Festival on 6 September 1954 and won the Silver Lion. It was released in Italy on 22 September 1954, and in the United States on 16 July 1956.

In 1994, a new print was financed by filmmaker Martin Scorsese, who has acknowledged that since childhood he has related to the character of Zampanò, bringing elements of the self-destructive brute into his films Taxi Driver and Raging Bull.

== Reception ==
=== Critical response ===
==== Initial response ====
"A deceptively simple and poetic parable, Federico Fellini's La Strada was the focus of a critical debate when it premiered in 1954 simply because it marked Fellini's break with neorealism -- the hard-knocks school that had dominated Italy's postwar cinema."

— Rita Kempley, Washington Post.

Tullio Cicciarelli of Il Lavoro nuovo saw the film as "an unfinished poem," left unfinished deliberately by the filmmaker for fear that "its essence be lost in the callousness of critical definition, or in the ambiguity of classification," while Ermanno Continin of Il Secolo XIX praised Fellini as "a master story-teller":

The narrative is light and harmonious, drawing its essence, resilience, uniformity and purpose from small details, subtle annotations and soft tones that slip naturally into the humble plot of a story apparently void of action. But how much meaning, how much ferment enrich this apparent simplicity. It is all there although not always clearly evident, not always interpreted with full poetical and human eloquence: it is suggested with considerable delicacy and sustained by a subtle emotive force.

Others saw it differently. When the 1954 Venice Film Festival jury awarded La Strada the Silver Lion while ignoring Luchino Visconti's Senso, a brawl broke out when Visconti's assistant Franco Zeffirelli blew a whistle during Fellini's acceptance speech, only to be attacked by Moraldo Rossi. The disturbance left Fellini pale and shaken and Masina in tears.

The Venice premiere began "in an inexplicably chilly atmosphere," according to Tino Ranieri, and "the audience, who rather disliked it as the screening began, seemed to change opinion slightly toward the end, yet the movie didn't receive—in any sense of the word—the response that it deserved."

Reviewing for Corriere della Sera, Arturo Lanocita argued that the film "gives the impression of being a rough copy that merely hints at the main points of the story ... Fellini seems to have preferred shadow where marked contrast would have been more effective." Nino Ghelli of Bianco e Nero regretted that after "an excellent beginning, the style of the film remains harmonious for some time until the moment when the two main characters are separated, at which point the tone becomes increasingly artificial and literary, the pace increasingly fragmentary and incoherent."

Fellini biographer Tullio Kezich observed that Italian critics "make every effort to find faults with [Fellini's] movie after the opening in Venice. Some say that it starts out okay but then the story completely unravels. Others recognize the pathos in the end, but don't like the first half."

Its French release the next year found a warmer reception. Dominique Aubier of Cahiers du cinéma thought La Strada belonged to "the mythological class, a class intended to captivate the critics more perhaps than the general public." Aubier concluded:

Fellini attains a summit rarely reached by other film directors: style at the service of the artist's mythological universe. This example once more proves that the cinema has less need of technicians—there are too many already—than of creative intelligence. To create such a film, the author must have had not only a considerable gift for expression but also a deep understanding of certain spiritual problems.

The film ranked 7th on Cahiers du Cinéma's Top 10 Films of the Year List in 1955. In his March 1955 review for Arts magazine, Jean Aurel cited Giulietta Masina's performance as "directly inspired by the best in Chaplin, but with a freshness and sense of timing that seem to have been invented for this film alone." He found the film "bitter, yet full of hope. A lot like life." Louis Chauvet of Le Figaro noted that "the atmosphere of the drama" was combined "with a visual strength that has rarely been equalled." For influential film critic and theorist André Bazin, Fellini's approach was

the very opposite of psychological realism that maintains analysis followed by the description of feelings. In this quasi-Shakespearean universe, however, anything can happen. Gelsomina and the Fool carry an aura of the marvellous around with them, which confuses and irritates Zampanò, but this quality is neither supernatural nor gratuitous, nor even poetic, it appears as a quality possible in nature.

For Cicciarelli,

The film should be accepted for its strange fragility and its often too colourful, almost artificial moments, or else totally rejected. If we try to analyze Fellini's film, its fragmentary quality becomes immediately evident and we are obliged to treat each fragment, each personal comment, each secret confession separately.

Critical reaction in the UK and the US was equally mixed, with disparaging reviews appearing in Films in Review ("the quagmire of cheap melodrama"), Sight & Sound ("a director striving to be a poet when he is not") and The Times of London ("realism crowing on a dung-hill."), while more favorable assessments were provided by Newsweek ("novel and arguable") and Saturday Review ("With La Strada Fellini takes his place as the true successor to Rossellini and De Sica."). In his 1956 New York Times review, A.H. Weiler was especially complimentary of Quinn: "Anthony Quinn is excellent as the growling, monosyllabic and apparently ruthless strong man, whose tastes are primitive and immediate. But his characterization is sensitively developed so that his innate loneliness shows through the chinks of his rough exterior."

In a 1957 interview, Fellini reported that Masina had received over a thousand letters from abandoned women whose husbands had returned to them after seeing the film and that she had also heard from many people with disabilities who had gained a new sense of self-worth after viewing the film: "Such letters come from all over the world".

==== Retrospective evaluation ====
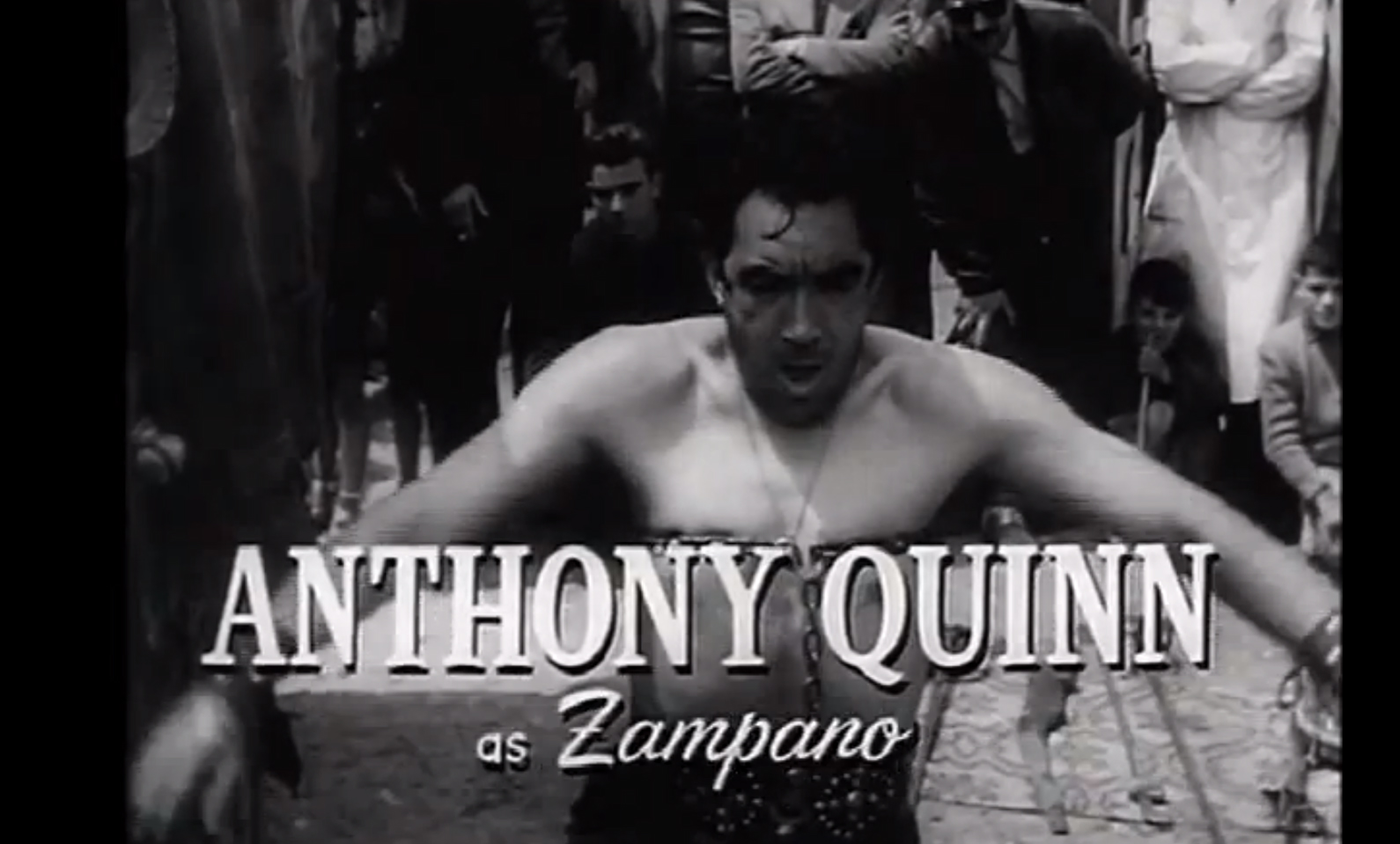
Screenshot from 1956 trailer to La Strada

In later years, Fellini explained that from "a sentimental point of view," he was "most attached" to La Strada: "Above all, because I feel that it is my most representative film, the one that is the most autobiographical; for both personal and sentimental reasons, because it is the film that I had the greatest trouble in realizing and that gave me the most difficulty when it came time to find a producer." Of all the imaginary beings he had brought to the screen, Fellini felt closest to the three principals of La Strada, "especially Zampanò." Anthony Quinn found working for Fellini invaluable: "He drove me mercilessly, making me do scene after scene over and over again until he got what he wanted. I learned more about film acting in three months with Fellini than I'd learned in all the movies I'd made before then." Long afterwards, in 1990, Quinn sent a note to the director and his co-star: "The two of you are the highest point in my life – Antonio."

Critic Roger Ebert, in his book The Great Movies, described the current critical consensus as holding that La Strada was the high point of Fellini's career and that, after this film, "his work ran wild through the jungles of Freudian, Christian, sexual and autobiographical excess". Ebert's own opinion was to see La Strada as "part of a process of discovery that led to the masterpieces La Dolce Vita (1960), 8½ (1963) and Amarcord (1974)".

The years since its initial release have solidified the high estimation of La Strada. It holds a 98% rating on the review aggregator website Rotten Tomatoes from 80 reviewers who, on average, scored it 8.3 on a scale of 10. The website's critics consensus reads: "Giulietta Masina and Anthony Quinn's pitiable pair of outsiders provide a poignant contrast between gentleness and might in Federico Fellini's unforgettable parable."

Its numerous appearances on lists of best films include the 1992 Directors' poll of the British Film Institute (4th best), the New York Times "Best 1,000 Movies Ever Made", In January 2002, the film (along with Nights of Cabiria) was included on the list of the "Top 100 Essential Films of All Time" by the National Society of Film Critics. In 2009, the film was ranked at number 10 on Japanese film magazine Kinema Junpo's Top 10 Non-Japanese Films of All Time list. In the British Film Institute's 2012 Sight & Sound polls of the greatest films ever made, La Strada was ranked 26th among directors. The film was included in BBC's 2018 list of The 100 greatest foreign language films voted by 209 film critics from 43 countries around the world.

In 1995, the Catholic Church's Pontifical Commission for Social Communications issued a list of 45 films representing a "cross section of outstanding films, chosen by a committee of twelve international movie scholars." This has come to be known as the Vatican film list, and includes La Strada as one of 15 films in the sub-category labeled Art. Pope Francis, has said it is "the movie that perhaps I loved the most," because of his personal identification with its implicit reference to his namesake, Francis of Assisi.

The Japanese filmmaker Akira Kurosawa cited this movie as one of his 100 favorite films.

=== Awards and nominations ===
La Strada won more than fifty international awards, including an Oscar in 1957 for Best Foreign Language Film, the first recipient in that category.

Award/Festival	Category	Recipients	Result
Academy Awards	Best Foreign Language Film	Dino De Laurentiis, Carlo Ponti	Won
Academy Awards	Best Writing, Best Original Screenplay	Federico Fellini, Tullio Pinelli and Ennio Flaiano	Nominated
Bodil Awards	Best European Film	Federico Fellini	Won
Blue Ribbon Awards	Best Foreign Language Film	Federico Fellini	Won
British Academy of Film and Television Arts	Best Film from any Source	Federico Fellini	Nominated
British Academy of Film and Television Arts	Best Foreign Actress	Giulietta Masina	Nominated
Nastro d'Argento	Silver Ribbon; Best Director	Federico Fellini	Won
Nastro d'Argento	Silver Ribbon; Best Producer	Dino De Laurentiis, Carlo Ponti	Won
Nastro d'Argento	Silver Ribbon; Best Story/Screenplay	Dino De Laurentiis, Tullio Pinelli	Won
Kinema Junpo Awards, Japan	Best Foreign Language Film	Federico Fellini	Won
New York Film Critics Circle Awards	Best Foreign Language Film	Federico Fellini	Won
Venice Film Festival	Silver Lion	Federico Fellini	Won
Venice Film Festival	Golden Lion	Federico Fellini	Nominated

== Legacy ==
"La Strada is nothing less than a rite of passage, a vision of perennially failing pig-man. Zampanò is here, at the center of a debased culture once again: a spiritually abandoned savage, who, trudging in a circle, makes a show of breaking voluntarily assumed chains--his destiny to burrow at last in shifting sand with the tide coming in and the sky bereft of illusion, having rejected the Clown and destroyed the Fool in himself."

— Vernon Young, Hudson Review.

During Fellini's early film career, he was closely associated with the movement known as neorealism, a set of films produced by the Italian film industry during the post-World War II period, particularly 1945–1952, and characterized by close attention to social context, a sense of historical immediacy, political commitment to progressive social change, and an anti-Fascist ideology. Although there were glimpses of certain lapses in neorealistic orthodoxy in some of his first films as a director, La Strada has been widely viewed as a definitive break with the ideological demands of neorealist theorists to follow a particular political slant or embody a specific "realist" style. This resulted in certain critics vilifying Fellini for, as they saw it, reverting to prewar attitudes of individualism, mysticism and preoccupation with "pure style". Fellini vigorously responded to this criticism: "Certain people still think neorealism is fit to show only certain kinds of reality, and they insist that this is social reality. It is a program, to show only certain aspects of life". Film critic Millicent Marcus wrote that "La Strada remains a film indifferent to the social and historical concerns of orthodox neorealism". Soon, other Italian filmmakers, including Michelangelo Antonioni and even Fellini's mentor and early collaborator Roberto Rossellini were to follow Fellini's lead and, in the words of critic Peter Bondanella, "pass beyond a dogmatic approach to social reality, dealing poetically with other equally compelling personal or emotional problems". As film scholar Mark Shiel has pointed out, when it won the first Academy Award for Best Foreign Language Film in 1957, La Strada became the first film to win international success as an example of a new brand of neorealism, "bittersweet and self-conscious".

International film directors who have named La Strada as one of their favorite films include Stanley Kwan, Anton Corbijn, Gillies MacKinnon, Andreas Dresen, Jiří Menzel, Adoor Gopalakrishnan, Mike Newell, Rajko Grlić, Laila Pakalniņa, Ann Hui, Akira Kurosawa, Kazuhiro Soda, Julian Jarrold, Krzysztof Zanussi, and Andrey Konchalovsky. David Cronenberg credits La Strada for opening his eyes to the possibilities of cinema when, as a child, he saw adults leave a showing of the film openly weeping.

The film has found its way into popular music, too. Bob Dylan and Kris Kristofferson have mentioned the film as an inspiration for their songs "Mr. Tambourine Man" and "Me and Bobby McGee", respectively, and a Serbian rock band took the film's name as their own.

Rota's main theme was adapted into a 1954 single for Perry Como under the title "Love Theme from La Strada (Traveling Down a Lonely Road)", with Italian lyrics by Michele Galdieri and English lyrics by Don Raye. Twelve years later, the composer expanded the film music to create a ballet, also called La Strada.

The New York stage has seen two productions derived from the film. A musical based on the film opened on Broadway on 14 December 1969, but closed after one performance. Nancy Cartwright, the voice of Bart Simpson, was so impressed by Giulietta Masina's work in La Strada that she tried to obtain theatrical rights to the film for a stage production in New York. After an unsuccessful attempt to meet with Fellini in Rome, she created a one-woman play, In Search of Fellini, which became the basis for her 2017 film of the same name.

In 1991, writer Massimo Marconi and cartoonist Giorgio Cavazzano adapted La Strada into a comic book titled Topolino presenta La strada: un omaggio a Federico Fellini (Mickey Mouse presents La Strada: A Tribute to Federico Fellini), featuring three Disney characters: Mickey Mouse as The Fool, Minnie as Gelsomina, and Pete as Zampanò. The storyline opens with Fellini dreaming he's on a plane with his wife to Los Angeles to receive an Academy Award and meet Walt Disney.

The name Zampanò was used as a major character in Mark Z. Danielewski's novel, House of Leaves (2000), as an old man who wrote film critique while the protagonist's mother is named Pelafina, after Gelsomina.

The short animation Once in a Million Years (2020), directed by Komeil Soheili and Jooyoung Soheili, is inspired by the story of a few stones depicted in La Strada.

== See also ==
- List of submissions to the 29th Academy Awards for Best Foreign Language Film
- List of Italian submissions for the Academy Award for Best Foreign Language Film
- Anastasini Circus
