= Susan Shentall =

British actress (1934–1996)

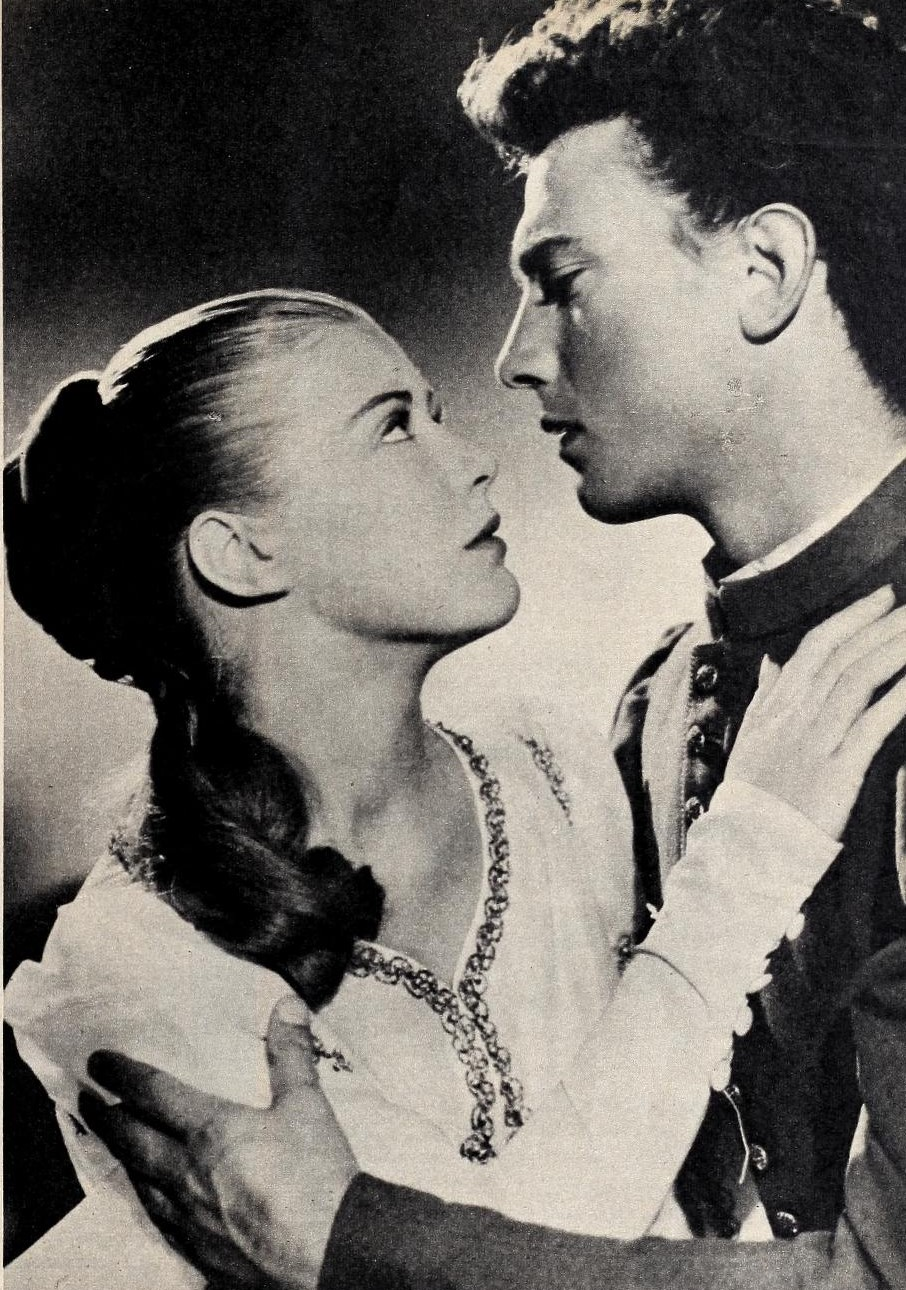
- Susan Shentall and Laurence Harvey in Romeo and Juliet (1954)
- Born: 21 May 1934; Sheffield, South Yorkshire, England
- Died: 18 October 1996 (aged 62); Market Harborough, Leicestershire, England
- Occupation: Actress
- Years active: 1954

Susan Shentall (21 May 1934 – 18 October 1996) was a British actress, known for her lead role in Renato Castellani's 1954 film adaptation of Romeo and Juliet.

== Casting in the Juliet role ==
In 1953, Shentall was discovered by the director Renato Castellani and asked to audition for the role of Juliet in a film of Romeo and Juliet. She was given the part, her first acting job. The circumstances of the discovery were subsequently queried, with an anonymous journalist stating that the Shentall family knew Joseph Janni, and the official story was a publicity stunt. This was denied. Castellani's account was that he used the London restaurant Le Caprice opened by Mario Galati for recruiting, asking for tips from Galati. Shentall's own version was published in Weekly Illustrated on 25 September 1954. Galati had asked the Shentall family for a phone number when they were dining at Le Caprice, and the following evening Janni and Sandro Ghenzi, producers of the film, with Castellani, met the Shentalls at a hotel. Susan Shentall then did a screen test with Robert Krasker, the cinematographer, at his house. The film was a co-production, by the Rank Organisation and Universalcine (Verona). Joan Collins in her autobiography comments that Rank wanted her in the role of Juliet; but neither she ("I did not think I was the Juliet type", more a Cleopatra) nor Castellani liked the idea, and the suggestion was dealt with by a pretext about a Roman nose.

Castellani began with a wish to film with an Italian script based largely on the original novella by Luigi Da Porto, leaving aside the Shakespeare text. He had to accept compromises with Rank, including working in English and the Romeo casting, but in making the film adhered to some key tenets of Italian neorealism, including location shooting, and the use of non-professional actors, of credible ages for the roles. Irving Thalberg, in his Romeo and Juliet of the Hays Code Hollywood era, cast Norma Shearer as Juliet, in her mid-thirties, which allowed sexual knowingness in the role to pass as unproblematic. Bosley Crowther in his New York Times review of the film wrote that Castellani' "set out to make a motion picture of a murderous and meaningless feud between two proud and powerful families in fifteenth-century Italy and, in the middle of it, a piteous romance between two innocent youngsters of these clans. The lyrical language of Shakespeare, generally spoken by mature performers on the stage, was plainly secondary to his concept of a vivid visual build-up of his theme." The Harvard Crimson, which thought Shentall's performance held the film together, commented that she, "being only five years off the mark herself, has turned the actress' bugaboo of Juliet's age (not quite 14) splendidly to her advantage."

Dilys Powell wrote in the Sunday Times:

Castellani is known for working wonders with non-professionals. But it is all very well to use non-professionals in Italy, where every man is an actor, and in the realistic, colloquial film, where emotion need not be discovered in the artificial cadences of verse.

Shentall in her role as Juliet was criticised as being an amateur actress; and her co-star Laurence Harvey said that a professional will always suffer as a result of working with an amateur. Quinn wrote "Shentall's representation of a youthful, innocent woman encountering love and its subsequent wants and privations was, despite some criticisms, generally accepted as being commendable", and cites Russell Jackson's view that Castellani may have been ahead of his time in the treatment. Jackson added "the emphasis in his direction is on Juliet's vulnerability and modesty, and on the image of the pale white body."

The mise-en-scène of the film was in the hands of Leonor Fini, dominated by an Early Renaissance look. Freddy Buache praised the costumes as beautiful, and wrote that the ball scene was unforgettable, in which Juliet wore a dress modelled on one in Sandro Botticelli's The Wedding of Nostagio degli Onesti; Michael Anderegg, noting criticism of the acting of both Harvey and Shentall, wrote that Shentall was "without doubt, the most effective and affecting of screen Juliets", dressed and coiffed "like a Botticelli angel." Kenneth S. Rothwell wrote:

Castellani's compulsion to reproduce the Italian painters on the screen extended even to the point of casting Susan Shentall as Juliet, not so much because she could act the part as that she resembled a young lady in a fifteenth-century portrait. Even so, despite this handicap, she brought a great deal more to the role of Juliet than did her leading man, Laurence Harvey, to Romeo.

== Personal life ==
Susan Shentall was the daughter of Harold Shentall, a businessman who was involved with Chesterfield FC, and was chairman of the England selectors at the time of the 1954 Hungary v England football match. She was brought up in Old Brampton, and attended girl's boarding schools in the Malvern area, Lawnside School and St James's School. Aged 18, she was a secretarial college student in London.

She was married to Philip Worthington in 1954. He was the only son of Charles Edward Worthington (1897–1970) of Leicester, Lord Mayor there in 1945–6. Charles Edward Worthington was son of Charles T. Worthington, founder of the Worthington's Cash Stores chain; and in 1937 was himself a major shareholder in Odeon Theatres Ltd., owners of the Odeon Cinemas chain.

Variety on 1 December 1954 reported "Charles Marquis Warren negotiating with British actress Susan Shentall to co-star with Jack Palance in his indie, "The Norman."" But Shentall did not act again.
