= Cameron Hawley =

American author (1905–1969)

- Born: September 19, 1905
- Died: February 9, 1969 (aged 63)

Elmer Cameron Hawley (September 19, 1905 – February 9, 1969) was an American writer of fiction from Howard, South Dakota. Much of Hawley's output concerned the pressures of modern life, particularly in a business setting. He published numerous novels and short stories.

Born in South Dakota, he worked as an executive at the Armstrong Cork Company; after a 24-year career, he retired and turned to novel writing.

== Executive Suite ==
Hawley's novel Executive Suite was the first title published by Ballantine Books in 1952. Ian Ballantine announced that he would "offer trade publishers a plan for simultaneous publishing of original titles in two editions, a hardcover 'regular' edition for bookstore sale, and a paper-cover, 'newsstand' size, low-priced edition for mass market sale." The publishing industry sat up and took notice, because the simultaneous hardcover and paperback editions of Executive Suite were obvious successes. Houghton Mifflin published the $3.00 hardcover at the same time Ballantine distributed its 35¢ paperback. By February 1953 Ballantine had sold 375,000 copies and was preparing to print 100,000 more. Houghton Mifflin sold 20,500 hardback copies. Instead of hurting hardback sales, the paperback edition gave the book more publicity.

=== Film adaptation ===
Movie rights to Executive Suite were sold to MGM, and Robert Wise directed the 1954 film of the screenplay by Ernest Lehman, also titled Executive Suite, and featuring William Holden, June Allyson, Barbara Stanwyck, Fredric March, Walter Pidgeon and Nina Foch. It was nominated for four Academy Awards.

A short-lived television series based on the film and titled Executive Suite lasted only six months for a total of 18 episodes. It was telecast on CBS from September 20, 1976, until February 11, 1977.

== Other works ==
Hawley's novel Cash McCall was made into a film of the same name in 1960 starring James Garner and Natalie Wood.

== Selected bibliography ==
- Executive Suite (1952) ISBN 978-0385294706
- Cash McCall (1955) ISBN 978-0892440382
- The Lincoln Lords (1960) ASIN B0000CKUPT
- The Hurricane Years (1968) ISBN 978-9997499806
