= 15th Venice International Film Festival =

Italian film festival in 1954

- Official festival poster by Giorgio Zucchiatti
- Location: Venice, Italy
- Founded: 1932
- Awards: Golden Lion: Romeo and Juliet
- Festival date: 22 August – 7 September 1954
- Website: www.labiennale.org/en/cinema/

Venice Film Festival chronology
- 16th 14th

The 15th Venice International Film Festival was held from 22 August to 7 September 1954.

Italian Writer Ignazio Silone was appointed as president of the jury. The Golden Lion was awarded to Romeo and Juliet, directed by Renato Castellani.

== Jury ==
=== Main Competition (Venezia 15) ===
- Ignazio Silone, Italian writer - Jury President
- Bengt Idestam-Almquist, Swedish screenwriter
- Louis Chauvet, French writer and journalist
- Carlos Fernández Cuenca, Spanish journalist, film critic and historian
- Mario Gromo, Italian journalist and film critic
- Roger Manvell, British film historian
- Pasquale Ojetti, Italian journalist and film critic
- Piero Regnoli, Italian screenwriter and film director
- Filippo Sacchi, Italian journalist and film critic

== Official Sections ==
=== Main Competition ===
The following films were selected for the main international competition:

English Title	Original Title	Director(s)	Production Country
Annaluise and Anton	Pünktchen und Anton	Thomas Engel	West Germany, Austria
The Bastard	Guacho	Lucas Demare	Argentina
The Caine Mutiny		Edward Dmytryk	United States
Camelia		Roberto Gavaldón	Mexico, Spain
Castles in Spain	El torero	René Wheeler	France, Spain
Executive Suite		Robert Wise	United States
Father Brown		Robert Hamer	United Kingdom
Ha-Maftayach Hazahav		Sasha Alexander	Israel
An Inn at Osaka	大阪の宿	Heinosuke Gosho	Japan
Judas' Kiss	El beso de Judas	Rafael Gil	Spain
Königliche Hoheit		Harald Braun	West Germany
L'air de Paris		Marcel Carné	France, Italy
La quintrala		Hugo del Carril	Argentina
La Strada		Federico Fellini	Italy
On the Waterfront		Elia Kazan	United States
Raíces		Benito Alazraki	Mexico
Rear Window		Alfred Hitchcock	United States
Rebellion of the Hanged	La rebelión de los colgados	Alfredo B. Crevenna, Emilio Fernández	Mexico
The River and Death	El río y la muerte	Luis Buñuel	Mexico
Romeo and Juliet		Renato Castellani	Italy, United Kingdom
Sansho the Bailiff	山椒大夫	Kenji Mizoguchi	Japan
Senso		Luchino Visconti	Italy
Seven Samurai	七人の侍	Akira Kurosawa	Japan
Simon Menyhért születése		Zoltán Várkonyi	Hungary
The Sixth Continent	Sesto continente	Folco Quilici	Italy
Som i drömmar		Carl Gyllenberg	Sweden
Song of Man	Песен за човека	Borislav Sharaliev	Bulgaria
Surang	सुरंग	V. Shantaram	India
Three Coins in the Fountain		Jean Negulesco	United States
Touchez Pas au Grisbi		Jacques Becker	France, Italy
Woman of Rome	La romana	Luigi Zampa	Italy, France

== Official Awards ==
The following official awards were presented at the 15th edition:

=== Main Competition ===
- Golden Lion: Romeo and Juliet by Renato Castellani
- Grand Jury Prize: Executive Suite by Robert Wise
- Silver Lion:
  - Sansho the Bailiff by Kenji Mizoguchi
  - La Strada by Federico Fellini
  - On the Waterfront by Elia Kazan
  - Seven Samurai by Akira Kurosawa
- Volpi Cup for Best Actor: Jean Gabin for Touchez Pas au Grisbi and The Air of Paris
