= Cash McCall =

1960 film

- Theatrical release poster
- Directed by: Joseph Pevney
- Screenplay by: Lenore J. Coffee; Marion Hargrove
- Based on: Cash McCall by: 1955 novel; Cameron Hawley
- Produced by: Henry Blanke
- Starring: James Garner; Natalie Wood
- Cinematography: George J. Folsey
- Edited by: Philip W. Anderson
- Music by: Max Steiner
- Distributed by: Warner Bros. Pictures
- Release dates: January 20, 1960 (Los Angeles); January 23, 1960 (USA)
- Running time: 102 minutes
- Country: United States
- Language: English
- Box office: $1,750,000 (US/ Canada)

Cash McCall is a 1960 American romantic drama film in Technicolor from Warner Bros. Pictures, produced by Henry Blanke, directed by Joseph Pevney, and starring James Garner and Natalie Wood. The film's screenplay by Lenore J. Coffee and Marion Hargrove is based upon the novel of the same name by Cameron Hawley.

The film's storyline concerns a wealthy entrepreneur who buys moribund businesses in order to first refurbish and then sell them at a considerable profit. During his latest acquisition, he's attracted to the daughter of the company's owner, which complicates both his professional and private life.

== Plot ==
Grant Austen, the head of Austen Plastics, yearns for retirement. So when Schofield Industries, his largest customer, threatens to take its business elsewhere, Austen hires a consulting firm, which finds an interested potential buyer, the notorious businessman Cash McCall.

Cash meets with Austen and his daughter Lory, who owns part of the company. Austen conceals the problem he has with Schofield Industries. Afterwards, Cash speaks to Lory privately. It turns out they met the previous summer and were attracted to each other. However, when Lory showed up at his cabin soaking wet from a summer rainstorm later that night, Cash, not ready for a serious relationship, gently turned her away. Mortified by the rejection, she fled back into the storm. When he was unable to get Lory out of his mind, Cash realized he had made a big mistake. He overpays for Austen Plastics just so he can reconnect with her.

Before the deal is finalized, Gil Clark, Cash's new assistant, discovers that Austen Plastics holds patents essential to Schofield Industries. Its alarmed boss, retired Army General Danvers, tries to buy Austen Plastics himself. Cash then decides that he could run Schofield more profitably and starts secretly buying up controlling interest in the second company.

In the middle of all the deal making, Cash proposes marriage to Lory, and she accepts. However, Maude Kennard, the assistant manager of the hotel where Cash resides, wants Cash for herself and tricks Lory into believing that she is Cash's girlfriend. Meanwhile, one of Austen's business acquaintances, Harvey Bannon, convinces him that Cash swindled him and paid much less than the company is worth, prompting Austen to sue Cash. Eventually, everything is cleared up, and Cash and Lory reconcile, while Gil talks Grant into going back to work.

== Cast ==
- James Garner as Cash McCall
- Natalie Wood as Lory Austen
- Nina Foch as Maude Kennard
- Dean Jagger as Grant Austen
- E. G. Marshall as Winston Conway
- Henry Jones as Gilmore Clark
- Otto Kruger as Will Atherson
- Roland Winters as General Danvers
- Edward Platt as Harrison Glenn, Cash's lawyer
- Edgar Stehli as Mr. Pierce
- Linda Watkins as Marie Austen, Grant's wife
- Parley Baer as Harvey Bannon
- Cosmo Sardo as Walt

== Production ==
This was one of three theatrical films produced with Garner as leading man during the period in which he was still playing the lead in the Warner Bros. television series Maverick (the other two were Darby's Rangers and Up Periscope). Garner subsequently left the studio upon winning a contentious lawsuit and continued his movie career. Cash McCall screenplay co-writer and comedy novel best seller Marion Hargrove had also written several scripts for Garner's Maverick series. Cash McCall was also the last produced screenplay in the long career of Lenore Coffee, the other screenplay co-writer.

Garner wrote in his memoirs that he felt it was "not much of a movie, but I liked Natalie."

== Reception ==
The film received mixed reviews from critics. Howard Thompson of The New York Times called it "a painless, amusing movie exercise that now and then touches solid ground." Variety wrote that the film suffered from characters that were "stock and, in some cases, foolish," and a script that "borders on the ridiculous in piling on the number and kind of [McCall's] multifarious enterprises," but "for audiences willing to accept a surface story for romantic shenanigans, the picture will suffice." Harrison's Reports wrote: "True, not too much attention to detail has been devoted to the real intricacies of business and high finance, but it's still a pleasant piece of entertainment certain to delight audiences who crave life's complexities dished out in simple mouthfuls." Richard L. Coe of The Washington Post declared: "Exactly what the makers of 'Cash McCall' thought they were doing I don't know, but they have come up with a boozy fairy tale which to men will have all the appeal 'Cinderella' presumably has for females." The Monthly Film Bulletin wrote, "The financial wangling is often quite amusing ... but nothing can prevent the film's romantic stretches seeming a trite and tedious makeweight to Cash's amoral escapades in the financial jungle."

== See also ==
- List of American films of 1960
