= Romeo and Juliet (1954 film) =

1954 film by Renato Castellani

- Directed by: Renato Castellani
- Written by: Renato Castellani
- Based on: Romeo and Juliet; 1597 play by William Shakespeare
- Produced by: Sandro Ghenzi; Joseph Janni
- Starring: Laurence Harvey; Susan Shentall; Flora Robson
- Cinematography: Robert Krasker
- Edited by: Sidney Hayers
- Music by: Roman Vlad
- Production companies: Universalcine; Verona Produzione
- Distributed by: General Film Distributors; United Artists
- Release dates: 1 September 1954 (UK); 25 November 1954 (Italy)
- Running time: 138 minutes
- Countries: United Kingdom; Italy
- Languages: English; Italian

Romeo and Juliet (Italian: Giulietta e Romeo) is a 1954 tragedy film adaptation of the Shakespearean tragedy of the same name. It is directed and written for the screen by Renato Castellani, and stars Laurence Harvey as Romeo and newcomer Susan Shentall as Juliet, with Flora Robson, Mervyn Johns, Bill Travers, Sebastian Cabot, Enzo Fiermonte and John Gielgud. A British and Italian co-production, it was released in the United Kingdom by General Film Distributors on September 1, 1954.

The film won the Golden Lion at 15th Venice International Film Festival, and was nominated for three BAFTA Awards, including Best Film and Outstanding British Film. The American National Board of Review named it Best Foreign Film and Castellani the Best Director of 1954. Despite the critical acclaim, the film was a commercial disappointment.

== Cast ==
- Laurence Harvey as Romeo
- Susan Shentall as Juliet
- Flora Robson as Nurse
- Norman Wooland as Paris
- Mervyn Johns as Friar Laurence
- Bill Travers as Benvolio
- Sebastian Cabot as Lord Capulet
- Lydia Sherwood as Lady Capulet
- Ubaldo Zollo as Mercutio
- Enzo Fiermonte as Tybalt
- Ennio Flaiano as Prince of Verona
- Giulio Garbinetto as Montague
- Nietta Zocchi as Lady Montague
- Thomas Nicholls as Brother Giovanni
- Mario Meniconi as Baldassare
- Pietro Capanna as Sansone
- Luciano Bodi as Abraham
- Dagmar Josipovitch as Rosaline
- John Gielgud as the Chorus

== Production ==
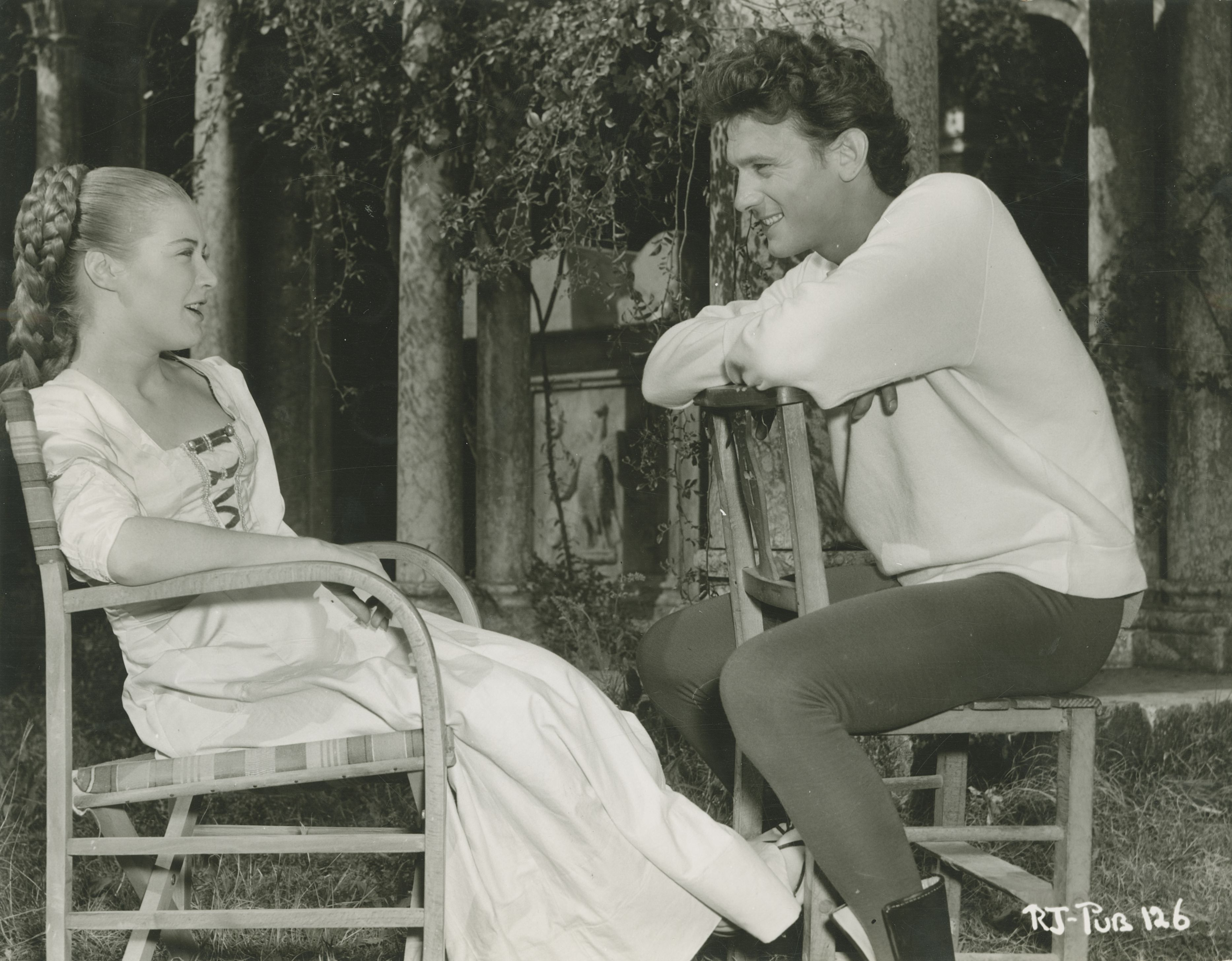
Susan Shentall and Laurence Harvey during a break on the set

Joan Collins was originally announced to play Juliet, but was replaced by Susan Shentall. A well-known stage Romeo, John Gielgud, played Castellani's chorus (and would reprise the role in the 1978 BBC Shakespeare version). Laurence Harvey, as Romeo, was already an experienced screen actor, who would shortly take over roles intended for the late James Dean in Walk on the Wild Side and Summer and Smoke. By contrast, Susan Shentall, as Juliet, was a secretarial student who was discovered by the director in a London pub, and was cast for her "pale sweet skin and honey-blonde hair." She surpassed the demands of the role, but married shortly after the shoot, and never returned to the screen.

Other parts were played by inexperienced actors, also: Mercutio was played by an architect, Montague by a gondolier from Venice, and the Prince by a novelist.

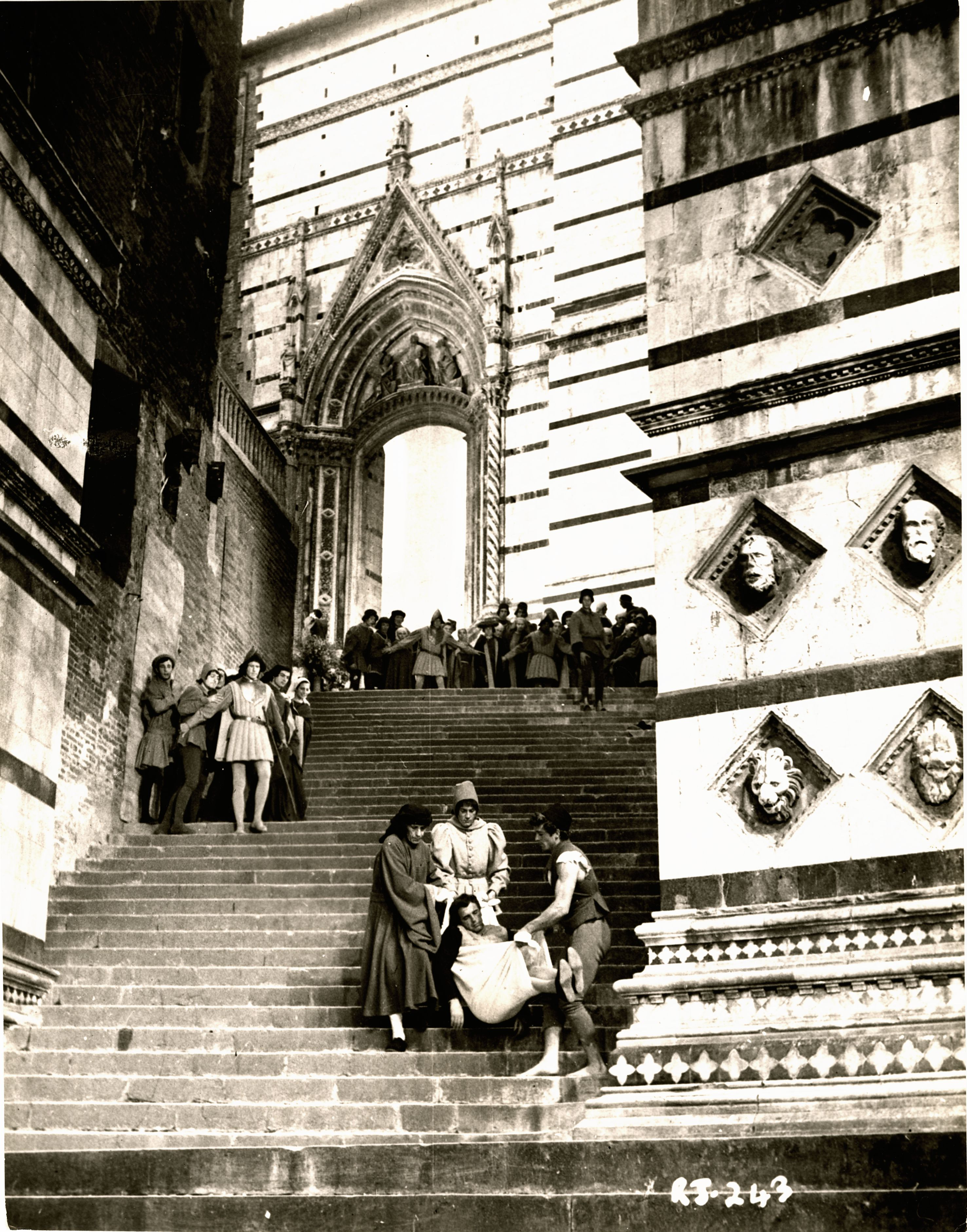
A scene shot in Siena

The film was shot at Pinewood Studios near London and on location in Italy, utilizing Renaissance-era architecture in Verona, Venice, Siena, and other cities. The costumes were designed by Leonor Fini : "The magnificent costumes were designed by the surrealist painter Léonor Fini, who drew inspiration from Botticelli, Pisanello and Piero della Francesca. ”Hervé Dumont. These costumes are now part of the Cerratelli Foundation collection.

== Reception ==
=== Critical ===
Renato Castellani won the Grand Prix at the Venice Film Festival for his 1954 film of Romeo and Juliet. His film contains interpolated scenes intended to establish the class system and Catholicism of Renaissance Verona, and the nature of the feud. Some of Castellani's changes have been criticised as ineffective: interpolated dialogue is often banal, and the Prince's appearances are reimagined as formal hearings, undermining the spontaneity of Benvolio's defence of Romeo's behaviour in the duel scene.

In New York, the National Board of Review awarded it Best Foreign Film and Best Director, and the New York Times named it one of the ten outstanding films of the year.

The major supporting roles are vastly reduced, including that of the nurse; Mercutio becomes (in the words of Daniel Rosenthal) "the tiniest of cameos", as does Tybalt, and Friar Laurence "an irritating ditherer", although Pauline Kael, who admired the film, praised Mervyn Johns's performance, claiming that he transformed the Friar from a tiresome presence to "a radiantly silly little man". Castellani's most prominent changes related to Romeo's character, cutting back or removing scenes involving his parents, Benvolio and Mercutio in order to highlight Romeo's isolation, and inserting a parting scene in which Montague coldly pulls his banished son out of Lady Montague's farewell embrace.

Another criticism made by film scholar Patricia Tatspaugh is that the realism of the settings, so carefully established throughout the film, "goes seriously off the rails when it come to the Capulets' vault". Castellani uses competing visual images in relation to the central characters: ominous grilles (and their shadows) contrasted with frequent optimistic shots of blue sky. The fatal encounter between Romeo and Tybalt is here not an actual fight; the enraged Romeo simply rushes up to Tybalt and stabs him, taking him by surprise.

Critics responded to the film as a piece of cinema (its visuals were especially admired in Italy, where it was filmed) but not as a performance of Shakespeare's play: Robert Hatch in The Nation said "We had come to see a play... perhaps we should not complain that we were shown a sumptuous travelogue", and Time′s reviewer added that "Castellani's Romeo and Juliet is a fine film poem... Unfortunately it is not Shakespeare's poem!"

=== Box office ===
Commercially response to the film was underwhelming. One journalist described it as the "unchallenged flop of the year".
