= Lucy Knoch =

American actress (1923–1990)

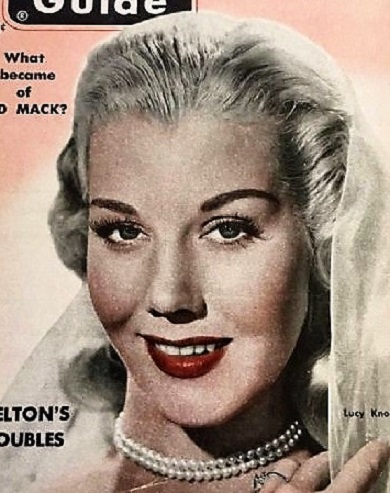
- Knoch on the cover of the December 5, 1952, issue of TV Guide
- Born: June 30, 1923
- Died: July 22, 1990 (aged 67); San Bernardino, California, U.S.
- Occupation: Actress
- Years active: 1945–1957
- Spouse: Nicholas Cancellieri (m. 1945)

Lucy Knoch (June 30, 1923–July 22, 1990) was an American actress.

== Early years ==
Knoch's parents were Mr. and Mrs. Beverly T. Knoch. Her father was a master plumber. She attended Central High School in Nashville, Tennessee. and was a member of the school's debate team. She also took dancing lessons, and she and her sister performed as a dance team at festivals in Tennessee. After she left high school she worked as a model at a photographic studio in Nashville.

The sisters traveled west by car in 1943 and met actress Paulette Goddard during a stop in Tucson, Arizona. Goddard encouraged them to extend their trip to Hollywood, inviting them to tour Paramount Studios. Arriving in Hollywood, they encountered Goddard again, and she introduced them to Everett Crosby, a talent agent. He escorted the girls to the studio lot, where director Ben Ledner offered them screen tests. The tests resulted in film contracts for both girls. Her sister left after a year, but Knoch stayed.

== Career ==
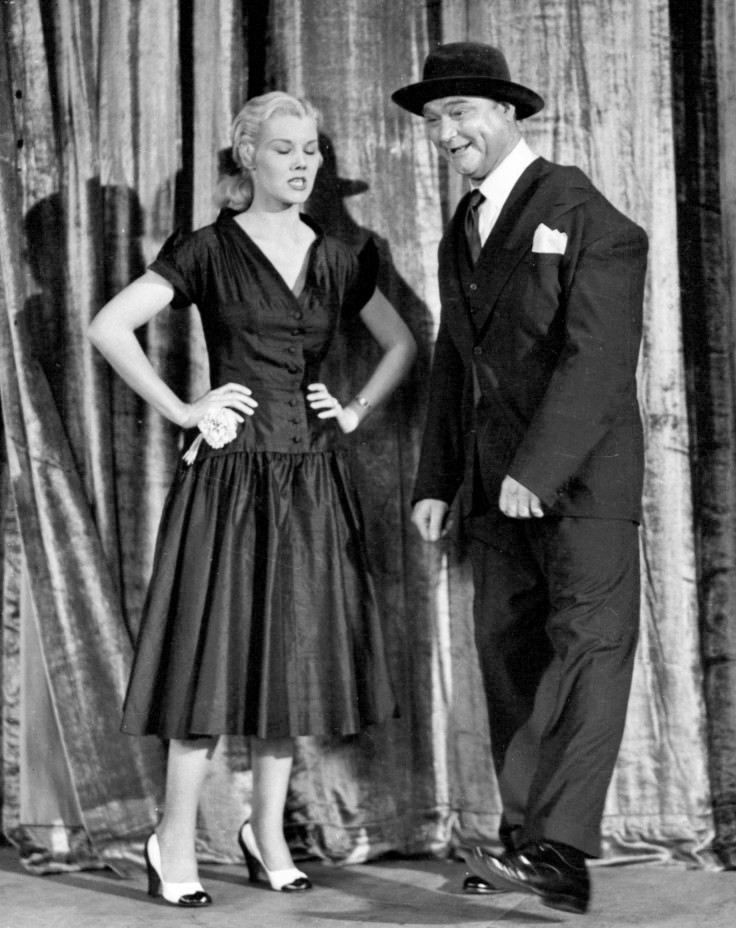
Knoch with Red Skelton on The Red Skelton Show in 1954

In 1946, Knoch signed a new contract with Paramount. She participated in the Paramount Starlet School, which included lessons in calisthenics, dancing, diction, and dramatics. Films in which she appeared included Variety Girl, The Blue Dahlia, Blue Skies, The Emperor's Waltz, Incendiary Blond, The Lost Weekend, Miss Susie Slagle's, Road to Utopia, and Welcome Stranger. Her roles included dancer, maid, nurse, and show girl. In the film Cross My Heart, she was one of a group of specialty dancers, and she and June Harris performed an acrobatic act.

By 1947 Knoch had begun working with Albert Lane Television productions in addition to performing in films. She became a regular on Red Skelton's TV show. In 1952 Skelton called Knoch "one of the greatest natural comediennes of our time" and said she "has brought a lot of pure fun and pleasure to millions of people watching my NBC-TV show". Knoch's dumb blonde role on the show bothered her initially, but Skelton dismissed her concerns, pointing out that the important thing was that her role made people laugh. She came to accept the character and commented, "Marie Wilson hasn't done badly with her reputation as a dumb blonde, so why should I worry?"

In 1952, Modern Screen named Knoch as one of 15 Golden Key Girls, selected from hundreds of young women "for their talent, beauty and outstanding qualities of character". They were considered by the magazine's editors to be "worthy of future stardom."

After two years on the Skelton show, Knoch left so that she could have more time for personal appearances and other activities. Those activities included working with Steve Ellingson, who wrote do-it-yourself newspaper columns about building furniture and sold patterns for such items. Ellingson called Knoch "the handiest girl with a hammer and saw in Hollywood". She appeared in photographs that accompanied his articles, and she made personal appearances with him at trade shows.

She returned to acting in films, making Sabre Jet, The Bad and the Beautiful, Executive Suite, and Athena.

== Personal life ==
Knoch married Nicholas Cancellieri, the owner of a trucking company, in 1945. Knoch died on July 22, 1990 at the age of 67.
