= National Board of Review Awards 1954 =

Annual US film awards ceremony

26th National Board of Review Awards

December 20, 1954

The 26th National Board of Review Awards were announced on December 20, 1954.

== Top Ten Films ==
1. On the Waterfront
2. Seven Brides for Seven Brothers
3. The Country Girl
4. A Star Is Born
5. Executive Suite
6. The Vanishing Prairie
7. Sabrina
8. 20,000 Leagues Under the Sea
9. The Unconquered
10. Beat the Devil

== Top Foreign Films ==
1. Romeo and Juliet
2. The Heart of the Matter
3. Gate of Hell
4. Diary of a Country Priest
5. The Little Kidnappers
6. Genevieve
7. Beauties of the Night
8. Mr. Hulot's Holiday
9. The Detective
10. Bread, Love and Dreams

== Winners ==
- Best Film: On the Waterfront
- Best Foreign Film: Romeo and Juliet
- Best Actor: Bing Crosby (The Country Girl)
- Best Actress: Grace Kelly (The Country Girl, Dial M for Murder, Rear Window)
- Best Supporting Actor: John Williams (Sabrina, Dial M for Murder)
- Best Supporting Actress: Nina Foch (Executive Suite)
- Best Director: Renato Castellani (Romeo and Juliet)
