= Moto Guzzi Trialce =

Italian military motor three-wheeler 1939–1945

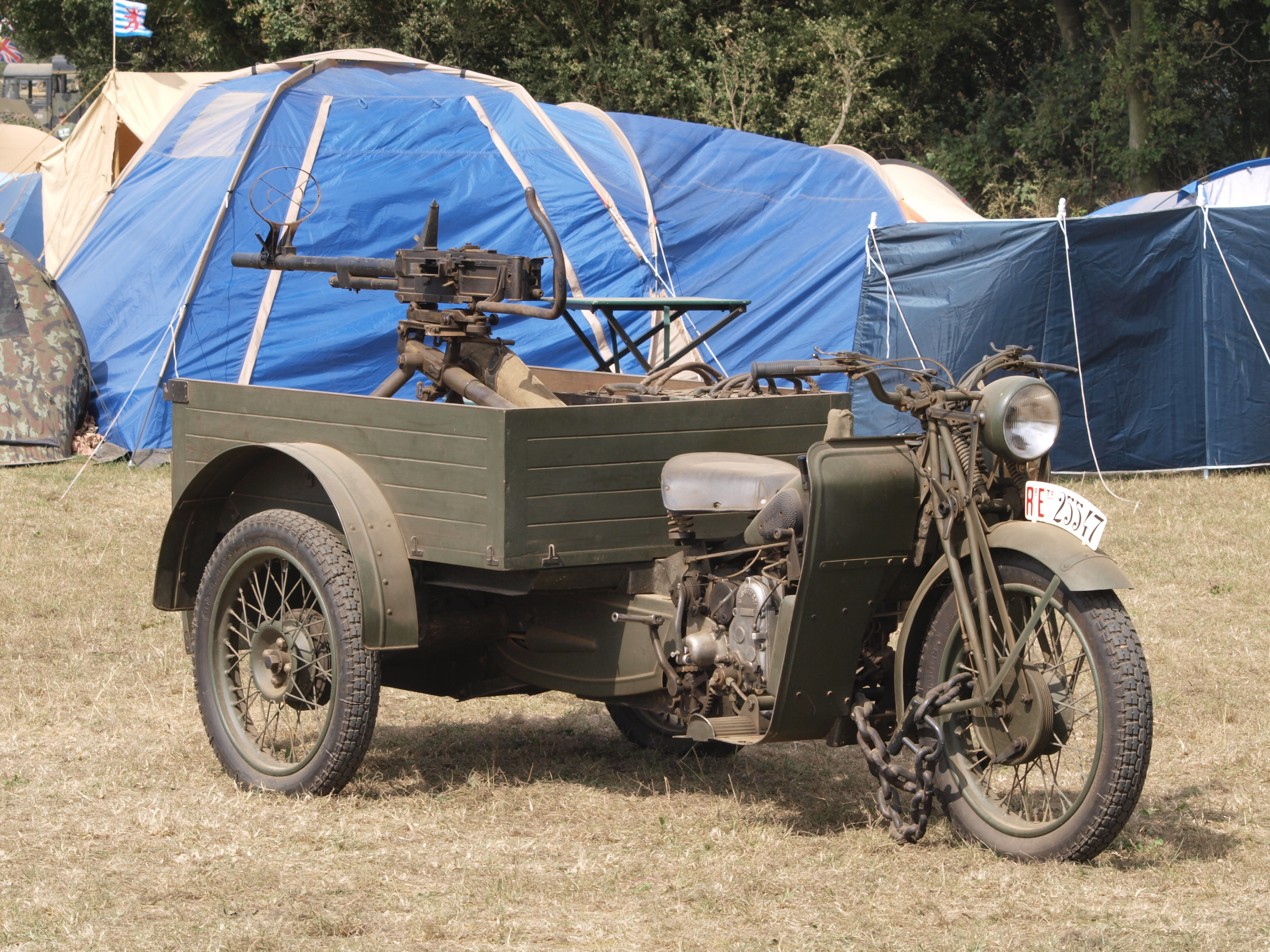
Moto Guzzi TriAlce

The Moto Guzzi 500 TriAlce is a three-wheeler Italian motorcycle built by Moto Guzzi between 1940 and 1943 for the armed forces.

== History ==
The Moto Guzzi Alce was first produced in 1939 to replace the Moto Guzzi GT 20, introduced the previous year and derived from the Moto Guzzi GT 17. They were used by the Milizia dellaStrada (National Road Militia) and the Italian African Police. During the Second World War they were extensively by the Royal Italian Army on all fronts in three versions, Monoposto (single-seat), Biposto (two-seat) and Attrezzata (sidecar combination).

Built in 1940, the TriAlce was a three-wheeler (or "motocarrello") military variant basing on mechanical components of the Alce, produced between 1940 and 1943 in 1741 copies. Along with the Benelli 500 M36 Mototriciclo, belonged to the category of "unified Tricar 500"; Indeed, the DM of August 9, 1941 required the standardization of "motorcycles, sidecars and motofurgoncini" to precise parameters, with a view to their seizure in case of war.

It was used in many different uses: personal transport, radio, support for machine guns 8 mm and guns 20/65 . Particularly important was his role in the motorization of riflemen regiments, such as the 3rd and the 6th Regiment riflemen of the Division "Celere" "Prince Amedeo Duca d'Aosta", used in Russia .

The TriAlce was the only means of motorized infantry division air-transportable 80th "La Spezia" . In this unit in particular was assigned, in 406 specimens, a removable version, for easy transport aircraft; of these, 79 specimens were assigned 80th Artillery Regiment of the division, for towing cannons 47/32, replaced after sending in Tunisia with 65/17 .

== Overview ==
The TriAlce took the front frame, the fork and the engine FTAA. The engine is a 498.4 cm^{3} single cylinder four-stroke with horizontal cylinder cast iron and fly outside, air-cooled and producing 13.2 hp at 4000 rpm. The power, in the fall, is guaranteed by the carburetor Dell'Orto MC 26 F. The transmission is the primary helical gear, the secondary roller chain, with gearbox 4-speed and multi-plate clutch in oil bath.

The rear part of the frame was modified with the installation of a frame with suspended axle on leaf springs and chain drive on the center differential. The frame supported a wooden box of 500 kg (1,100 lb) capacity size 1,300 mm × 960 mm × 350 mm (51 in × 38 in × 14 in). The bike is 2.825 m (9 ft 3.2 in) long and 1.05 m (3 ft 5 in) high. The track width is 1.12 m (3 ft 8 in) and the wheelbase is 1.88 m (6 ft 2 in). The dry weight is 336 kg (741 lb). The tank holds 13.5 litres (3.0 imperial gallons) of gasoline, with a range of 230 kilometres (140 miles). The Trialce has a top speed of 73.5 km/h (45.7 mph).

== See also ==
- Moto Guzzi Mulo
- Mototriciclo Guzzi 32
- Moto Guzzi Triporteurs
- List of motorized trikes
