= Executive Suite =

1954 MGM drama film directed by Robert Wise

- Directed by: Robert Wise
- Written by: Ernest Lehman
- Based on: Executive Suite by Cameron Hawley
- Produced by: John Houseman
- Starring: William Holden; June Allyson; Barbara Stanwyck; Fredric March; Walter Pidgeon; Shelley Winters; Paul Douglas; Louis Calhern; Dean Jagger; Nina Foch
- Narrated by: Chet Huntley
- Cinematography: George J. Folsey
- Edited by: Ralph E. Winters
- Production company: Metro-Goldwyn-Mayer
- Distributed by: Metro-Goldwyn-Mayer
- Release date: April 15, 1954 (Los Angeles)
- Running time: 103 minutes
- Country: United States
- Language: English
- Budget: $1.4 million
- Box office: $3.6 million

Executive Suite is a 1954 American drama film directed by Robert Wise and written by Ernest Lehman, and starring William Holden, June Allyson, Barbara Stanwyck, Fredric March, Walter Pidgeon, Shelley Winters, Paul Douglas, Louis Calhern, Dean Jagger, and Nina Foch. Based on the 1952 novel of the same name by Cameron Hawley, it depicts the internal struggle for control of a furniture manufacturing company after the unexpected death of the company's president. Executive Suite was nominated for multiple Academy Awards, including for Foch's performance, which earned a Best Supporting Actress nomination. The film won the Grand Jury Prize at the 15th Venice International Film Festival.

This was Lehman's first produced screenplay, and its plot deviates substantially from the novel. He went on to write Sabrina, North by Northwest, West Side Story, and other films. The film is one of few in Hollywood history without a musical score.

== Plot ==
In New York City to meet with investment bankers, Avery Bullard wires his secretary Erica to call an executive board meeting. He is the president and driving force of the Tredway Corporation, a major furniture manufacturer. A short commuter flight will get him there just in time. Hailing a taxi, however, he drops dead in the street. His wallet is stolen by a bystander.

George Caswell, a member of the Tredway board of directors and one of the financiers Bullard has just left, sees an ambulance in the street below, taking away a body he is sure is Bullard's. Seeing an opportunity for easy money, he phones his broker to sell as much Tredway stock as he can before the market closes for the weekend. He will buy it back after news of Bullard's death drops its price. But the coroner lists the body as a John Doe, and the lack of news makes Caswell very nervous: He cannot cover the trades unless the stock price falls.

Bullard never named a second-in-command after the previous executive vice-president died. When he fails to arrive at company headquarters, the meeting is canceled. The public announcement of his death later that evening—thanks to a tip from Caswell—sets off a scramble among the Tredway executives for the top job.

Company comptroller Loren Shaw immediately seizes power, making a swathe of unilateral decisions, from planning the funeral, issuing statements to the press, calling an emergency board meeting, and halting work on research vice president Don Walling's experimental line. He releases a favorable upcoming quarterly report to shore up stock prices. He is fixated on generating short-term accounting gains and using them to reward stockholders at the expense of the quality of the company's products and long-term viability. Shaw buys Caswell's vote by promising to sell him unissued company stock Caswell had begged for to cover his short sell. Shaw blackmails sales vice president Walter Dudley for his support after stalking him to a tryst with his secretary, Eva, that very evening.

Longtime treasurer Frederick Alderson seeks out Dudley for his vote, but is rebuffed. Young, idealistic vice president Walling throws his hat in the ring, convincing Alderson he is not too green. Alderson rushes to find vice president of manufacturing Jesse Grimm to secure his vote. A venerable 30-year Tredway veteran, Grimm had already decided to retire. While no fan of Shaw, he is envious and resentful of "boy wonder" Walling and refuses to support his candidacy.

Shaw gains the proxy of board member Julia Tredway, daughter of the company founder, major shareholder, and Bullard's jilted mistress. Grief-stricken and heartbroken, Julia wants the company out of her life after another traumatic abandonment by its leader: first by her father's suicide, then Bullard's rejection and death. Before Bullard's death is known, she tells Jesse of Caswell's offer to buy a large block of her stock, secretly. Walling confronts a distraught Miss Tredway in Bullard's office, where she is burning papers. She goes out on the balcony and steps up, but the bell makes her scream.

As the board begins their vote, Miss Tredway joins the meeting and tears up the proxy she gave Shaw, who falls one vote short of victory. Caswell holds out to gain leverage assured that Shaw will cover the secret stock purchase, which he cannot afford. Mary Walling comes to tell her husband that Grimm and Alderson are about to arrive and that she wants him to become the new company president.

Walling makes an impassioned speech, laying out his vision of a revitalized company driven by new construction methods and a return to quality products everyone can be proud of. Grimm, Dudley, and Julia Tredway are won over, and Walling is elected unanimously when Shaw concedes. As she leaves, Julia encourages Mary and asks her to tell Don that he saved her life. Don asks Mary who won their son's baseball game. She exclaims: "We did!"

== Cast ==
- William Holden as McDonald "Don" Walling, V.P. for Design and Development
- June Allyson as Mary Blemond Walling, wife of Don Walling
- Barbara Stanwyck as Julia O. Tredway, daughter and heir of Tredway's founder, and Bullard's mistress
- Fredric March as Loren Phineas Shaw, V.P. and Controller
- Walter Pidgeon as Frederick Y. Alderson, V.P. and Treasurer
- Shelley Winters as Eva Bardeman, secretary and mistress to Walter Dudley
- Paul Douglas as Josiah Walter Dudley, V.P. for Sales
- Louis Calhern as George Nyle Caswell, board member
- Dean Jagger as Jesse Q. Grimm, V.P. for Manufacturing
- Nina Foch as Erica Martin, secretary to Bullard and the Board of Directors
- Tim Considine as Mike Walling, son of Don Walling
- William Phipps as Bill Lundeen
- Lucille Knoch as Mrs. George Nyle Caswell
- Edgar Stehli as Julius Steigel
- Mary Adams as Sara Asenath Grimm, wife of Jesse Grimm
- Virginia Brissac as Edith Alderson, wife of Fred Alderson
- Harry Shannon as Ed Benedeck
- Raoul Freeman as Avery Bullard
- Chet Huntley as narrator (introduction)

== Production ==
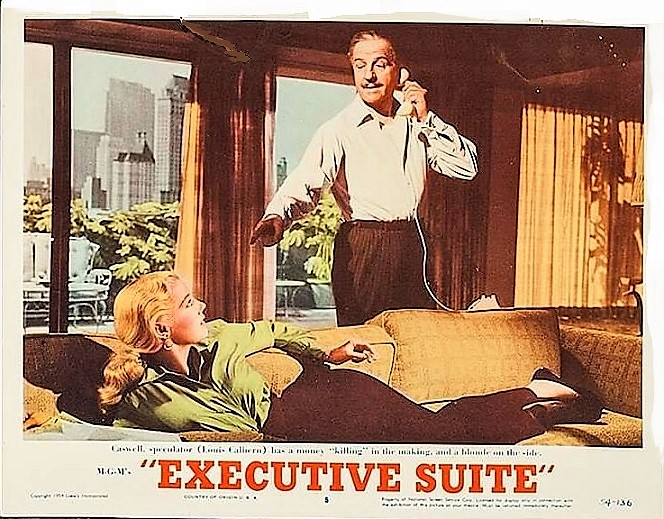
Lobby card with Louis Calhern as George Caswell, with Lucille Knoch

Dore Schary, the head of production for Metro-Goldwyn-Mayer (MGM), originally intended to produce Executive Suite himself, but turned it over to John Houseman because he was preoccupied. Schary intended for the film to have no musical score, using only diegetic sounds such as bells, sirens, and the roar of traffic.

Executive Suite was the first film written by journalist Ernest Lehman, and made for MGM by director Robert Wise.

The all-star cast created problems in scheduling, since only a handful of the lead actors were under contract to MGM. The logistics of scheduling were so complex that the studio had to set an "inflexible" starting date two months in advance of shooting, the first time that MGM had ever done so.

The film originally planned to have a total of 145 speaking parts, a record for MGM but ended with just 66 actors listed in the credits with far fewer having speaking roles. The film's budget was $1,383,000.

=== Locations ===
- Pennsylvania Power and Light Building (AKA: PPL Building), Allentown, Pennsylvania (Treadway Tower in the fictional Millburgh, Pennsylvania)
- Continental Bank Building, Manhattan, New York City, New York (Steigel office)
- Pacific Mutual Building, Los Angeles, California (Steigel building interiors)
- Long Beach Airport, Long Beach, California (Millburgh Airport)

== Release ==
MGM premiered Executive Suite in Hollywood on April 15, 1954. Its U.S. release expanded on April 30, 1954.

=== Home media ===
Warner Bros. Home Entertainment released Executive Suite on DVD on October 30, 2007, as part of the multi-film set Barbara Stanwyck: The Signature Collection. The Warner Archive Collection later issued a standalone DVD on May 29, 2013. On June 24, 2025, the Warner Archive Collection released the film for the first time on Blu-ray.

== Reception ==
=== Box office ===
Executive Suite was number one at the U.S. box office for four consecutive weeks during May 1954, grossing $1,845,000. According to MGM records, the film eventually earned theatrical rentals of $2,682,000 in the U.S. and Canada, and $903,000 in other markets, for a worldwide total of $3,585,000 and a profit of $772,000.

=== Critical reaction ===
Variety noted the overall enthusiastic reviews: "In nearly all keys [key cities] the pic has drawn enthusiastic crix [critics'] approval. This has helped considerably in smaller cities where reviews are followed faithfully." William Brogdon of Variety praised the film for its ensemble cast, and also wrote favorably of Lehman's adaptation of the source novel, stating he "has fashioned it into screen form as a dramatically interesting motion picture humanizing big business and its upper echelon personalities."

Bosley Crowther, writing in The New York Times, called it "[A] pretty chilly succession of echoing rooms", and commented that "for all of Mr. Holden's fine oration the ideal of stouter furniture and a happier furniture corporation doesn't cause the blood to run hot." Crowther however praised the "quality production and general quality acting of the film", and called it "a fair endeavor" but notes that "dramatically, it doesn't add up."

Edwin Schallert of the Los Angeles Times called the film's tension "well-sustained" and praised the performances of Stanwyck, Foch, Calhern, and Pidgeon. Harrison's Reports wrote: "It is a quality production, expertly directed and finely acted, but as a dramatic offering it seems more suited to the classes than to the masses." In January 1955, Fortune magazine published a four-page article, "The Executive as Hero", which praised the film, commenting that it "has set in motion the conflicts and collisions that give business its true drama."

On the review aggregator website Rotten Tomatoes, 100% of 12 critics' reviews are positive, with an average rating of 8/10.

=== Accolades ===
Award	Category	Nominee(s)	Result	Ref.
Academy Awards	Best Supporting Actress	Nina Foch	Nominated	
Academy Awards	Best Art Direction – Black-and-White	Art Direction: Cedric Gibbons and Edward Carfagno; Set Decoration: Edwin B. Willis and Emile Kuri	Nominated	
Academy Awards	Best Cinematography – Black-and-White	George Folsey	Nominated	
Academy Awards	Best Costume Design – Black-and-White	Helen Rose	Nominated	
British Academy Film Awards	Best Film from any Source		Nominated	
British Academy Film Awards	Best Foreign Actor	Fredric March	Nominated	
Directors Guild of America Awards	Outstanding Directorial Achievement in Motion Pictures	Robert Wise	Nominated	
National Board of Review Awards	Top Ten Films		5th Place	
National Board of Review Awards	Best Supporting Actress	Nina Foch	Won	
Venice International Film Festival	Golden Lion	Robert Wise	Nominated	
Venice International Film Festival	Grand Jury Prize	The Acting Ensemble	Won	
Writers Guild of America Awards	Best Written American Drama	Ernest Lehman	Nominated	

== TV series ==
More than two decades after their release, the film and novel were adapted into a weekly television series with the same title. Airing on CBS in 1976–1977, the TV version changed the fictional corporate setting to the Cardway Corporation in Los Angeles. Mitchell Ryan starred as company chairman Dan Walling, with Sharon Acker as his wife Helen and Leigh McCloskey and Wendy Phillips as his children, Brian and Stacey. Other series regulars included Stephen Elliott, Byron Morrow, Madlyn Rhue, William Smithers, Paul Lambert, Richard Cox, Trisha Noble, Carl Weintraub, Maxine Stuart, and Ricardo Montalbán.

Scheduling opposite Monday Night Football on ABC, and then The Rockford Files on NBC, doomed the show to poor ratings, and it was canceled after one season.
