= Moto Guzzi Triporteurs =

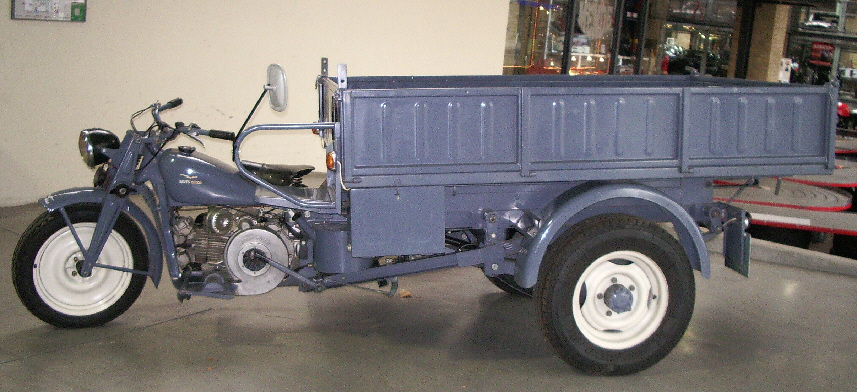

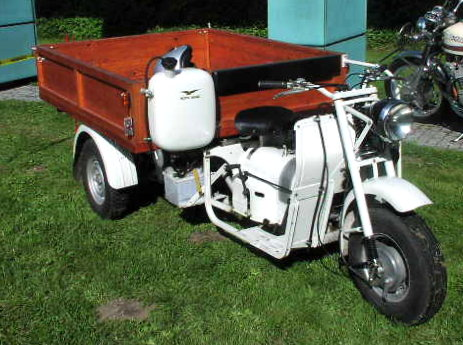

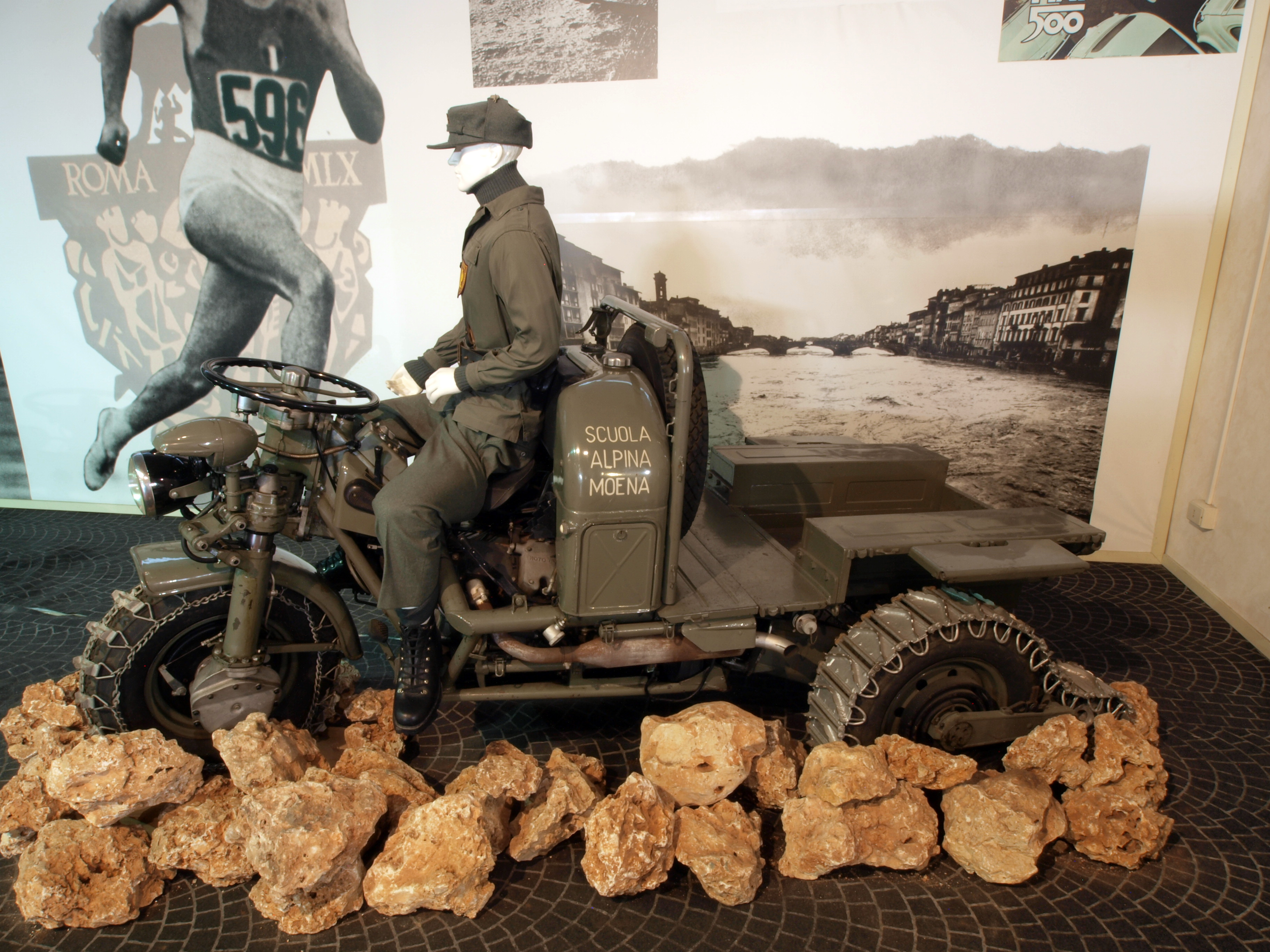

The Moto Guzzi Triporteurs were wheeled transport motorcycles (triporteurs) of the Moto Guzzi brand. In Italy, they are called "motocarri".

The Moto Guzzi had the advantage that their cargo sat behind the driver. This allowed the cargo to be stacked high without obstructing the view. In addition, the steering was slightly heavier when the machine was loaded. During and after the Second World War, motocarri were designed with specific military tasks in mind.

== Models ==
=== Motocarro Typo 107 ===
In 1928 the first model appeared: the Typo 107. The entire front was a Moto Guzzi Sport, where a frame was screwed. The machine could be quickly converted to a regular motorcycle. The Style 107 with no trailer cost 8,150 lira, those with a trailer cost 8,600 lira.

==== Engine ====
Like the Sport, the Style 107 had an engine block, with an engine and gearbox, a common sump and lubrication system. It was a head / side valve engine. Normally, such an engine was used in the overhead valve as inlet valve, and the side door as an outlet. But the outlet had the greatest need for cooling wind, so he fitted his lying to OHV engine this cover. It was operated by a push rod and a rocker arm. The inlet valve was driven by a simple tappet. The cast iron cylinder had lengthwise cooling ribs. The piston had four rings, plus another two oil rings. Therefore, the oil could remain within bounds. Because of the direction of rotation of the motor (backwards) the crankshaft pitched the oil splash lubrication up against the top of the cylinder rather than directly back into the oil pan. Gravity took care of the lubrication of the rest of the cylinder wall. The machine had an oil return pump that sat on the crankcase and the oil from the crankcase carried back to the tank, which was just below the fuel tank in the wind. Therefore, an automatic dry-sump system formed. The fuel supply was by Amac. It used a semi-automatic slide carburetor and on the steering wheel sat throttles for the gas and the choke.

==== Powertrain ====
The drivetrain matched those of the Sport, using a primary drive with gears, a wet multi-plate clutch, a three-speed gearbox and a chain to the rear wheel. That chain was long, and used a support gear with a tensioning device. The rear brake was a pedal-operated brake band.

==== Chassis ====
The engine frame was welded in one piece. Sport had no front brake, but the motocarro had a drum brake on the front wheel. The front suspension consisted of a Girdervork with a central helical spring without damping. The "frame" was a simple structure consisting of two box girders that ran from the engine to the rear axle and frame were supported by two tubes from the seatpost. Above the rear axle, two leaf spring assemblies mounted, which does not afveerden the engine, but the container does.

=== Motocarro Sport 14 ===
When the Moto Guzzi Sport 14 came on the market in 1929, the transport tricycle was fitted with its parts. The introduction of the Sport 14 happened by a gradual evolution of the "Sport".

=== Mototriciclo 32 and Motocarro 109-32 ===
The Mototriciclo 32 came from a military command triporteurs delivered to the Italian army. In order to increase maneuverability, the wheelbase was slightly smaller, as was the track width. The technique came from the Sport 15, which in 1931 had been launched, with the exception of the magneto (Marelli instead of Bosch), probably because the army did not want to be dependent on foreign suppliers, and greater fuel capacity. 935 copies were delivered to the army, but 143 units were sold to citizens under the type name motocarro 109–32.

=== P 250 Prototype ===
When the P 250 came on the market in 1934, Moto Guzzi also built a Triporteur based on this model, which had the 232 cc engine. Technically, there was no difference with the other models. The front was P 250, the back had a trailer with leaf springs. The prototype P 250 could be provided with a closed container to which a canvas roof for the driver was confirmed. In addition, that could be protected by a touring windscreen, a canvas cover and leg shields. It never reached production.

=== Motocarro S ===
In 1934 the Moto Guzzi S series launched with the head / side valve engine of the Sport 15 and the four- speed gearbox from the Moto Guzzi V-Series. Since the drive now appeared to be that of the S-series. the vehicle was named "Motocarro S". However, the machine was modernized, with a rear differential, the gearbox had to choose three or four gears with one reverse. The payload increased to 800 kg. The rear axle was disc wheels.

==== ER ====
In 1938, the motocarro was provided with the overhead valve of the Moto Guzzi V-Series. It had three forward gears and one reverse, and three drum brakes. The payload increased to 1,000 kg. The loose chassis cost 9,800 lire, the complete Triporteur with building cost 10,400 lire.

=== Tipo U ===
The Tipo U 1942 was an improved version of the ER, built to government requirements. It received forced air cooling with a fan, but without the usual wind tunnel around the cylinder. In addition, a reduction stage was in the final drive, allowing a high and low gearing. In combination with the three-speed gearbox were two shipments in the final reduction 3 x 2 = 6 forward gears and 1 x 2 = 2 reverse gears on. The fork and chassis was reinforced. The payload increased to more than 1,000 kg.

=== Ercole ===
Ercole appeared in 1946 and remained in production until 1980. This model was more heavily built than its predecessors, and because of its increasing load capacity, it was fitted with additional transmission bevel gears behind the gearbox. Its V-Series engine had five forward gears and one reverse. The engine had forced air cooling. Payload reached 1,500 kg. Later versions had the engine of Moto Guzzi Falcone and an electric starter . As of 1960, one a cab mount was available, but unlike the "Edile", no chair. The cabin was just placed on the motorcycle. This should have been a cabin, because the engine noise was now reinforced by the cabin. Although broad shields were mounted next to the engine (up to the doors), water and mud could just penetrate. The brake system was hydraulic as was a kipinstallatie that by hand or - at extra cost - could be operated hydraulically.

=== Edile ===
Although Edile, which came on the market with Ercole in 1946, resembled a normal motocarro with a built cabin, the structure was completely different. The chassis consisted of a large central box beam that conveyed the steering head to the rear. The driver sat on the right side of the cabin, the engine (the usual 500 cc single cylinder) was in the center, combined with Ercole's five-speed gearbox with reverse gear. Control was carried out by a steering wheel via a strong and simple fork clerk. Also, the front wheel was a car wheel. The cabin held a spare tire. The Edile had no front or rear suspension. The cabin had no doors. The gear ratios were very close together because the speed was about 25 km / h. The Edile was meant to be more like a car. The payload was 3600 kg. The Edile was not a success and production was discontinued in 1947.

=== Motocarro Ercolino ===
In 1956 the small motocarro Ercolino came with a 192 cc two-stroke engine of Moto Guzzi Galletto scooter. The engine was well adapted. Moreover, it had forced air cooling. The first model had 15-inch drive wheels behind and a 14" front wheel drive. In 1959, smaller 10" wheels were fitted. The Ercolino had a kickstarter, with an optional electric starter. Load capacity was 350 kg, but could be increased to 590 kg. The base price was 389,000 lire, but variants with a cabin could increase the price up to 489,000 lire.

=== Autoveicolo da Montagna 3 X 3 ===
At the end of the fifties Italian Ministry of Defence requested a vehicle for "Alpini" (mountain troops) who at that time used mules. It was suggested by General Ferruccio Garbari as project officer and included requirements such as: load capacity of 500 kg across all kinds of terrain, especially in mountainous areas and on narrow paths. The development was first placed in the hands of Antonio Micucci and later worked on by Soldavini and Giulio Cesare Carcano. Carcano had just introduced a new long mounted V-twin engine with forced air cooling. A 500 and a 650 cc version was intended for the Fiat 500, but Fiat withdrew from the project. Carcano saw his chance to find a use for his new engine. The "Mulo Meccanico" (Mechanical Mule) offered wheel drive and variable wheelbase and track width. The 754 cc engine produced just 20 hp, due to a low compression ratio that, reflected low quality fuel. However 47 Nm was achieved at 2,400 rpm. Only one 26mm Weber carburetor used and a waterproof coil - ignition were used. The chassis system consisted of tubes and pressed steel box sections. The rear suspension consisted of two box girder arms that were cushioned by rubber suspension. At the front was a one-sided telescopic fork with coil springs. Control was done with a steering wheel through bevel gears. The driver sat on a motorcycle seat, but operation was through levers and pedals as in a car. The engine sat behind the driver. Behind it was a manual gearbox with six forward gears and one reverse. A central differential with a teruglooppal prevented roll back. 20% of the drive went to the front wheel, 80% to the rear wheels. Rear-wheel drive was done with two drive shafts that went diagonally from the differential to the two wheels, the front-wheel drive went through a propeller shaft leading from the differential between the cylinders through to the steering head. Using three bevel gears, the drive at the steering led to another drive shaft, which powered the front wheel. In one aluminum cabinet were the gearbox, the differential and the device to adjust the track width. The rear drum brakes were hydraulic operated, while the drum brake at the front used a Bowden cable. Behind the rear wheels were tensioning rollers, where a short caterpillar could be mounted. The front fender left enough space for a snow chain. However the machine did not meet expectations. Traveling straight the machine could mount steep slopes, but sideways risked falling over, because of the three wheels. Mountain trails had very short turns or rocks enough to stop the mechanical donkey while a real donkey could proceed. Therefore, the Autoveicolo da Montagna was taken out of production in 1963.

=== AIACE ===
In 1962 the motocarro AIACE appeared as a cheap means of urban transport. It was equipped with the engine of Moto Guzzi Zigolo 110, a small tweetaktje. It had a cabin with no doors in front of the engine. Therefore, the drive could be made directly from the three-speed gearbox with integrated differential. A reverse gear was included. Motorcycle handlebars and a swing fork were used. The rear shock absorbers were hydraulic. Without cab and superstructure AIACE cost 164,000 lire, increasing to 243,000. It was not a success: in 1963, production was stopped.

==== Dingotre ====
The Dingotre appeared in 1965 and intended for light transport. However, it had a big advantage: its 50 cc engine required no driver license. The engine was under the driver's seat and was equipped with forced air cooling. The Dingotre had no cabin, but a few large leg shields so that it looked like the front edge of a scooter. A thick tube and chassis were used. It offered a large foot pedal, with three gears. At the front was a telescopic fork. The rear wheels were small leaf spring suspension. A chain delivered power to the rear wheels. No reverse gear was included. The Dingotre remained in production until 1968 and was succeeded by the Furghino. The Dingotre cost 151,000 lire as a kit and 210 500 complete.

=== Ciclocarro Furghino ===
The Furghino was produced from 1968 to 1971. It used the engine of the Dingotre, with forced air cooling, but it was now mounted further back and longitudinally. This allowed a shaft drive to be used and the block was outside the cab. As with the AIACE, which had no cab doors, it was less luxurious than, for example, a Piaggio Ape. The Furghino kit cost 293,000 lira and complete 339,000 lira.

== See also ==
- Motorized tricycle
- List of motorized trikes
- Moto Guzzi Trialce
