= Sandro Ghenzi =

Italian film producer

- Occupation: Producer
- Years active: 1942–1959 (film)

Sandro Ghenzi was an Italian film producer.

== Selected filmography ==
- The Materassi Sisters (1944)
- The Priest's Hat (1944)
- Under the Sun of Rome (1948)
- Two Cents Worth of Hope (1952)
- Romeo and Juliet (1954)

== Bibliography ==
- Anile, Alberto. Orson Welles in Italy. Indiana University Press, 2013.
