= 1927 in New Zealand =

- Decades: 1900s; 1910s; 1920s; 1930s; 1940s
- See also: History of New Zealand; List of years in New Zealand; Timeline of New Zealand history

The following lists events that happened during 1927 in New Zealand.

== Population ==
- Estimated population as of 31 December: 1,450,400
- Increase since previous 31 December 1926: 20,700 (1.45%)
- Males per 100 females: 104.3

== Incumbents ==
=== Regal and viceregal ===
- Head of state – George V
- Governor-General – Sir Charles Fergusson

=== Government ===
The 22nd New Zealand Parliament continued. Government was by the Reform Party with a strong majority, and with the Labour and Liberal parties in opposition.

- Speaker of the House – Charles Statham (Independent)
- Prime Minister – Gordon Coates (Reform)
- Minister of Finance – William Downie Stewart (Reform)
- Minister of Foreign Affairs – William Nosworthy (Reform)
- Attorney-General – Frank Rolleston (Reform)
- Chief Justice – Sir Charles Skerrett

=== Parliamentary opposition ===
- Leader of the Opposition – Harry Holland (Labour).

=== Main centre leaders ===
- Mayor of Auckland – George Baildon
- Mayor of Wellington – Charles Norwood, succeeded by George Troup
- Mayor of Christchurch – John Archer
- Mayor of Dunedin – Harold Tapley, succeeded by William Taverner

== Events ==
- 22 February – 22 March: Royal tour by the Duke and Duchess of York

== Arts and literature ==
See 1927 in art, 1927 in literature, Category:1927 books

=== Music ===
See: 1927 in music

=== Radio ===
See: Public broadcasting in New Zealand

=== Film ===
- Carbine's Heritage
- The Te Kooti Trail
- Under the Southern Cross

See: Category:1927 film awards, 1927 in film, List of New Zealand feature films, Cinema of New Zealand, Category:1927 films

== Sport ==
=== Badminton ===
- The New Zealand Badminton Federation, now Badminton New Zealand, is founded and the first National Championships are held, at Wanganui.
  - Men's singles: R. Creed-Meredith
  - Women's singles: E. Hetley
  - Men's doubles: R. Creed-Meredith and M. Fell
  - Women's doubles: E. Hetley and N. Wanklyn
  - Mixed doubles: R. Creed-Meredith and E. Hetley

=== Chess ===
The 36th National Chess Championship was held in Auckland, and was won by A.W.O. Davies of Auckland, his third title.

=== Golf ===
- The 17th New Zealand Open championship was won by Ernie Moss.
- The 31st National Amateur Championships were held in Hamilton
  - Men: Sloan Morpeth (Maungakiekie) – 2nd title
  - Women: Mrs ? Collinson

=== Horse racing ===
==== Harness racing ====
- New Zealand Trotting Cup – Kohara
- Auckland Trotting Cup – Ahuriri

==== Thoroughbred racing ====
- New Zealand Cup – Rapier
- Avondale Gold Cup – Te Kara
- Auckland Cup – Rapier
- Wellington Cup – Rapier
- New Zealand Derby – Agrion

=== Lawn bowls ===
The national outdoor lawn bowls championships are held in Auckland.

- Men's singles champion – H.C. Clarke (Rocky Nook Bowling Club)
- Men's pair champions – A. Brakebush, M. Walker (skip) (Auckland Bowling Club)
- Men's fours champions – J. McMillan, H. Rowling, J.F. Wright, A.H. Benefield (skip) (St John's Bowling Club, Wanganui)

=== Rugby ===
- 1926–27 New Zealand Māori rugby union tour

Category:Rugby union in New Zealand Category:All Blacks Ranfurly Shield

=== Rugby league ===
New Zealand national rugby league team

=== Shooting ===
- Ballinger Belt – Douglas Roots (Patea)

=== Soccer ===
- 1927 Chatham Cup won by Ponsonby
- Canada toured New Zealand, playing a series of four internationals which they won 2–1.
  - 25 June, Dunedin: Draw 2–2
  - 2 July, Christchurch: NZ 1–2 Canada
  - 9 July, Wellington: NZ 1–0 Canada
  - 23 July, Auckland: NZ 1–4 Canada
- Provincial league champions:
  - Auckland: Thistle
  - Canterbury: Nomads
  - Hawke's Bay: Napier Rangers
  - Nelson: Athletic
  - Otago: Northern
  - South Canterbury: Rangers
  - Southland: Corinthians
  - Taranaki: Caledonian
  - Waikato: Waihou
  - Wanganui: Eastbrooke
  - Wellington: YMCA

== Births ==
=== January ===
- 4 January – Patrick Hanan, historian of Chinese literature
- 7 January – Mary Batchelor, politician
- 8 January – Sidney Moko Mead, anthropologist, historian, Māori leader
- 9 January – Ken English, rugby league player
- 11 January
  - Johnny Hayes, cricketer
  - John Tanner, rugby union player
- 12 January
  - Maurice Marshall, athlete
  - Emily Schuster, master weaver
- 14 January – Vera Burt, cricketer
- 20 January – Cyril Paskell, rugby league player
- 22 January – Jack Doms, swimmer

=== February ===
- 2 February – Whatumoana Paki, Kīngitanga elder
- 3 February – Graham Mexted, rugby union player
- 6 February – Thomas Wells, cricketer, schoolteacher
- 9 February – Walter Brown, actor
- 12 February – John Todd, businessman, philanthropist
- 16 February – Des White, rugby league player
- 18 February – Hugh Kawharu, academic, Ngāti Whātua leader
- 20 February – Allan Wild, architect, academic
- 24 February – Jim Edwards, politician
- 27 February – Peter Whittle, mathematician, statistician

=== March ===
- 2 March – Ray Farman, cricketer
- 3 March – Bruce Tabb, accountancy academic
- 9 March – Dave Leech, hammer thrower
- 13 March
  - Thea Muldoon, wife of Robert Muldoon
  - Albert Putt, cricketer
- 14 March – Tim Besley, civil engineer, businessman, public servant
- 17 March – Christopher Small, sociomusicologist
- 24 March – John Head, schoolteacher, anti-landmine campaigner
- 31 March – Pat Hond, police officer, teacher, soldier, community worker

=== April ===
- 5 April
  - Neil Anderson, naval officer
  - Eddie Robinson, rugby union player
- 6 April – Barney Clarke, boxer
- 9 April – Tiny Hill, rugby union player and selector
- 13 April – George Chapman, accountant, businessman, politician
- 14 April – Alan MacDiarmid, Nobel laureate chemist
- 15 April – Joan Talbot, fashion designer and retailer
- 18 April – Stanley Callagher, rowing coxswain
- 20 April – Douglas J. Martin, Mormon leader
- 21 April – Tom Logan, water polo player, swimmer, surf lifesaver, dentist, naval officer

=== May ===
- 1 May
  - Pat Downey, lawyer and public servant
  - Duncan McMullin, jurist
- 8 May – Gray Nelson, public servant, diplomat
- 9 May – Gerry Clark, sailor, writer and ornithologist
- 17 May – Jacqueline Sturm, poet and short-story writer
- 20 May – Donald Coleman, cricketer
- 22 May – Eric Petrie, cricketer
- 23 May – Jack Cropp, sailor
- 25 May – Helen Smith, politician
- 26 May – John Worrall, cricketer

=== June ===
- 1 June – John O'Brien, rower
- 4 June – William Fyfe, geochemist
- 5 June – Bill McLennan, rugby league player
- 8 June – Bob Walls, painter
- 15 June – Roland Avery, rugby league referee
- 16 June
  - Kate Harcourt, actor
  - Trevor Redmond, speedway rider
- 20 June – Bill Bradfield, amateur astronomer
- 27 June – Brian Brake, photographer

=== July ===
- 9 July – Joyce Fenton, fencer
- 10 July
  - Ken Deas, cricketer
  - Peter Eastgate, rugby union player
- 18 July
  - Zin Harris, cricketer
  - Jack Sutherland, athlete
- 19 July – Ray Harper, rugby union player and administrator
- 20 July – Tom Lynch, rugby union and rugby league player
- 25 July
  - James Belich, politician, mayor of Wellington
  - Dorothy Fletcher, historian

=== August ===
- 19 August – John Caselberg, writer
- 25 August – Keith Cumberpatch, field hockey player
- 26 August
  - Jill Amos, local-body politician, community leader
  - Bill McCaw, rugby union player
- 30 August – Humphrey Gould, rower, businessman
- 31 August – Reg King, association footballer

=== September ===
- 1 September – Myra Larcombe, police officer, historian, and swimming coach
- 9 September – John Hickman, meteorologist
- 14 September – John Hall-Jones, historian, otolaryngologist
- 22 September – Peter Burke, rugby union player, coach and administrator
- 27 September – Te Uruhina McGarvey-Tiakiwai, Māori cultural leader

=== October ===
- 9 October
  - Bob Goslin, boxer
  - Ron Trotter, businessman
- 11 October – Leonard Watson, cricketer
- 22 October – Wally Clark, zoologist
- 24 October – Ian Monro, naval officer
- 30 October – Jill McDonald, children's writer and illustrator

=== November ===
- 7 November – Brian Finlay, rugby union player
- 15 November – Wallace (Bill) Rowling, politician, 30th Prime Minister of New Zealand
- 18 November
  - Giovanni Cataldo, fisherman, search and rescue organiser
  - Pat Creedy, rugby union and rugby league player
- 19 November – Thomas Engel, rower
- 21 November – Peter Mulgrew, mountaineer, sailor, businessman
- 24 November
  - Geoff Mardon, speedway rider
  - Kevin Skinner, rugby union player
- 25 November – Alison Preston-Thomas, netball player

=== December ===
- 1 December – John Branthwaite, Anglican priest
- 2 December – Les Hunter, politician
- 4 December – Peter Hall, cricketer
- 6 December – Alan Gilbertson, cricketer
- 8 December
  - David Hay, cardiologist, anti-smoking campaigner
  - Hamish Hay, politician, mayor of Christchurch
- 10 December – Graham Gordon, general practitioner and surgeon
- 18 December – Rom Harré, philosopher, psychologist
- 19 December – Robert Couper, cricketer
- 23 December – Pat Sheahan, rugby union player, publican, publisher
- 30 December – John Pring, rugby union referee

=== Exact date unknown ===
- Colin Franklin, electrical engineer
- Rusty Robertson, rowing coach

== Deaths ==
=== January–March ===
- 4 January
  - Herbert Drewitt, World War I flying ace (born 1895)
  - Joseph Ward, astronomer (born 1862)
- 13 January
  - Frank S. Anthony, author (born 1891)
  - John Fisher, politician (born 1837)
- 21 January – Kiti Karaka Rīwai, Māori tribal leader (born 1870)
- 26 January – Robert Wellwood, farmer, auctioneer, commission agent, politician (born 1836)
- 29 January – Sir Henry Brett, journalist, newspaper proprietor, writer, politician, mayor of Auckland (1877–78) (born 1843)
- 21 February – Thomas Ryan, rugby union player, artist, steamer captain (born 1864)
- 17 March – Bella MacCallum, botanist, mycologist (born 1886)
- 26 March – Edward Withy, shipbuilder, politician (born c.1844)
- 31 March – David Guthrie, politician (born 1856)

=== April–June ===
- April – T. T. Rawhiti, Kīngitanga secretary and administrator
- 4 April – Cuthbert Cowan, politician (born 1835)
- 6 April – Elsie Reeve, jeweller (born 1885)
- 8 April – John O'Donovan, police commissioner (born 1858)
- 14 April – James Wilson, politician (born 1865)
- 26 April – William Jolliffe, film censor (born 1851)
- 28 April – Sarah Featon, botanical artist (born 1848)
- 2 May – Eden George, photographer, politician, mayor of Christchurch (1892–93) (born 1863)
- 1 June
  - Thomas Andrew, cricketer (born 1927)
  - Sir Worley Edwards, jurist (born 1850)
- 11 June
  - John Ormsby, land negotiator and commissioner, politician (born 1854)
  - Hōne Taare Tīkao, Ngāi Tahu leader, scholar, politician (born 1850)
- 17 June – Lake Ayson, acclimatisation officer, fisheries inspector (born 1855)

=== July–September ===
- 18 July – Eustace Ferguson, pathologist, entomologist (born 1884)
- 24 July – Arthur Harvey, doctor (born 1866)
- 27 July – Newton King, auctioneer, merchant, businessman (born 1855)
- 5 August – Thomas Groube, cricketer (born 1857)
- 7 August – Frank Mace, soldier (born 1837)
- 11 August – Edmond Slattery, swagger, rural labourer (born c.1839)
- 25 August – Richard Bollard, politician (born 1863)
- 3 September – Bill Cunningham, rugby union player (born 1874)
- 30 September – Edmund Taylor, temperance advocate, politician (born 1855)

=== October–December ===
- 9 October – Charles Mules, Anglican bishop (born 1837)
- 12 October – Louis Fowler, cricketer (born 1865)
- 12 November – John Aris, cricketer (born 1843)
- 17 November – Charlie Smyth, police officer, trade unionist, baker (born 1883)
- 21 November – Oscar Alpers, journalist, poet, lawyer, jurist (born 1867)
- 26 November – Percy Gates Morgan, geologist, science administrator (born 1867)
- 28 November – Charles Lewis, politician (born 1857)
- 8 December – Robert Allan, businessman, manufacturer (born 1847)
- 18 December – Hugh Finn, politician (born 1847)

== See also ==
- History of New Zealand
- List of years in New Zealand
- Military history of New Zealand
- Timeline of New Zealand history
- Timeline of New Zealand's links with Antarctica
- Timeline of the New Zealand environment
