= Shiner =

Shiner or The Shiner may refer to:

== Entertainment and media ==
- Shiner (2000 film), a 2000 film with Michael Caine
- Shiner (2004 film), a 2004 film by Christian Calson
- ”The Shiner” is a Season 3 episode of American animated televisions series Recess
- Shiner (band), a band from Kansas City
- Shiners, the fireflies in The Underland Chronicles
- Shiner (comics), fictional character in the UK comic Whizzer and Chips
- Shining With The Shiner and Shiner Slattery, books by John A. Lee in which Edmond Slattery (see below) is a central character

== Food and drink ==
- Shiner beer, a brand of beer brewed in the Spoetzl Brewery of Shiner, Texas
- Shiner, slang for moonshine, a high-proof corn-based alcohol spirit, or a person who produces such spirit

== People ==
- Shiner (surname)
- "The Shiner", the nickname of early New Zealand itinerant worker Edmond Slattery

== Places ==
- Shiner, Texas

== Other ==
- Shiner (fish), common name used for any of several kinds of small, usually silvery fish
- Shiner (Ottawa), a street gang of Irish immigrants in Bytown during the early 19th century
- Shiner, slang for a black eye (a periorbital hematoma)
  - The Young Lady with the Shiner, 1953 painting by Norman Rockwell
- Shiner, the internal codename for the Apple Network Server
