= Reginald King (disambiguation) =

Reginald King (1869–1955) was a solicitor politician in Queensland, Australia.

Reginald King can also refer to:

- Carlos Reginald King (born 1979), CEO of television production company, Kingdom Reign Entertainment.
- Reginald Arthur King (1927–2009), New Zealand soccer player.
- Reginald Brooks-King (1861–1938), Welsh archer.
- Reginald Claude McMahon King (1904–1991), British composer and conductor, creator of Reginald King and his Orchestra
- Reggie King (also known as Reginald Biddings King; born 1957), retired American professional basketball player.
- Reg King (1945–2010), English musician and songwriter.
