= Arthur Worthington =

Arthur Worthington may refer to:

- Arthur Bentley Worthington, (died 1917) American-born Australasian alternative religious leader, bigamist and fraudster
- Arthur Mason Worthington, (1852–1916) English physicist and educator
- Arthur Norreys Worthington, (1862–1912) Canadian physician, surgeon, soldier, and politician
