= Robert Walls (disambiguation) =

Robert Walls (1950–2025) was an Australian rules footballer.

Robert Walls may also refer to:

- Robert Walls (politician) (1884–1953), New Zealand politician
- Robert Walls (admiral) (1941–2023), officer of the Royal Australian Navy
- Robert E. Walls (born 1941), American politician in the Delaware House of Representatives
- Bob Walls (1927–1999), New Zealand painter
