= Branthwaite (surname) =

Branthwaite is a surname, and may refer to:

- Jarrad Branthwaite (born 2002), English footballer
- John Branthwaite (1927–2014), New Zealand priest
- William Branthwaite (died 1619), English scholar and translator
