= William Armour =

William Armour may refer to:

- Bill Armour (1869–1922), American baseball player and manager
- William Allan Armour (1880–1967), New Zealand school principal and educationalist
