= Colin Franklin =

Colin Franklin may refer to:

- Colin Franklin (engineer) (born 1927), engineer and physicist and in Canada's space programme
- Colin Franklin (bibliographer) (1923–2020), English writer and bibliographer
