= Napier Boys' High School =

Secondary boys' school in New Zealand

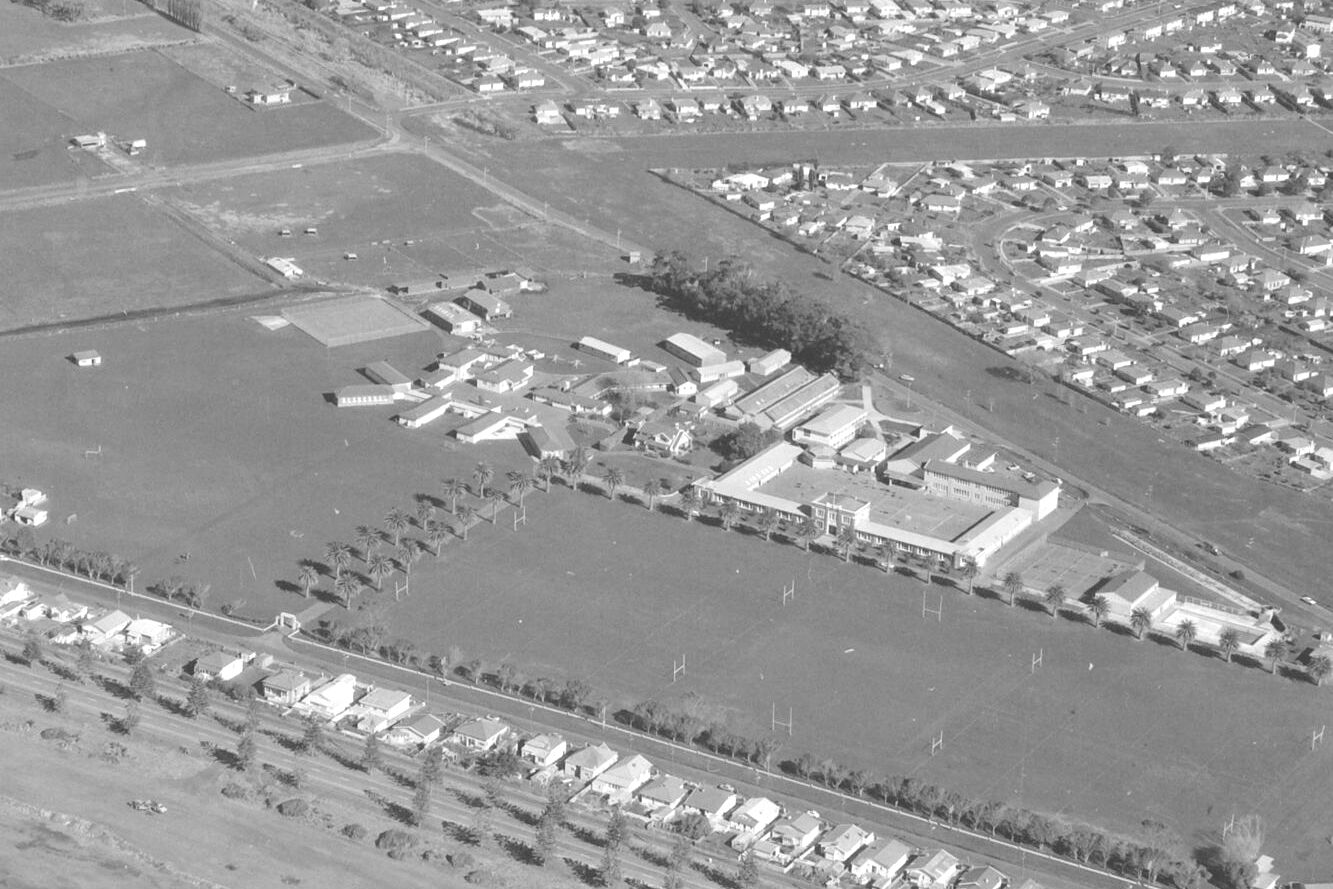
- 1972 aerial view

Location
- Chambers Street, Napier, New Zealand; 39.5145°S 176.9138°E

Information
- Type: Boys Secondary with boarding facilities
- Motto: Me Tika Te Mahi, Kia Mataara; Justum Perficito Nihil Timeto "Do Right and Fear Nothing"
- Established: 1872; 154 years ago
- Ministry of Education Institution no.: 216
- Headmaster: Simon Coe
- Teaching staff: ~80
- Gender: Male
- Enrolment: 1,296 (July 2026)
- Campus type: Urban
- Colours: Navy Blue & Sky Blue
- Socio-economic decile: 6N
- Website: nbhs.school.nz

Napier Boys' High School is a secondary boys' school in Napier, New Zealand. It currently has a school roll of approximately 1,296 pupils. The school provides education from Year 9 to Year 13.

== Headmasters ==
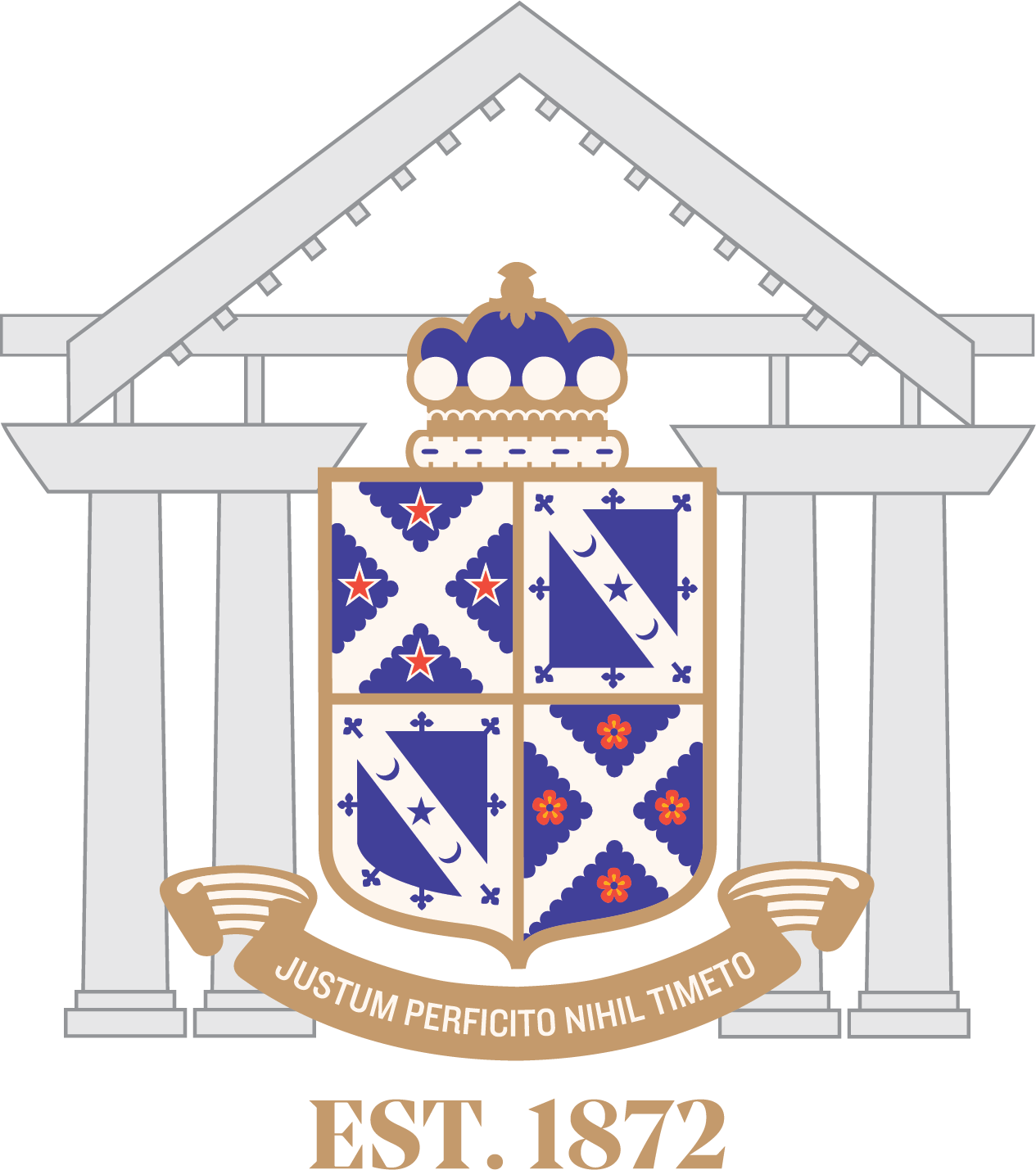
Unofficial crest of Napier Boys' High School

The following is a list of Napier Boys High School's Headmasters.

- Rev. John Campbell 1874-1884
- N. Neath 1884-1887
- W. M. Wood 1888-1902
- A. S. M. Polson 1902-1912
- F. Heaton 1913-1915
- William Allan Armour 1915–1927
- William Foster 1928–1953
- Hugh Henderson 1953–1963
- Darcy Caird 1964–1976
- Bruce Davie 1977–1993
- Mark Hensman 1993–1997
- Ross Brown 1997–2015
- Matt Bertram 2016–2021
- Jarred Williams 2021–2024
- Simon Coe 2024–Present

== Sport ==
The school is a part of the Super 8 school group and has an exchange programme with Wairarapa College. It also has a rugby exchange with Palmerston North Boys' High School, the Polson Banner.

== History ==
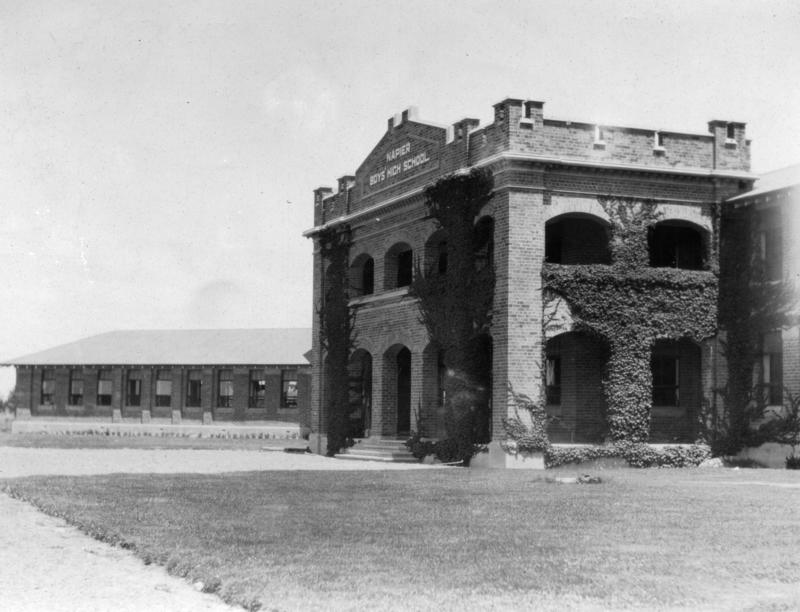
Scinde house in 1926. Courtesy of architect Frank L Moodie.

Napier Boys' High School was founded in 1872 and originally amalgamated with Napier Girls' High School on the 29 January 1884. Established 16 years after Nelson College, Napier Boys' High School remains one of the oldest schools in New Zealand. The school was previously located on Bluff hill. In 1927, Napier Boys' High School relocated to Te Awa for expansion space. In July 1915, William Allan Armour became the new headmaster. Armour revolutionized Napier Boys' High School's academic and sporting aspects. He established the school's credibility and public reputation. In 1928, Armour helped to redevelop the school's campus and to honour his commitment, 'A' block was named after him. After the Napier 1931 earthquake, Napier Technical College was disestablished by the minister of education and amalgamated into Napier Boys' High School and Napier Girls' High School. Much of the campus was also redeveloped in the Art Deco style. On the 20 November 1998, the Hawkes Bay [Harold] Holt Planetarium was built. On the 19 April 2002, chemistry teacher Reuben John Martin was arrested and charged for manufacturing Class A MDA, Class B MDMA, commonly known as ecstasy, and Class C TMAs. Martin pleaded guilty to drug manufacturing charges on the 11 August 2003 and was released in 2012.

== Campus ==
The school occupies a site of approximately 30 hectares.

The school's grounds accommodate four rugby and two soccer pitches in winter and eight grass cricket wickets in summer. The school has a swimming complex, a gymnasium, and home to the Hawkes Bay Holt Planetarium.

The boarding house (Scinde House) is located on-site, and accommodates 185 pupils.

== Notable alumni ==
=== Business ===
- Rod Drury – chief executive officer of Xero, accounting software
- Chris Tremain (born 1966) – real estate investor and entrepreneur

=== Arts ===
- John Psathas – internationally-acclaimed music composer

=== Public service ===
- Oscar Alpers (1867–1927) – Supreme Court judge
- Frank Corner (born 1920) – diplomat
- Cyril Harker (1899–1970) – National MP for Waipawa and Hawke's Bay (1940–1963)
- Sydney Jones (1894–1982) – National MP for Hastings (1949–1954)
- Arnold Reedy (1903–1971) – Māori leader
- Percy Storkey (1891–1969) – Victoria Cross recipient in an Australian unit
- Chris Tremain (born 1966) – MP for Napier (2005–2014)
- Stuart Nash – MP for Napier (2014–2023) and Minister of Police (2017–2023)
- Mahesh Muralidhar (born 1979) – National MP for Tāmaki (2026 to Present)

=== Religion ===
- Ralph Vernon Matthews – Bishop of Waiapu from 1979 to 1983
- John Bluck – Dean of ChristChurch Cathedral from 1990 to 2002, Bishop of Waiapu from 2002 to 2008

=== Sport ===
- Aidan Daly – basketball player in the NBL
- Chris Jackson – former New Zealand All Whites soccer captain
- Sam Jenkins – former New Zealand All Whites soccer player and New Zealand Olympian number 1050
- Mark Paston – former All Whites goalkeeper
- Puke Lenden – former basketball player in the NBL
- Jesse Ryder – Black Caps opener and amateur boxer
- Shayne O'Connor – former Black Caps fast bowler
- Jason Stewart – Olympic athlete (800m)
- Hubert McLean – All Black
- Greg Somerville – former All Black No. 991
- Zac Guildford – Crusaders and All Black winger
- Richard Turner – former All Black and rugby commentator
- Daniel Kirkpatrick – Wellington Lions and Hurricanes player
- Bryn Evans – All Black (#1090)
- Gareth Evans – All Black (#1179) and Hurricanes (number 8)
- Brad Weber – All Black (#1140) and Māori All Black and Captain Chiefs Halfback and Captain
- Tyrone Thompson – Maori All Black and Chiefs Hooker
- Jonty Elmes - New Zealand Black Sticks Forward
- Joe Ward – Hurricanes Wasps RFC England Saxons Hooker

=== Other ===
- Phil Lamason – WWII RNZAF bomber pilot
- Garth McVicar – founder and chairman of the Sensible Sentencing Trust in 2001

== Notable teachers ==
- Kirstin Daly-Taylor – Former Olympic athlete in basketball and Head Coach for the Hawke's Bay Hawks
- Joe Schmidt – Former coach of the Irish International Rugby Union Team

== Sources ==
- Gustafson, Barry (1986). The First 50 Years : A History of the New Zealand National Party. Auckland: Reed Methuen. ISBN 0-474-00177-6.
