= David Williams (New Zealand legal scholar) =

New Zealand legal scholar

David Williams FRSNZ
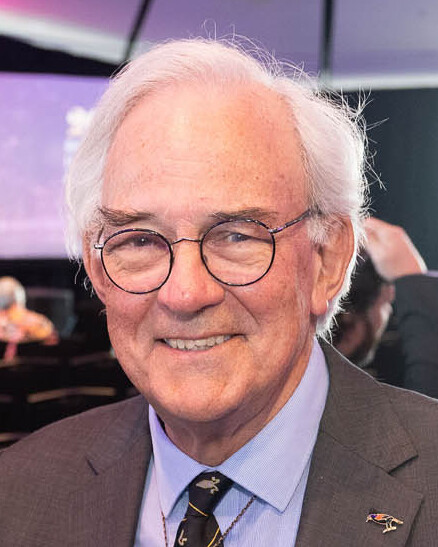
- Williams in 2024

Academic background
- Education: Victoria University of Wellington; Balliol College; University of Dar es Salaam; University of Oxford

Academic work
- Discipline: law
- Institutions: University of Auckland
- Main interests: Treaty of Waitangi

David Vernon Williams FRSNZ is a professor, and former deputy dean of the University of Auckland's Faculty of Law. He comes from the Hawke's Bay region of New Zealand, and was educated at Wanganui Collegiate School.

== Education and career ==
His formal tertiary education qualifications include undergraduate degrees in history and in law (BA/LLB) from Victoria University of Wellington, a graduate degree in law (BCL) from the University of Oxford, England, where he was a Rhodes Scholar at Balliol College, and a doctoral research qualification from the University of Dar es Salaam, Tanzania (PhD) that included an analysis of colonial legal history in New Zealand, and a Diploma in Theology from the University of Oxford (DipTheol).

He is a barrister and solicitor of the High Court of New Zealand and holds a practising certificate to act as a barrister. He was employed as a legal academic at universities in England, Tanzania, and New Zealand from 1971 to 1991, and during that time he wrote numerous published articles and book chapters on issues related to colonial law, indigenous law and the Treaty of Waitangi.

From 1992 to 2000, his primary occupation was as a consultant contracted to research on law in history and on Treaty of Waitangi-related legal issues. He has acted in a variety of capacities in contracts with the Crown Forestry Rental Trust, the Law Commission, and Te Puni Kōkiri. He was responsible for the Māori Land Legislation Manual (and Database) which was published in two volumes by the Crown Forestry Rental Trust in 1994 and 1995. He is the author of Te Kooti Tango Whenua': The Native Land Court, 1864–1909 published by Huia Publishers in 1999.

Williams made front-page-news in 1978 when he walked into an Auckland Police station and asked to be arrested for stealing a pen from his employer. This was a protest against police racism; police had two days earlier had arrested a Pacific Island migrant for stealing a comb from his employer.

He has acted as an arbitrator in respect of Māori-owned forestry land. He is the honorary legal adviser to Te Pīhopatanga o Aotearoa (Anglican Church) and a member of the Anglican Church's General Synod/Te Hinota Whanui. In 2001, he was appointed an associate professor in law at the University of Auckland, and in 2005 was promoted to full professor.

In 2018, Williams was elected a Fellow of the Royal Society of New Zealand.

== Works ==
- Crown policy affecting Māori knowledge systems and cultural practices. Wellington: Waitangi Tribunal, 2001.
- Mātauranga Māori and taonga: the nature and extent of Treaty rights held by iwi and hapū in indigenous flora and fauna, cultural heritage objects, valued traditional knowledge. Wellington: Waitangi Tribunal, 2001.
- The Taking into account of te ao Maori in relation to reform of the law of succession: a working paper (with Pat Hohepa). Wellington: Law Commission, 1996.
- Te Kooti tango whenua: The Native Land Court 1864–1909. Wellington: Huia Publishers, 1999.
- Waitangi revisited: perspectives on the Treaty of Waitangi, edited by Michael Belgrave, Merata Kawharu and David Williams. Oxford University Press, 2005.
