= Arthur Worthington (fraudster) =

American fraudster

Arthur Bentley Worthington
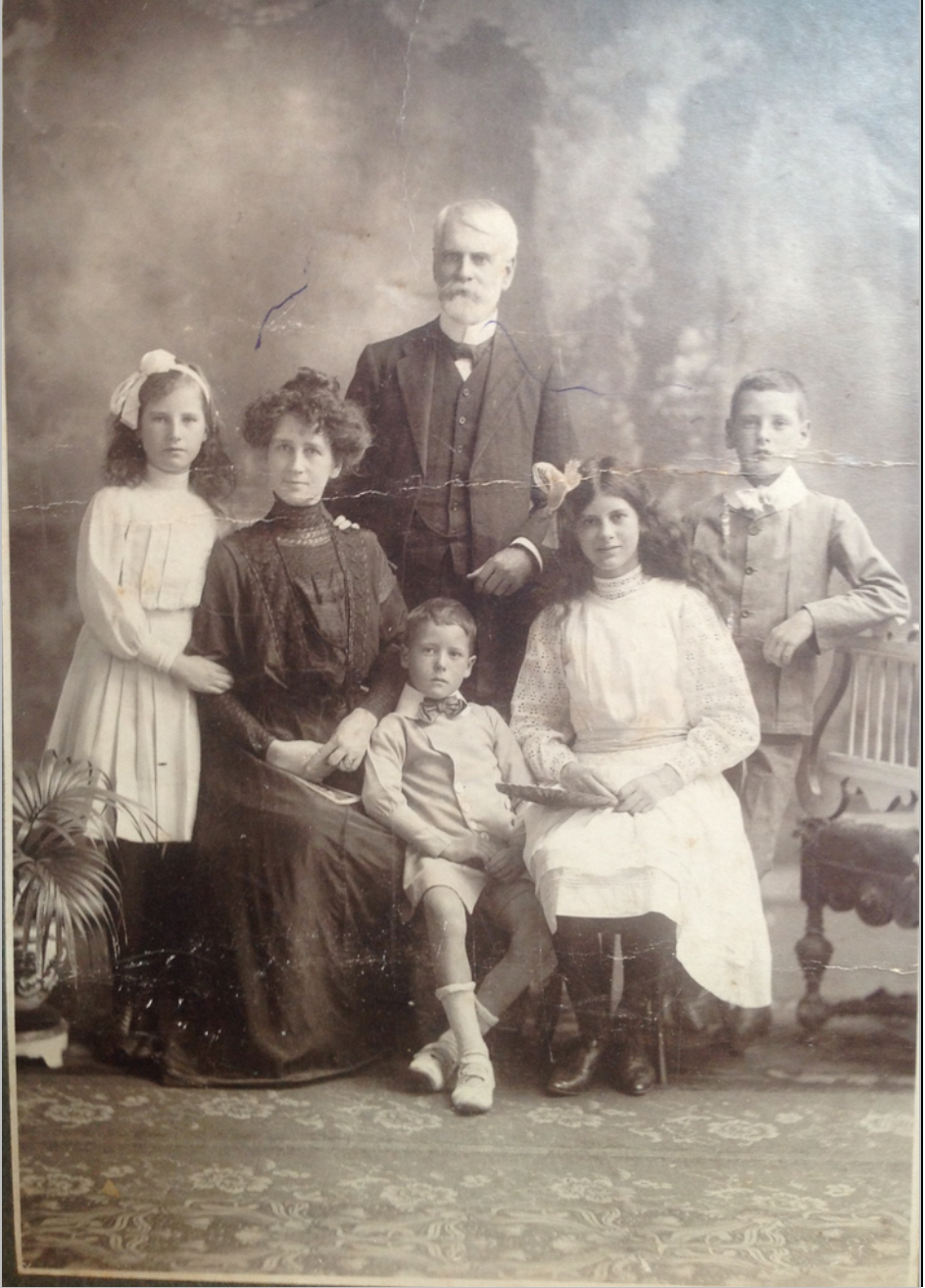
- A family photo of Worthington with one of his wives Evelyn Maud Jordan and their children, taken in 1910.
- Born: Samuel Oakley Crawford; 1 March 1847; Saugerties, New York
- Died: 13 December 1917 (aged 70); New York
- Other names: Eugene Samuel Bouvier Walton, Major Eugene Bouvier, Eugene Bonner, E. R. Bannerton, Mons. Bennateau, Major Horace Oakley Wood, Arthur Wood, W. D. Wood, Arlington Buckingham Wadsworth, Dr A. B. Worthington
- Occupation: Alternative religious leader
- Known for: Fraud

Arthur Bentley Worthington (born Samuel Oakley Crawford, 1 March 1847 – 13 December 1917) was an American fraudster, alternative religious leader and bigamist. Active in the United States, New Zealand and Australia just before the turn of the 20th century, he variously claimed to be a Methodist minister, a lawyer, a banker, a faith healer, a spiritualist, a real estate agent, a mining consultant, a temperance preacher, or a military veteran, and used at least eight known aliases. In 1890 he briefly founded a new religious movement in New Zealand.

== Early life ==
Samuel Oakley Crawford was born on 1 March 1847, in Saugerties, New York, the son of a storekeeper and Deputy Sheriff. He was the third child in a family of four. He enrolled as a private during the American Civil War in the 5th New York Heavy Artillery Regiment between 1864 and 1865 and was wounded in the left leg. He studied law at Columbia College and graduated with a Bachelor of Arts in 1867. In 1868 he married Josephine Erricson Moore and moved to Philadelphia. Their first child Susan was born in 1869. He soon left Josephine, and they never divorced, so all of his subsequent marriages were bigamous. It is said that he bankrupted his parents by not repaying loans.

== Career in America (1870–1889) ==
In 1870 he was convicted of swindling money from a Dutchman and spent three years in the Albany Penitentiary. After his release in 1873 he married Gabrielle "Gay" Finefield (1859-1946). In 1875 he married again in Ohio and swindled $3000 from his new father-in-law. In 1876 as Eugene Bouvier he married again, and practiced law in Kansas City until a sheriff's reward of $50 was posted for his arrest. He then returned to Peoria, Illinois in May 1876 as Eugene Samuel Bouvier Walton and posed as a temperance preacher. In 1877 he was in San Francisco as Major Eugene Bonner, and defrauded a Miss Langley of $2000 before fleeing to Salt Lake City, Utah where he posed as a Mormon preacher. After "borrowing" $2000 from a Mormon elder for a fictitious library he fled to Sherman, Texas, posing as a lawyer. In September 1878 as Eugene Benneteau he married Eliza Hunton. At the end of that year he left her to join the Helen Blythe Dramatic Company in Toronto, Canada, where he married an actress later known as Mrs Hudson.

He next settled as a lawyer in New Lisbon, Wisconsin from 1879 to 1882. He married again and had three children, only one of whom survived: Katherine Benneteau (1881-1977), later Mrs Patrick. He was in court in December 1881 for forging a note worth $400: his law partner H. E. Macomber and one James F. Ramsay posted bail of $500, but he fled in January 1882, leaving them to pay the bail.

During 1882–83 he posed as an English tourist, defrauding hoteliers and shopkeepers along the Northern Pacific Railway. He was in Boston 1883-5 as E. R. Bannerton, defrauding wealthy widows: one Mrs Sargent lost $3000. In 1885–86 he was in Charleston, West Virginia, where he defrauded a coal magnate J. E. Dana of $3000. In April 1886, posing as 'Major' Horace Oakley Wood, he married Lizzie Hill, daughter of a wealthy citizen, and converted her father's wedding present into cash to set up a bank: having raised $4600 in stock for the bank, he disappeared. In July 1887 he was in Spokane, Washington, as Arlington Buckingham Wadsworth, floating another bank scheme. On 18 October he contracted his seventh bigamous marriage to a Miss Cannon, then fled with her money to New York. In November 1887 he married a Miss Emma Terry, heiress to $150,000. In 1888 he was in Grand Forks, North Dakota, practicing law as 'General' Ward. Forced to flee, he went to Minneapolis, then to Montreal, Canada, where he was recognized by a private investigator, causing him to flee to Winnipeg, then Chicago.

In March 1889 he appeared in New York as Arthur Bently Worthington and posed as a Christian Science faith healer. Mrs Mary Plunkett, editor of the International Magazine of Christian Science, fell in love with Worthington and claimed to have converted him to "righteousness". Her husband, John T. Plunkett, a prominent Christian Scientist, agreed to an amicable separation, giving her custody of their two children. He then investigated Worthington's past career, and exposed him as a bigamist and fraudster. However, Mary remained devoted to Worthington, and they fled to London, England, before taking ship for New Zealand.

== Career in New Zealand (1890–1895) ==
Worthington moved to Christchurch, New Zealand in 1890 with Mary Plunkett as his wife, and her two children. Claiming the degrees of MA and LLD (though he had neither), Worthington first gave free lectures on science, metaphysics and religion, and held magical entertainments for children, before establishing a new church which combined elements of theosophy and Christian Science with faith healing. Worthington later claimed 400 adult followers and 300 Sunday School children.

His devoted converts to "The Truth" paid for the erection of an impressive "Temple of Truth" on the northern side of Latimer Square at the corner of Madras and Armagh Streets, along with a large house for his family. Music played an important part in the appeal of his services, which were accompanied by an orchestra and pipe organ. One observer, the lawyer and later judge Oscar Alpers, soon concluded that he was a fraud, but a very clever one. According to Alpers, Worthington exuded sincerity, and quoted from a wide range of authors, from Plato to Ralph Waldo Emerson. He had the gift of making the most banal and vague platitudes sound as if they were new and original insights.

While in Christchurch he published a volume of his sermons, The Worthington Lectures, a pamphlet on 'sexology', and a journal, The Comforter. Pastors of mainstream churches saw their pews empty as young couples flocked to the Worthingtons' marriage guidance sessions, which apparently advocated contraception and joyful sex.

In 1891 Worthington was condemned by the Canterbury Medical Society for advising the parents of a boy with diphtheria to pray rather than seek medical assistance. By the time a doctor was called it was too late and the boy died. The society declared Worthington's teachings "a direct menace to the Public Health". The boy's father, a house-painter named Duggan, had been persuaded by Worthington that in a previous life he had painted the doors of Noah's Ark. Despite this and other criticisms in the local papers, the Temple of Truth attracted a congregation of several hundred devoted followers.

In June 1893 Worthington's previous criminal career in the United States was revealed by a Methodist preacher, Dr John Hosking, and the Temple of Truth was subjected to 'rough music' by his parishioners, who rapped against the door with sticks and threw a stone onto the roof to disrupt Worthington's services. Mrs Plunkett now developed her own following, the Order of the Temple, and called herself 'Sister Magdala'. Tired of Worthington's numerous affairs with his female followers, she advocated celibacy within marriage. Worthington repudiated Mary, sending her to live with her children at Coker's Hotel in Christchurch. She signed the petition for women's suffrage in 1893 as Mrs Worthington.

In 1894 Mrs Elizabeth Mary Ingram, a widow and member of the Rational Dress Society, sued the trustees of the Temple for the interest owing on six debentures worth £400. This case revealed many details about the financing of the Temple. One of Worthington's most generous supporters had been Thomas J. Edmonds, manufacturer of Edmond's "Sure to Rise" baking powder. There were dozens of other debenture holders who were unable to recover the interest owing to them. The case dragged on through various appeals until January 1895, when the Temple of Truth was put up for auction and bought by a Mr Weber as agent for A. B. Worthington.

In August 1895 Worthington married a young woman named Evelyn Maud Jordan, who went on to bear him four children. This marriage divided what remained of Worthington's flock: one of his earliest converts, city councillor George Simpson, seceded, taking half the congregation with him. When John Marryat Hornsby published a detailed account of Worthington's previous career in his short-lived newspaper The Sun, Worthington sued him for libel, and won the case on a technicality, but was awarded only £10 damages. Hornsby was ill and bankrupt, and The Sun was wound up.

Worthington suddenly departed for Australia in December 1895, ostensibly to raise funds for his Temple of Truth, but when he returned in 1897 the trustees refused him entry to the building. He hired the Oddfellows' Lodge Hall and announced a series of Sunday lectures. On 26 September over a thousand people filled the hall, hissing and booing, and the police were called to keep order. Yet more people in the street blocked his departure, until Magistrate Beetham climbed onto a cab to read the Riot Act, its first and only reading in Christchurch.

== Career in Australia (1899–1904) ==
Worthington was now thoroughly discredited in New Zealand, and next to nothing is known of him during 1898. He reappears in Australia in 1899. In 1902 he was convicted in Melbourne of having defrauded a wealthy widow, Mrs Miranda May de la Juveney. He had convinced her that she was a reincarnation of the ancient Egyptian god Isis, and he, of course, was Osiris. The sentencing judge declared him "one of the most dangerous imposters ever to come to Australia".

== Later years, death and legacy ==
After spending seven years in prison, he collected his wife and children from New Zealand and took them back to New York. He was appointed a Presbyterian pastor in Poughkeepsie in 1910, but was later exposed and expelled. He was arrested for fraud in 1917 and died in prison at Newburgh, New York, on 13 December, allegedly after being confronted by his last victim.

Mary Plunkett had also moved to Australia but returned to Christchurch, New Zealand in 1899 to set up a School of Mental Science, and in March 1901 married John Staines Atkinson, the brother of a former New Zealand Premier. The marriage was not a success, and she committed suicide by drowning in June 1901.

Not recorded under Religious Denominations in the 1891 New Zealand Census, the 'Students of Truth' numbered 340 in the 1896 Census. However, by 1901 their numbers had shrunk to 33, and to 18 in 1906. In the 1911 Census there were just 6. There was no entry for 'Students of Truth' in the 1916 Census.

The Temple of Truth in Christchurch was sold to property developers and in 1898 it was renamed the Choral Hall, becoming a popular venue for concerts, traveling shows and political speeches. It later became known as the Latimer Dance Hall. The building was demolished in 1966 and the site has been a corner car park ever since.

Descendants of Worthington and Evelyn May Jordan are still to be found in New York State.

== Bibliography ==
- Dunmore, John: Wild Cards: Eccentric Characters from New Zealand's Past: Auckland: New Holland: 2006: ISBN 1-86966-132-X
- Hill, Richard S. "Arthur Bently Worthington". Dictionary of New Zealand Biography. Ministry for Culture and Heritage.
- Hosking, John: A Christchurch Quack Unmasked: Christchurch: H.F.Weeks: 1893.
- Criminal Details of Worthington: Christchurch: Weeks: 1891.
- Rice, Geoffrey W. (2013). Christchurch Crimes and Scandals. Canterbury University Press. pp. 170–192. ISBN 9781927145517.
