= Arthur George Harvey =

New Zealand doctor

- Born: 28 December 1866; Steyning, Sussex, England
- Died: 24 July 1927 (aged 60); New Zealand
- Occupation: Doctor

Arthur George Harvey (28 December 1866 – 24 July 1927) was a New Zealand medical doctor.

== Life ==
Harvey was born in Steyning, Sussex, England, on 28 December 1866. When he was a small child his family emigrated to New Zealand where his father, Anglican minister Bache Wright Harvey, took up positions as vicar in Westport, at St Paul's Cathedral in Wellington, in Whanganui and as headmaster of Whanganui Collegiate School.

Harvey attended school in Wellington and at Whanganui Collegiate before leaving New Zealand to study at St John's College, Cambridge. He graduated with a BA followed by his MB BChir in 1893. Although his family had returned to England after his father's death he chose to return to New Zealand settling in the Pātea-Waverley area. He was a general practitioner based in Pātea, public vaccinator and medical superintendent of Patea Hospital from 1897 to 1901. During World War I Harvey served in Egypt and France in the New Zealand Medical Corps.

Harvey was well known for his inventiveness and ingenuity as his practice serving very remote communities presented particular challenges. He supplied remote patients with homing pigeons for communication and engineered solutions to various problems such as stretchers suitable for rough terrain and incubators. His work was so appreciated by the community that they bought him a new car. He practiced 'twilight sleep' to relieve the pain of childbirth.

Harvey died at Patea Hospital of pneumonia on 24 July 1927.

== Personal life ==
Harvey's younger brother Alfred, who was also a doctor, was killed during World War I. Harvey married Matilda (Tilly) Adelaide Bremer in 1896 and they had three daughters and one son.

Harvey's daughter Dorothea Joblin wrote her father's biography Harvey Come Quick: The Story of the Little Doctor of Waverley.
