= Ken Deas =

New Zealand cricketer

- Deas in 1967

Personal information
- Full name: Kenneth Robin Deas
- Born: 10 July 1927; Papatoetoe, Auckland, New Zealand
- Died: 20 October 2000 (aged 73); Middlemore, Auckland, New Zealand
- Batting: Right-handed
- Bowling: Slow left-arm orthodox

Domestic team information
- Years: Team
- 1947/48–1960/61: Auckland

Career statistics
Competition	First-class
Matches	18
Runs scored	522
Batting average	17.40
100s/50s	0/1
Top score	73
Balls bowled	618
Wickets	9
Bowling average	34.77
5 wickets in innings	0
10 wickets in match	0
Best bowling	4/81
Catches/stumpings	13/–
- Source: ESPNcricinfo, 19 May 2022

Kenneth Robin Deas (10 July 1927 – 20 October 2000) was a New Zealand cricketer and administrator.

A right-handed batsman and slow left-arm orthodox spin bowler, Deas played 16 first-class matches for Auckland between 1947 and 1961. He also played two first-class matches for Scotland in 1955 and 1956. His highest score was 73, when Auckland defeated Canterbury by one wicket in the Plunket Shield in January 1951.

Deas was first appointed a selector for Auckland in September 1965, when he also convened the three-man selection panel. Two months later he was appointed as one of the four national selectors, and he became convener of the national selection panel in November 1970. He remained as a national selector until 1975. He also managed New Zealand touring teams and served as president of New Zealand Cricket.

Deas worked as a pharmacist. While working in Scotland he played for the national team. He and his wife Marie had a son and three daughters. He died in the Auckland suburb of Middlemore in October 2000.
