= Peter Hall (cricketer) =

New Zealand cricketer

Personal information
- Full name: Peter James Hall
- Born: 4 December 1927; The Peak, Hong Kong
- Died: 30 May 2014 (aged 86); Wellington, New Zealand
- Batting: Right-handed
- Bowling: Right-arm medium

Domestic team information
- Years: Team
- 1948–1949: Cambridge University
- 1955/56: Otago
- Source: ESPNcricinfo, 13 May 2016

Peter Hall (4 December 1927 – 30 May 2014) was a Hong Kong born cricketer. He played first-class cricket for Cambridge University between 1948 and 1949 and for Otago during the 1955–56 season.

Hall was born at The Peak in Hong Kong in 1927 and educated at Geelong Grammar School in Australia from 1942 to 1946. He went up to Cambridge and played cricket for a variety of university-based sides during 1948. Described as "a tall fast-medium bowler", he made his first-class debut during the season, appearing for the side against Northants at Fenner's in mid-May. After playing in the next match against Middlesex he dropped out of the side until the following season.

During 1949 Hall played in nine matches for Cambridge. He won his Blue in the 1949 University Match, taking two wickets and scoring 12 runs in a Cambridge victory. In total Hall played 11 first-class matches for the university, taking 27 wickets and scoring 172 runs. His only five-wicket haul in top-level matches came against Somerset.

Between the 1955–56 and 1956–57 seasons, Hall played cricket for Otago. He scored 69 runs against Hutt Valley in January 1956, an innings which won the match for Otago, The Press reporting that he "timed his drives beautifully" during the innings. Later in the month he played in his only Plunket Shield match for the side, a fixture against Wellington at the Basin Reserve. He scored 33 runs, again batting well, "with fluent drives and shots through the covers" in what The Press called a "stylish effort" in the first innings and was the only Otago player who "looked a real batsman" in the second as Otago collapsed for a score of only 102.

This was Hall's only first-class match in New Zealand, although he played in the annual match against Southland in both seasons he played for Otago sides as well as in other matches, including for the Second XI. In March 1966 he played in for Hong Kong against the England side returning from its tour of Australia and New Zealand, taking the wickets of Geoff Boycott and Barry Knight, England's established Test match batsmen.

Hall died in 2014 at Wellington. He was aged 86.
