= Alice Elsie Reeve =

New Zealand jeweler (1885–1927)

- Born: 23 March 1885; Melbourne, Victoria, Australia
- Died: 6 April 1927 (aged 42)
- Occupation: Jeweller

Alice Elsie Reeve (23 March 1885 – 6 April 1927) was a New Zealand jeweller. She was born in Melbourne, Victoria, Australia in 1885.
