= Pat Hond =

- Born: Patricia Laura Te Waikapoata Mathieson; 31 March 1927; New Plymouth, New Zealand
- Died: 18 November 1989 (aged 62); New Plymouth, New Zealand
- Occupation(s): Tribal leader, teacher, soldier, policewoman, community worker
- Years active: 1948–53, 1976–84 (teacher); 1953–55 (soldier); 1955–58 (policewoman); 1984–89 (community worker)
- Spouse: Jeffrey Hond (m. 1958)

Patricia Laura Te Waikapoata Hond (née Mathieson; 31 March 1927 – 18 November 1989) was a New Zealand tribal leader, teacher, soldier, policewoman and community worker. Of Māori descent, she identified with the Taranaki iwi.

== Early life ==
Patricia Laura Te Waikapoata Mathieson was born on 31 March 1927 in New Plymouth, Taranaki, New Zealand, the daughter of Thomas Berge Tupeka "Bert" Mathieson, a motor mechanic, and Norah Laura Te Aroaro o Paritutu Ruakere. She was raised as a Roman Catholic, attending St Joseph's Roman Catholic School in Moturoa and Sacred Heart Convent High School in Fitzroy in her youth. She is one of seven children, having four brothers and two sisters.

== Career ==
=== 1948–1953: Teaching ===
Training as a teacher in Auckland, Mathieson began teaching in a number of schools; in Ōhura, in Tokomaru Bay, and St Joseph's Māori Girls' College in Taradale, Napier.

=== 1953–1955: New Zealand Women's Royal Army ===
In 1953, Mathieson quit teaching to join the New Zealand Women's Royal Army as a corporal, being sent to Waiouru as an education assistant. She spent two years in the army, spending much of her time representing the army in various sports such as netball, basketball and athletics, setting records in five track and field events, for which she earned her colours. In 1955, she was promoted to sergeant and sent to Fort Dorset in Wellington.

=== 1955–1958: New Zealand Police ===
In 1955, Mathieson left the army and joined the New Zealand Police, notably being the first female Māori to do so. Out-performing all of the other cadets during her training, she was promoted from a beat constable to a detective in 1958. Shortly following her marriage on 24 May, Mathieson, now Hond, retired from the police force in order to start a family.

=== 1976–1984: Tertiary and secondary teaching ===
Hond worked as a teacher at the Hamilton Teachers' College beginning in 1976, focusing on early childhood education. She soon went to work at Hillcrest High School in Hamilton in 1978, before shortly being appointed deputy principal of the school connected to the Department of Social Welfare Girls' Home, both teaching and counselling.

=== 1984–1989: Community worker ===
Moving to New Plymouth in 1984, Hond joined a prison reform committee and worked as a community officer for the Department of Māori Affairs. In 1987, she founded the Taranaki Activity Centre, an alternative education system for otherwise wayward youth.

== Death ==
Due to heart problems, possibly contributed to by 40 years of smoking cigarettes, Hond died on 18 November 1989 in New Plymouth, being survived by her husband and remaining five children. She was buried in the Ruakere family cemetery in Puniho.

== Personal life ==
On 24 May 1958, Mathieson married Jeffrey "Jeff" Hond, a Royal New Zealand Air Force warrant officer in Wellington. They went on to have six children: three sons and three daughters. One son died in childhood.

Hond studied at the University of Waikato in 1975.

Hond formed Te Reo o Taranaki, an organisation dedicated to promoting Māori culture. Under this aegis of this organisation, Hond successfully campaigned for a Māori studies department at the Western Institute of Technology at Taranaki. Aware of the effect alcohol had on her Māori culture, Hond was a non-drinker.
