= Thomas Wells (cricketer) =

New Zealand cricketer (1927–2001)

Personal information
- Full name: Thomas Umfrey Wells
- Born: 6 February 1927; Panmure, Auckland, New Zealand
- Died: 30 July 2001 (aged 74); New Zealand
- Batting: Left-handed
- Bowling: Right arm, style unknown

Domestic team information
- Years: Team
- 1950–52: Cambridge University
- 1950: Worcestershire

Career statistics
Competition	FC
Matches	21
Runs scored	446
Batting average	16.51
100s/50s	0/2
Top score	77*
Balls bowled	228
Wickets	5
Bowling average	23.80
5 wickets in innings	0
10 wickets in match	0
Best bowling	2-24
Catches/stumpings	8/0
- Source: CricketArchive, 12 October 2008

Thomas Umfrey Wells (6 February 1927 – 30 July 2001) was a New Zealand-born first-class cricketer and educator who played first-class cricket in England in the early 1950s. All but one of his appearances were for Cambridge University, but he also played one match for Worcestershire in 1950.

== Life and career ==
Wells was educated at King's College, Auckland, and the University of Auckland where he was awarded blues for cricket in 1948 and 1949 and was captain in 1949. He then won an Orford Studentship for King's College, Cambridge.

He made his first-class debut for Cambridge against the touring West Indians at Fenner's in May 1950, though his part in the match was small, not batting, holding a single catch and bowling three wicketless overs for 28. The game itself was a very high scoring draw: John Dewes (183) and David Sheppard (227) put on 343 for Cambridge's first wicket, and the university declared at 594/4. In reply the tourists piled up 703/3, including a career-best 304 not out by Everton Weekes.

Wells made more of an impact in his second game, against Leicestershire, where his unbeaten 77 was the highest score of his first-class career. He also picked up the first of his handful of wickets when he bowled Leicestershire's Australian batsman Vic Jackson. His only other half-century came just a week later when he notched 53 against the Free Foresters.

Wells' single appearance for Worcestershire was in August 1950, when the county played Somerset at New Road. He had a poor match, scoring 0 and 9, and though he did take two catches they were both to dismiss tail-enders. Worcestershire collapsed in their first innings against the leg-spin of Johnny Lawrence, who took career-best figures of 8-41, and Somerset won the match by four wickets.

Wells played on for Cambridge in 1951, without conspicuous success, and made a final first-class appearance for the university against Surrey at The Oval in June 1952. Opening the batting in both innings, he scored 26 and 13 as Cambridge went down to an innings defeat. He did play occasional minor games thereafter, for example appearing for the London New Zealand Club when the New Zealanders toured England in 1958.

Wells taught at Clifton College from 1952 to 1960, then returned to the country of his birth where he was appointed headmaster of Collegiate School at Whanganui, a position he held from 1960 to 1980. He played cricket for Wanganui against Nelson in the 1964-65 Hawke Cup.
