= Whanganui Collegiate School =

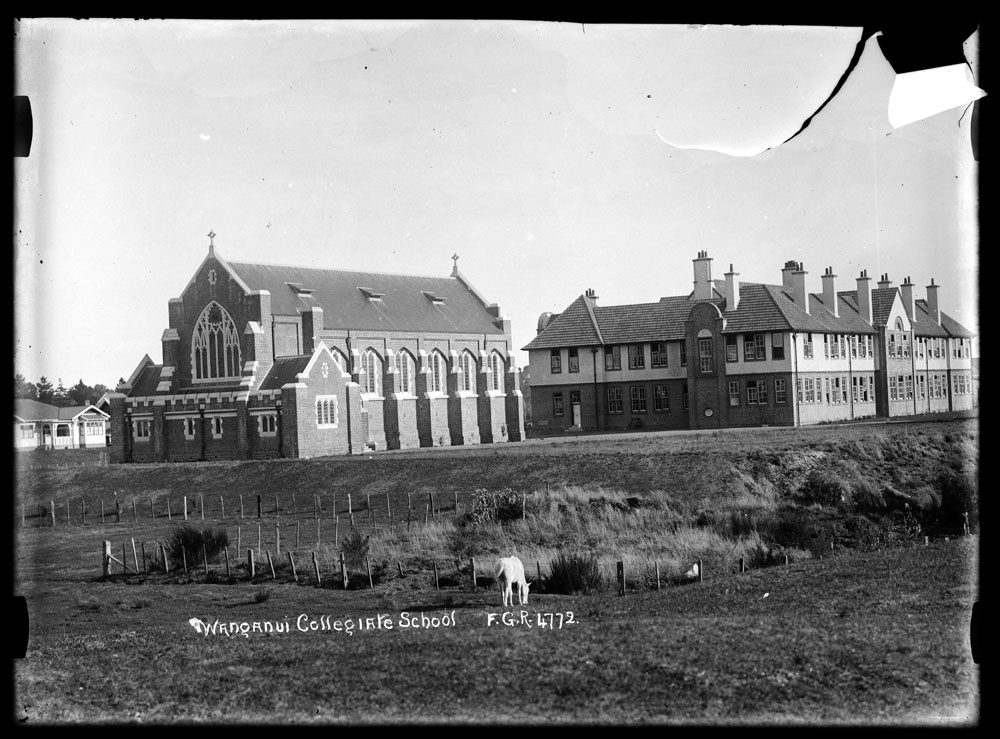
- The school and chapel in 1912

Location
- Liverpool Street, Whanganui, New Zealand; 39°55′44.51″S 175°2′15.48″E

Information
- Type: State integrated Day & Boarding
- Motto: Vestigia Nulla Retrorsum (Never A Footstep Back)
- Denomination: Anglican
- Established: 1854; 172 years ago
- Ministry of Education Institution no.: 192
- Headmaster: Ainsley Robson
- Years: 9–13
- Gender: Coeducational
- Enrolment: 357 (July 2026)
- Socio-economic decile: 9Q
- Website: www.collegiate.school.nz

Whanganui Collegiate School is a state-integrated, coeducational, day and boarding secondary school located in Whanganui, in the Manawatū-Whanganui region of New Zealand. Affiliated with the Anglican Church, it is the third oldest school in New Zealand. The school’s campus is officially registered as a category 1 historic place with Heritage New Zealand.

== History ==
Whanganui Collegiate School was established in 1854 as the Native Industrial School by the Anglican Church, following a land endowment from Sir George Grey. The school initially struggled with low enrolments, having only 30 students in the early 1870s. In 1878, the school became a boys' school, discontinuing female enrolments. In the 1880s, Reverend Bache Wright Harvey from Cambridge was appointed headmaster. Under Harvey's leadership, the school adopted the English public school model. Although the school was originally founded to educate children of all races and socio-economic backgrounds, the shift to a boys' school was widely supported, including by Sir George Grey. In 1882, the school was renamed Wanganui Collegiate College under Harvey's leadership. (Note: Whanganui was spelt as Wanganui throughout most of the 19th and 20th centuries)

Until 1901, the school was the only secondary education option for boys in Whanganui. Wanganui Collegiate was exempt from the 1903 Secondary Schools Act due to its Anglican affiliation, and it became a private school funded by endowment. During this period, the school attracted boarders from outside the region. In 1906, the Education Trust Commission investigated whether the school adhered to the terms of its land grant. This led to plans for the school's relocation from its original site on Victoria Avenue to a more remote location on Liverpool Street. In 1908, the firm Atkins and Bacon was contracted to design a new campus at the Liverpool Street site, and the Supreme Court approved a loan of up to £50,000 for the project. Construction began in 1908, with the foundation stone laid by Governor Lord Plunket in 1909. The campus was officially opened in Easter 1911 by Governor Lord Islington, although some buildings were still under construction, and some structures from the old campus were relocated to the new site.

The chapel at the new campus was not included in the loan agreement, so it was funded by headmaster Walter Empson and contributions from old boys. Empson's responsibility for the chapel project led to the hiring of architect William Gray Young for its design. The chapel was dedicated in Easter 1912, and it was later extended due to increasing enrolment, with a re-dedication ceremony in September 1986.

In the 1960s, the school reached a new peak enrolment of 342 students. To accommodate the growth, additional facilities were built, allowing the school to house 545 students by 1976. However, during the late 1980s, the number of boarders declined, following global trends and the 1987 stock market crash. In 1989, the school began enrolling senior girls in an effort to boost enrolment and finances. Despite this, the school's financial situation remained challenging, and in 1999, Marris and Porritt Houses were repurposed as technology blocks.

In 2009, the school board applied to the Ministry of Education for integration within the state system, a process that was completed by November 2012.

In 1984, the school opened a new auditorium, named after Prince Edward, who had served as a tutor at the school for two years. The auditorium also hosts private functions and events for the New Zealand Opera School. In 1994, the Izard Sports Centre was opened, funded by Richard Izard, an old boy who made a significant contribution to its construction.

Since 2019, Whanganui Collegiate has been one of three Round Square schools in New Zealand, alongside King's College and Christ's College.

In January 2019, the Whanganui Collegiate School Board of Trustees and Whanganui College Board of Trustees unanimously voted to add an "h" to the spelling of "Wanganui," following the renaming of the Whanganui District in November 2015.

In 2019, Whanganui Collegiate School opened the McKinnon Administration Building and the H.G. Carver Memorial Library. These new facilities were added to support the school's administrative functions and provide students with a modern space for study and research.

In mid-2023, Whanganui Collegiate School announced that it would replace NCEA Level 1 with Cambridge IGCSE starting in 2024.

== Houses ==
Following the establishment of the new campus a house system was established, the houses were: Grey, Selwyn, and Hadfield. Each house had its own building, courtyard, and ablution block. A fourth house, dedicated to the Headmaster Reverend Harvey was planned but was not completed until 1920 due to the costs, the same architectural firm and contractor were responsible for the building alongside a day facility, residence for the chaplain and steward, and a music room. Harvey's was constantly closed and reopened due to fluctuating enrolment numbers. In the 1960s Empson House was opened for junior boarders. A house for day students were later added as day student numbers grew and started to rival boarding students (in 1925 there were 222 boards versus 31 day students). In 1971, Governor-General Arthur Porritt opened Porritt House for day students. Godwin House was constructed in 1990 to accommodate newly accepted female students.

== Sport ==
The school grounds also host numerous sporting facilities, including the Izard Gymnasium, High Performance Cricket Centre, a water surface hockey turf, a full-sized Cross Country Course and many team sports fields. The nearby Whanganui River is used by students for rowing training and competitions; rowing being one of the sports in which Collegiate has traditionally excelled, having won the Maadi Cup 17 times, a national record. The Collegiate women's squad had a particularly strong year in 2006 when it won the most prestigious women's race in the lower north Island, the Levin Jubilee Trophy, for the first time. Unfortunately, such success could not be replicated on the national stage, with the u18 girls eight only managing bronze in the penultimate race of the 2007 Maadi Cup. The school also hosts the nationally popular Whanganui Cricket Festival each year which sees over 1000 cricketers display their skills throughout the month of January.

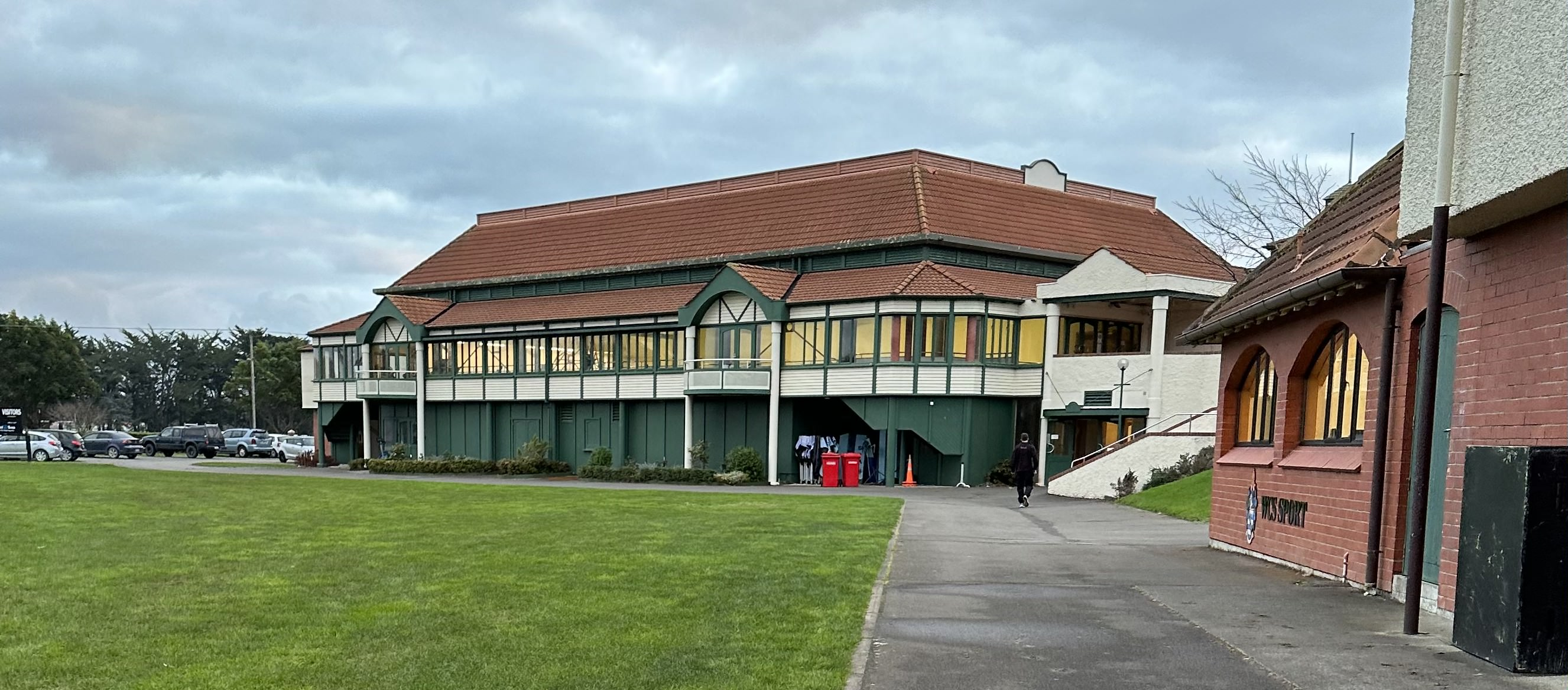
Izard Gymnasium

Since 1925, the school's 'First XV' rugby team has played Christ's College, Wellington College and Nelson College in an annual quadrangular rugby tournament, this Tournament is played at a different school every year playing at Collegiate once every four years. In recent times, this tournament has been dominated by Wellington College. Whanganui Collegiate last won in 1991.

The 100th Quadrangular Rugby Tournament was held from 18 to 20 June 2026 at Whanganui Collegiate School in Whanganui, New Zealand. The tournament featured four schools: Whanganui Collegiate School, Wellington College, Nelson College and Christ's College. The 2026 tournament marked the 100th playing of the Quadrangular, which began in 1925 and is one of New Zealand's oldest school rugby tournaments. Whanganui Collegiate hosted the centenary tournament, with matches played throughout the three-day event.

== Culture ==
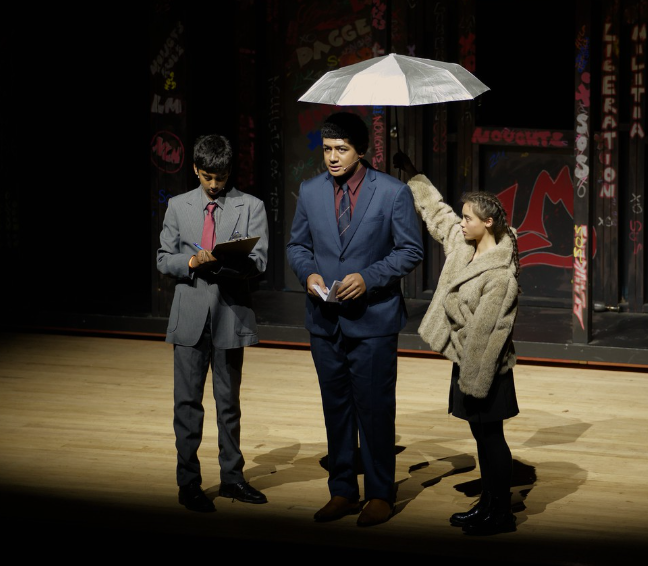
"Noughts and Crosses" (2024)

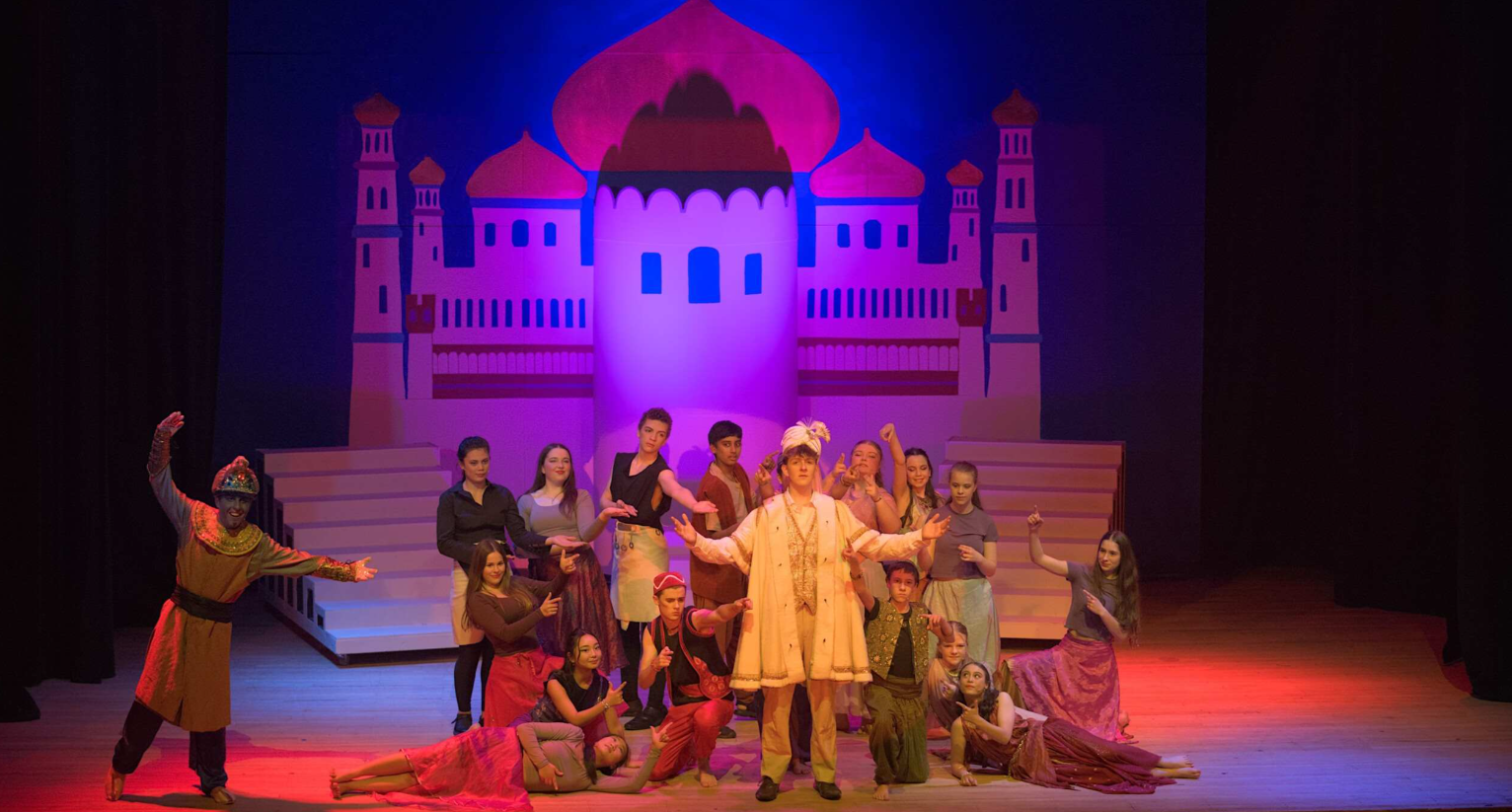
"Disney's Aladdin Jr" (2025)

Whanganui Collegiate School offers a range of music, drama and debating opportunities. Its music programme includes junior and senior rock bands, a weekly jazz band, individual music lessons, choir and vocal groups, chamber music, and the annual C.N. Maclean Music Contest. Students can perform at school and external events, enter competitions such as Smokefree Rockquest and The Big Sing, and participate in the New Zealand Schools Chamber Music Contest.

Drama is offered from Year 9 through IGCSE and NCEA Levels 2 and 3, covering acting, theatre design and directing. Musicals are held every two years, with students able to participate as cast, musicians or crew. In the off- years, a play is performed.

Debating is also an established activity at the school, developing analytical thinking, argument, public speaking and listening skills. Students can take part in Inter-House competitions and regional debating events at junior, intermediate and senior levels.

Productions:

- 2015: Jesus Christ Superstar
- 2016: Oliver!
- 2017: Grease
- 2018: Noises Off
- 2019: Bugsy Malone
- 2020: -House Drama-
- 2021: Cabaret
- 2022: Lord of The Flies
- 2023: Footloose
- 2024: Noughts and Crosses
- 2025: Disney's Aladdin Jr
- 2026: The Lion, The Witch, and The Wardrobe
- 2027: TBC

Since 1994, The New Zealand Opera School has been hosted at Collegiate by Donald Trott.

== Notable alumni ==
- Brigadier Leslie Andrew, WW1 Victoria Cross & DSO recipient
- Chris Amon, Formula One racing driver, 1966 24 Hours of Le Mans champion
- Harriet Austin, rower
- Earl Bamber, professional racing driver, 2015 24 Hours of Le Mans and 2017 24 Hours of Le Mans champion
- Andrew Bayly, National Party MP
- Geordie Beamish, 2025 World Champion 3000m steeplechase
- Cameron Brewer, Auckland Councillor and National Party MP
- Tom Bruce, New Zealand international cricketer
- Robin Cooke, Baron Cooke of Thorndon, Law Lord
- Mark Cooper, President of New Zealand Court of Appeal
- Professor Michael Corballis, professor of psychology
- Wyatt Creech, Deputy Prime Minister
- Simon Dickie, Olympic gold medalist in rowing
- Sir Harold Gillies, father of plastic surgery
- Leon Götz, National Party MP
- Sir Richard Harrison, National Party MP and Speaker of the House
- Volker Heine, physicist
- Joline Henry, Silver Fern netballer
- Nichkhun Horvejkul, Thai-American singer and actor based in South Korea, member of South Korean boy band 2PM
- Jimmy Hunter, member of The Original All Blacks
- Sir Roy Jack, National Party MP, Speaker of the House and Cabinet Minister
- Shehan Karunatilaka, Booker Prize winner
- David Kirk, All Black World Cup winning captain and former Chief Executive of Fairfax Media
- Patrick Marshall, geologist
- Hamish McDouall, Mayor of Whanganui
- Sir John McGrath, Solicitor-General and Supreme Court Justice
- Ian McKelvie, National Party MP
- Air Vice Marshal Cuthbert MacLean, RAF Officer
- Lloyd Morrison, businessman
- John Pattison (RNZAF officer), a Battle of Britain fighter pilot
- Arthur Porritt, Baron Porritt, former Governor-General of New Zealand, Olympic medallist
- Sir Hugh Rennie KC, lawyer and businessman
- Earle Riddiford, lawyer and mountaineer
- John Scott, former Director-General of the Fiji Red Cross
- Rebecca Scown, Olympic medalist in rowing
- Ratu Sir Lala Sukuna, Fijian statesman
- Sir Brian Talboys, Deputy Prime Minister 1975–1981
- Sir Ron Trotter, businessman
- Jeremy Wells, television and radio personality
- Professor David Williams, Treaty of Waitangi and legal scholar

== Headmasters ==
- Charles Henry Sinderby Nicholls (1854–1865)
- Henry H Godwin (1865–1877)
- George Richard Saunders (1878–1882)
- Bache Wright Harvey (1882–1887)
- Walter Empson (1888–1909)
- Julian Llewellyn Dove (1909–1914)
- Hugh Latter (1914–1916)
- Patrick Marshall (1917–1922)
- Robert Guy Wilson (1922)
- Charles Frederick Pierce (1922–1931)
- John Allen (1932–1935)
- Frank Gilligan (1936–1954)
- Rab Bruce Lockhart (1954–1960)
- Thomas Wells (1960–1980)
- Ian McKinnon (1980–1988)
- Trevor Stanton McKinlay (1988–1995)
- Johnathan Rae Hensman (1995–2003)
- Craig Considine (2003–2008)
- Tim Wilbur (2008–2013)
- Chris Moller (2013–2017)
- Ross Brown (2017–2017) (acting)
- Wayne Brown (2018–2025)
- Tash Bullock (2026-2026) (acting)
- Ainsley Robson (2026-current)
