= Charles Gordon Smyth =

New Zealand policeman, trade unionist and baker (1883–1927)

- Born: 17 April 1883; Oamaru, New Zealand
- Died: 17 November 1927 (aged 44)
- Occupations: Policeman; trade unionist; baker

Charles Gordon Smyth (17 April 1883 – 17 November 1927) was a notable New Zealand policeman, trade unionist and baker. He was born in Oamaru, New Zealand, in 1883.
