= Pat Sheahan (publican) =

Patrick James Sheahan (23 December 1927 – 7 August 2013) was a New Zealand rugby union player, publican and publisher.

== Early life ==
Sheahan was born in Auckland. He received his secondary education at St Peter's College, Auckland being a first day pupil of the school in 1939. He grew up in the Catholic parish of St. Michael's, Remuera where he served as an altar boy. His parents' home adjoined the Auckland Domain.

== Rugby ==
Sheahan played rugby union for Auckland Marist and, in 1948, for the New Zealand Barbarians. He was also briefly captain of the Auckland team before getting injured. He was later president of Auckland Marist.

== Rowing ==
'Away from rugby, he was an outstanding rower, being part of an Auckland Rowing Club eight that won a national title in 1946.' [Barbarian Rugby Club Past Members]

'A 1946 rowing race on the Whanganui River ends in a narrow victory for the Auckland team.' https://teara.govt.nz/en/video/18961/rowing-race

== Publisher ==
Sheahan's family was in the publishing business. His father was a publisher of the Zealandia and his aunts owned a business called the Catholic Depot. He worked in this business specialising in books. In time this led to his becoming New Zealand representative for Macmillan Publishers. In the 1960s he was president of the Commercial travellers' Club and was made a life member.

== Publican ==
In 1971, Sheahan became the managing partner of the Globe Hotel in Wakefield St, Central Auckland where he also lived with his wife, Desiree (they were married in 1951), seven children plus two more family friends, and a boarder. He remained with the hotel as publican until it was sold and demolished in 1998. "The Globe spun dizzily at times for students (it was one of the main drinking establishments for Auckland University), poets, expectant fathers, construction workers, softball players (Blandford Park was nearby), commercial travellers and even musicians from the touring national orchestra who stayed there."

== Death ==
Sheahan died on 7 August 2013.
