= Percy Gates Morgan =

New Zealand geologist, science administrator and botanical collector (1867–1927)

Percy Gates Morgan (2 September 1867 – 26 November 1927) was a notable New Zealand geologist and science administrator. He was born in Richmond, Tasmania, Australia, on 2 September 1867.
