= T. T. Rawhiti =

T. T. Rawhiti (c. 1851 – April 1927) was a New Zealand King movement secretary and administrator. Of Māori descent, he identified with the Ngāti Hauā and Waikato iwi. He was active from about 1887 to about 1922.

Rawhiti died at Tauwhare in April 1927, and his tangihanga took place at Kiwitahi Pā near Morrinsville.
