= Joan Talbot =

New Zealand fashion designer

- Born: 15 April 1927; Sydney, New South Wales, Australia
- Died: 25 July 2003 (aged 76); Auckland, New Zealand
- Awards: 1964 Golden Shears Awards

Joan Allison Talbot (15 April 1927 – 25 July 2003) was a New Zealand fashion designer and retailer. Her work is held in the permanent collection of the Museum of New Zealand Te Papa Tongarewa.

== Biography ==
Talbot was born in Sydney, Australia, on 15 April 1927, and later moved to New Zealand.

Before becoming a fashion designer, Talbot was a model with clothing manufacturer, Classic. In 1960 she purchased the fashion retailer Tarantella on Vulcan Lane in Auckland, and owned it for 14 years before it closed in 1970. In 1962, Tarantella won a Silver Shears award for leisurewear at the Golden Shears Awards (organised by the Auckland Professional Mannequins Association).

In 1964, Talbot created a wool evening gown and cape with plissé pleats that won the Golden Shears. This gown was later worn by Jan Furness (née Barkley) in the Miss New Zealand contest. It is now held at the Museum of New Zealand Te Papa Tongarewa.

Talbot was the president of the Vulcan Lane Association, which helped pedestrianise Vulcan Lane in 1968. She died on 25 July 2003, aged 76.
