= Robert Couper =

New Zealand cricketer

Personal information
- Full name: Robert Neil Couper
- Born: 19 December 1927; Palmerston North, Manawatū, New Zealand
- Died: 24 March 1997 (aged 69); Taihape, Rangitikei, New Zealand
- Batting: Right-handed
- Bowling: Slow left-arm orthodox

Domestic team information
- Years: Team
- 1951/52: Otago
- 1957/58–1963/64: Rangitikei
- Source: ESPNcricinfo, 7 May 2016

Robert Neil Couper (19 December 1927 – 24 March 1997) was a New Zealand cricketer. He played three first-class matches for Otago during the 1951–52 season.

Couper was born at Palmerston North in 1927 and educated at Christ's College, Christchurch before moving to Dunedin to study. He played club cricket for the Otago Boys' High School Old Boys team and was described as "one of the most probing all-rounders in the province" by the Otago Daily Times in January 1950. The paper went on to describe him as a "forceful and attractive batsman, a left-hand bowler of ability and one of the best fieldsmen in Otago" and considered his omission from the Otago representative team in December 1950 as a "big surprise". He had played in Otago's annual match against Southland earlier in the season, but did not make his first-class debut for Otago until a January 1952 match against Wellington at Basin Reserve, making scores of 25 and 36 runs and taking one wicket–dismissing Bob Vance hit wicket in Wellington's second innings.

He retained his place in the team for Otago's final Plunket Shield match of the season, taking three wickets in the first innings against Central Districts, before playing against the touring West Indians the following month. Couper later played for Rangitikei, making five Hawke Cup appearances for the team, and for the New Zealand Nomads in various other matches until the end of the 1967–68 season.

Living in Rangitikei, Couper ran a farm. He died at Taihape in 1997 aged 69. An obituary was published in the New Zealand Cricket Almanack in 2003.
