= Dorothy Fletcher =

New Zealand historian

Dorothy Woodham Fletcher (formerly King, née Graham; 25 July 1927 – 10 August 2017) was a New Zealand historian.

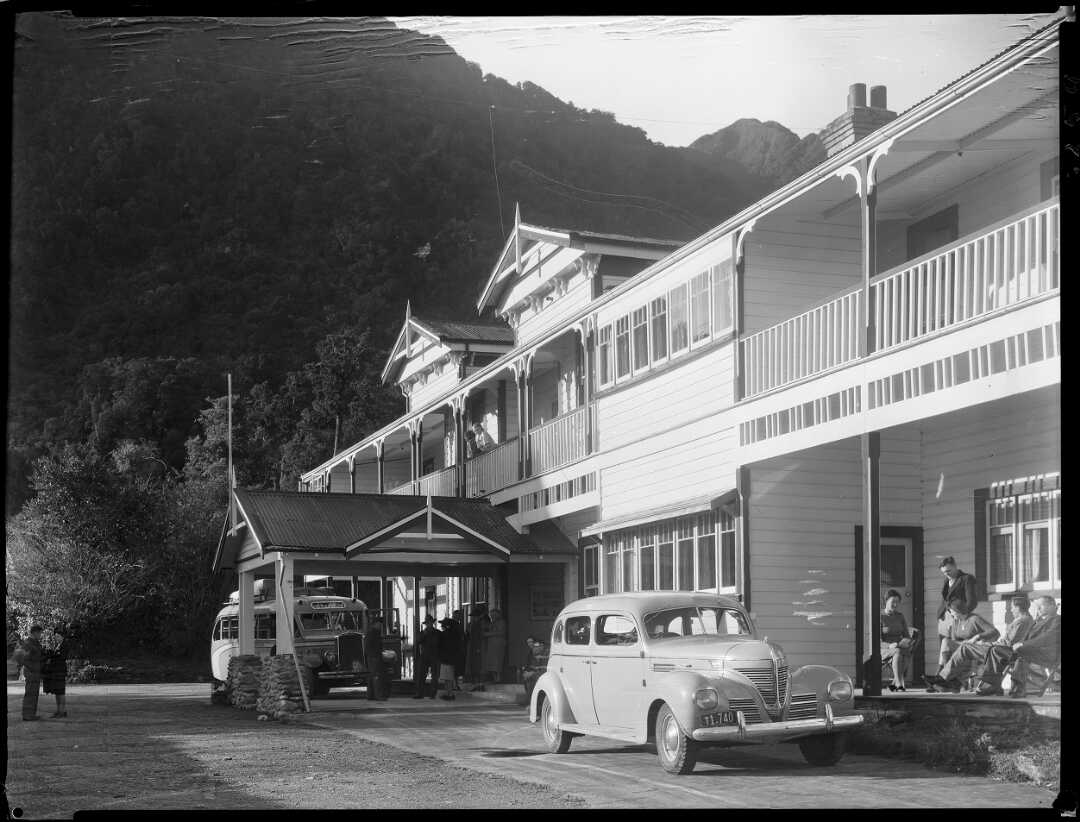
The Graham family's Franz Josef Glacier Hotel

== Biography ==
Fletcher was born in 1927 to Alec and Louisa Lydia Graham, part-owners of Franz Josef Glacier Hotel at Franz Josef. Her parents had met in England during World War I; her mother was English and her father from South Westland. Fletcher grew up in Franz Josef, and went to boarding school in Christchurch at Rangi Ruru Girls' School. When World War II broke out, she returned to Franz Josef and helped her family run the hotel until they decided to sell the business in 1947.

From 1947 to 1949, Fletcher studied horticulture at Massey Agricultural College, then returned to Franz Josef and worked at the post office, Department of Conservation office and the hotel. In the late 1970s she was appointed Westland National Park historian and developed a collection of historical items and records covering the development of the area and its people. The collection was later donated to the Hokitika Museum. Fletcher also compiled her father's mountaineering photographs into the Alec Graham Photographic Collection and donated this to the Macmillan Brown Library at the University of Canterbury.

=== Recognition ===
In 2017, a tuatara on public display at Franz Josef was named Dorothy in honour of Fletcher.

== Personal life ==
Fletcher was married twice. In 1959 she married Peter King, an Englishman who emigrated to New Zealand and became a park ranger at Westland National Park. The couple had two children together, however King was killed in a car accident in 1962, days after the birth of their second child. In 1973, Fletcher married Peter Fletcher, chief ranger at Westland National Park. He died in 1977 on the Copland Pass.
