= Alison Preston-Thomas =

New Zealand netball player (1927–2020)

Personal information
- Full name: Alison Ruth Preston-Thomas (Née: Hughes)
- Born: 25 November 1927
- Died: 31 January 2020 (aged 92) Wellington, New Zealand
- Occupation: Schoolteacher
- Spouse: Grant Preston-Thomas (m. 1963; died 2013)
- School: Avonside Girls' High School

Netball career
- Playing positions: GS, GA
Years	National team	Caps
1948	New Zealand	3

Alison Ruth Preston-Thomas (née Hughes; 25 November 1927 – 31 January 2020) was a New Zealand netball player. She played in the New Zealand team in all three Tests against the touring Australian team in 1948.

== Early life ==
Preston-Thomas was born Alison Ruth Hughes on 25 November 1927. She was educated at Avonside Girls' High School in Christchurch, where she was senior tennis champion in 1945. She trained as a teacher at the Dunedin Training College in 1949.

== Netball career ==
Hughes was a stalwart of the Canterbury provincial netball team for many years, including a period as captain of the side. She represented Otago for one year, in 1949, while a student at the teachers' college in Dunedin. She was described as a "particularly bright exponent of the game", with her "speed and handling being first-rate".

After the 1947 national championships, won by Canterbury, Hughes was selected for the New Zealand team to play the visiting Australian team the following year. Subsequently, she was chosen as one of the two players to appear in all three Test matches against Australia in 1948. New Zealand lost the first Test at Forbury Park in Dunedin 16–27, with Hughes reported to have "scored some fine goals in the face of disturbing resistance". In the second Test in New Plymouth, New Zealand lost 13–44, although it was said that Hughes' play "would have been brilliant but for the sterling defence work by the Australians". The third Test in Auckland was won by Australia, 44–22.

In 1949, Hughes was part of the Otago team that finished third at the national provincial championships, and was said to be in "excellent form" in the match to decide third place against Wellington that was won by Otago 17–10.

Hughes was back playing for Canterbury at the 1950 national championships, with Canterbury beating Auckland in the final 22–7. She was subsequently named in the South Island team for the interisland match, which was won by the South Island 17–16.

== Later life and death ==
Hughes was a physical education teacher at Avonside Girls' High School for many years. She married Grant Preston-Thomas, an engineer, in about 1963, and the couple had two children. In his retirement, Grant Preston-Thomas was noted as one of a group of volunteers that developed walking tracks in the bush-covered hills around Wellington. He died of cancer in 2013. Alison Preston-Thomas died in Wellington on 31 January 2020, aged 92.
