= John Fisher (New Zealand politician) =

New Zealand politician

John Fisher (1837 – 13 January 1927) was a member of the New Zealand Legislative Council from 14 July 1914 to 13 July 1921, when his term ended. He was appointed by the Reform Government.

Fisher was from Cambridge. He died at his home at Pukerimu, near Cambridge, on 13 January 1927.
