= Robert Allan (businessman) =

New Zealand businessman and manufacturer

Robert Allan (1847 – 8 December 1927) was a prominent businessman and manufacturer of Christchurch, New Zealand.

== Early life ==
Allan's parents arrived in New Zealand aboard the Thomas Harrison in 1842. Born in Nelson in 1847, Allan and his family moved to Wellington for several years and to Port Levy in 1851. The Allan family later settled in Lyttelton. Robert's father (also Robert) and uncle Magnus Allan were in business with John Grubb and notably were commissioned to construct the Canterbury Association wharf at Lyttelton for Captain Joseph Thomas.

== Early career ==
Allan was educated at the Church of England School under later at the Scots School. Joining the firm of J. T. Peacock & Co. at 15, Allan began a prosperous mercantile career. In the early 1870s he founded together with Mr Lightband, the boot and shoe manufacturers and general importers Lightband, Allan & Co. This firm later became the national concern of Skelton, Frostick and Co. Ltd which was famous for manufacturing Zealandia brand boots. In 1895 the firm erected a substantial four story brick building in Hereford Street, Christchurch which was the largest boot factory in the Colony. After Allan's retirement and subsequent death, Skelton Frostick fell victim to the difficult conditions of the Great Depression and was liquidated in the 1930s.

== Involvement with Christchurch civic life ==
In 1900, Allan was president of both the Industrial Association and of the Jubilee Exhibition committee for Canterbury. He was appointed a Royal Reception Commissioner for the visit of the 1901 visit of the Duke and Duchess of Cornwall and York (later King George V and Queen Mary) along with Sir Henry Wigram and Mr. Stead. Allan was also active in the Canterbury Chamber of Commerce, and one of the earliest members and the first treasurer of Christchurch's Union Rowing Club. He was a longtime director of the Kaiapoi Woollen Company, as well as electric lighting and tramway enterprises.

Allan, in personal capacity and in his role as director was heavily involved in the promotional exhibitions of New Zealand made products. As President of the Industrial Association (1879-1881) he presided over the first Christchurch Industrial Exhibition in 1880. He was on the committee of the 1883 exhibition and in 1895 Robert had been elected a life member of the Association. He was appointed chairman of the Early History Committee of the Association. In 1900 Allan was President of both the Industrial Association and of the 1900 Jubilee Exhibition Committee.

Allan's role and experience in exhibitions made him a natural choice for one of the Executive Commissioners of the New Zealand International Exhibition in 1906. G. S. Munro has been named as Government representative and Chairman of commissioners and Robert Allan named Vice-Chairman. Other commissioners included Sir John Hall (Mayor of Christchurch) and Mr. William Reece (ex-Mayor). It appears that Munro's dictatorial approach and treatment of his fellow commissioners took a serious toll on the organising committee and it is likely that in frustration Allan withdrew from the commission, sighting ill health as the reason. The Colonist of 11 August 1906 stated that Sir Joseph Ward had accepted Robert Allan's resignation. Though careful not to ascribe outright blame to Munro, the media were not fooled by the Allan's diplomatic resignation and pursued the matter that became known as "The Exhibition Trouble.’ `Sir Joseph Ward was forced to investigate the matter further.

== Family life ==
On 14 April 1869 Allan was married to Martha Haswell Wood at St Michael's Church, Merivale by the Very Rvd. Dean Jacobs. The couple had five daughters and two sons. In 1881 Allan had purchased Glenmore in Hillsborough, Opawa from John Chapman who had bought the house the previous year from John Barton Arundel Acland of Mt Peel station. The house was built for Henry Selfe who was agent for the Canterbury Association but was rarely used by the first owner himself. Today, Glenmore is a Category II listed home by the New Zealand Historic Places Trust.

Allan later purchased Abberley in Springfield Avenue, St Albans, Christchurch. Abberley had been built in 1863 by well known importer and merchant Thomas James Maling (1836-1922). It was a substantial home with vast gardens — including a caged cherry orchard. The two hectare private garden is today the grounds of Abberley Park. The house was demolished in the 1930s after the City Council purchased the property. Allan also owned rural land in Canterbury, Northland and a 1,500-acre (610 ha) sawmill at Tarawhiti. One of the properties at Nukutawhiti, Whangārei, was farmed by his son Robert S Allan. Robert Allan was staying at Nukatawhiti, his son's sheep station in Northland, at the time of his death in 1927. Martha and Robert Allan are buried in the Bromley Cemetery, Christchurch.
