= Lake Ayson =

New Zealand farm labourer, fisheries inspector (1855–1927)

Lake Falconer Ayson (7 June 1855 – 17 June 1927) was a New Zealand farm labourer, rabbit inspector, acclimatisation officer and fisheries inspector. He was born in Warepa, near Balclutha in South Otago, New Zealand, on 7 June 1855.
