= John Hickman (meteorologist) =

New Zealand meteorologist (1927–2014)

John Sedgley Hickman QSO (9 September 1927 – 13 December 2014) was a New Zealand meteorologist, and was the director of the New Zealand Meteorological Service between 1977 and 1988.

== Biography ==
Born in Whanganui in 1927, Hickman grew up in rural Northland until his family moved to Auckland in 1941. After finishing his secondary education there, he completed a building apprenticeship and at the same time studied mathematics, physics and geology part-time. He then moved to Dunedin, and studied at the University of Otago, from where he graduated with a Bachelor of Science in 1951.

Hickman joined the New Zealand Meteorological Service, rising to become its director in 1977. He remained in that role until his retirement in 1988. He served as vice-president of Regional Association V of the World Meteorological Organization from 1982 to 1986, and president from 1986 to 1988.

In the 1989 Queen's Birthday Honours, Hickman was appointed a Queen's Service Order for public services, and the following year he was awarded an honorary DSc by Victoria University of Wellington. He was also awarded the New Zealand 1990 Commemoration Medal, and in 1998 he was made an honorary member of the Meteorological Society of New Zealand.

Hickman also served as the convenor of the climate committee of the Royal Society of New Zealand until 1994.

He died in 2014.
