= Donald Coleman (cricketer) =

New Zealand cricketer (1927–1983)

Personal information
- Full name: Donald Dacre Coleman
- Born: 20 May 1927; Devonport, Auckland, New Zealand
- Died: 15 August 1983 (aged 56); Devonport, Auckland, New Zealand
- Batting: Right-handed
- Relatives: Ces Dacre (uncle)

Domestic team information
- Years: Team
- 1948/49–1957/58: Auckland

Career statistics
Competition	First-class
Matches	31
Runs scored	1,212
Batting average	22.03
100s/50s	0/7
Top score	87
Catches/stumpings	14/–
- Source: ESPNcricinfo, 5 June 2016

Donald Dacre Coleman (20 May 1927 – 15 August 1983) was a New Zealand cricketer. He played 31 first-class matches for Auckland between 1948 and 1958.

Coleman was born in the Auckland suburb of Devonport and educated at Takapuna Grammar School. His uncle was the New Zealand cricketer Ces Dacre.

Coleman made his first-class debut in the 1948–49 Plunket Shield. The Australian captain Bill Brown praised Coleman's batting after he made 30 and 41 at number three for Auckland against the touring Australians in 1949–50. After early success, when he was considered a potential Test player, his form faded and he lost his place in the Auckland team. He returned for one final season in 1957–58, making his highest first-class score of 87 as an opening batsman against Otago in the opening match of the Plunket Shield.
