= William Allan Armour =

New Zealand school principal and educationalist

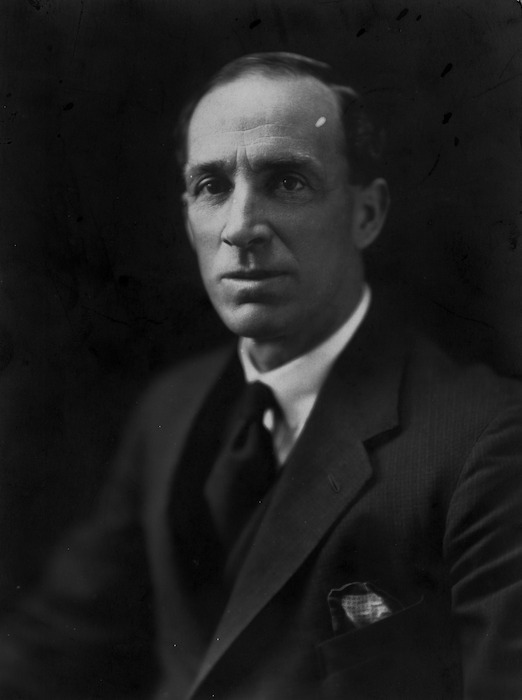
- Born: 30 April 1880; Dunedin, New Zealand
- Died: 21 April 1967 (aged 86); Napier, New Zealand
- Education: University of Otago

William Allan Armour (30 April 1880–21 April 1967) was a New Zealand school principal and educationalist.

== Biography ==
William Armour was born in Dunedin on 30 April 1880, to Scottish immigrants Elizabeth Allan and her husband, Hugh Armour. He attended Otago Boys' High School, Dunedin Training College and the University of Otago, graduating in 1902 with an MA with honours. Armour taught at schools in Dunedin, Wanganui and Invercargill, before being made director of Wanganui Technical College in 1911. That year he also received an MSc and in 1912 married Margaret Stevenson with whom he would have six children. Armour later became headmaster of Napier Boys' High School in 1915 and then headmaster of Wellington College in 1927. He was also a member of the Victoria University College Council from 1939 to 1941 and a member of the Senate of the University of New Zealand from 1942 to 1948. Armour retired at the end of 1942 and returned to Napier where he died on 21 April 1967.
