= Reg King (footballer) =

New Zealand footballer

Personal information
- Full name: Reginald Arthur King
- Date of birth: 31 August 1927
- Place of birth: Auckland, New Zealand
- Date of death: 21 August 2009 (aged 81)
- Place of death: Auckland, New Zealand
- Position: Forward

Senior career*
Years	Team	Apps	(Gls)
- Eastern Suburbs

International career
1954	New Zealand	1	(1)
- * Club domestic league appearances and goals

Reginald Arthur King (31 August 1927 – 21 August 2009) was an association football player who represented New Zealand at international level.

== Club career ==
King won six Auckland championships with Eastern Suburbs and won the Chatham Cup in 1951 and 1953, and was a losing finalist in 1955. He scored a hat-trick in the 1951 final.

== International career ==
King was part of the 1954 New Zealand side which toured Australia. After being left out of the starting XI for the first game against a State side, he was given his chance against an Australian select XI in the second, and duly delivered with hat-trick in the 3-0 win. King's performance earned him a start for his only official A-international appearance for New Zealand. King scored the first of New Zealand's goals, Charlie Steele, Jr. the other in the 2-1 victory over Australia on 14 August 1954. King suffered a knee injury late in the first half and was unable to take any further part in the tour. Including unofficial matches, King played 6 times for New Zealand, scoring eight goals.
