= Edmond Slattery =

New Zealand swagger and rural labourer

Ned "The Shiner" Slattery
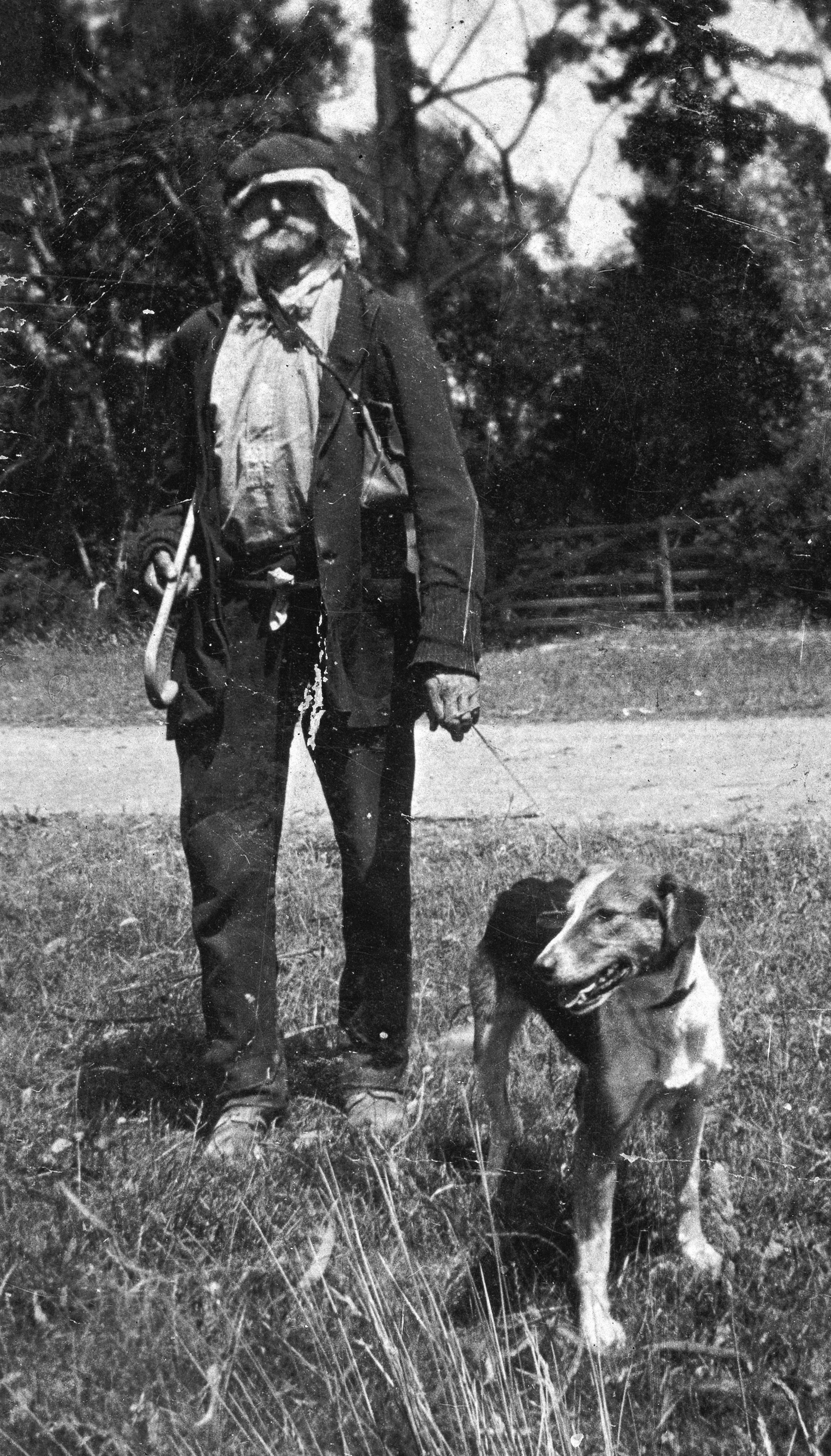
- Ned Slattery and his dog, circa 1920
- Born: Edmond Slattery c.1839 County Clare, Ireland
- Died: 11 August 1927 (aged 87); Dunedin, New Zealand
- Burial place: Andersons Bay Cemetery, Dunedin
- Other names: The Shiner, Shiner Slattery
- Occupations: Swagger, rural labourer

Edmond (Ned) Slattery (c.1839 – 11 August 1927), known as "The Shiner", was a notable New Zealand swagger and rural labourer. He was born in County Clare, Ireland in about 1839. He emigrated to Australia in 1869 and worked on the goldfields. In the early 1870s he came to new Zealand where his main area of living was Canterbury, Southland and Otago. He was famous at tricking publicans (and others) for drinks and such stories concerning "The Shiner" are numerous. He was known as a great "character" and his arrival in towns was often noted in local newspapers. He was well known for dancing the Irish Jig in competitions at the New Year in Oamaru. Despite being a swagger he kept up a dignified attire and was a regular Catholic church-goer. He died in a charity home in Dunedin in 1927.

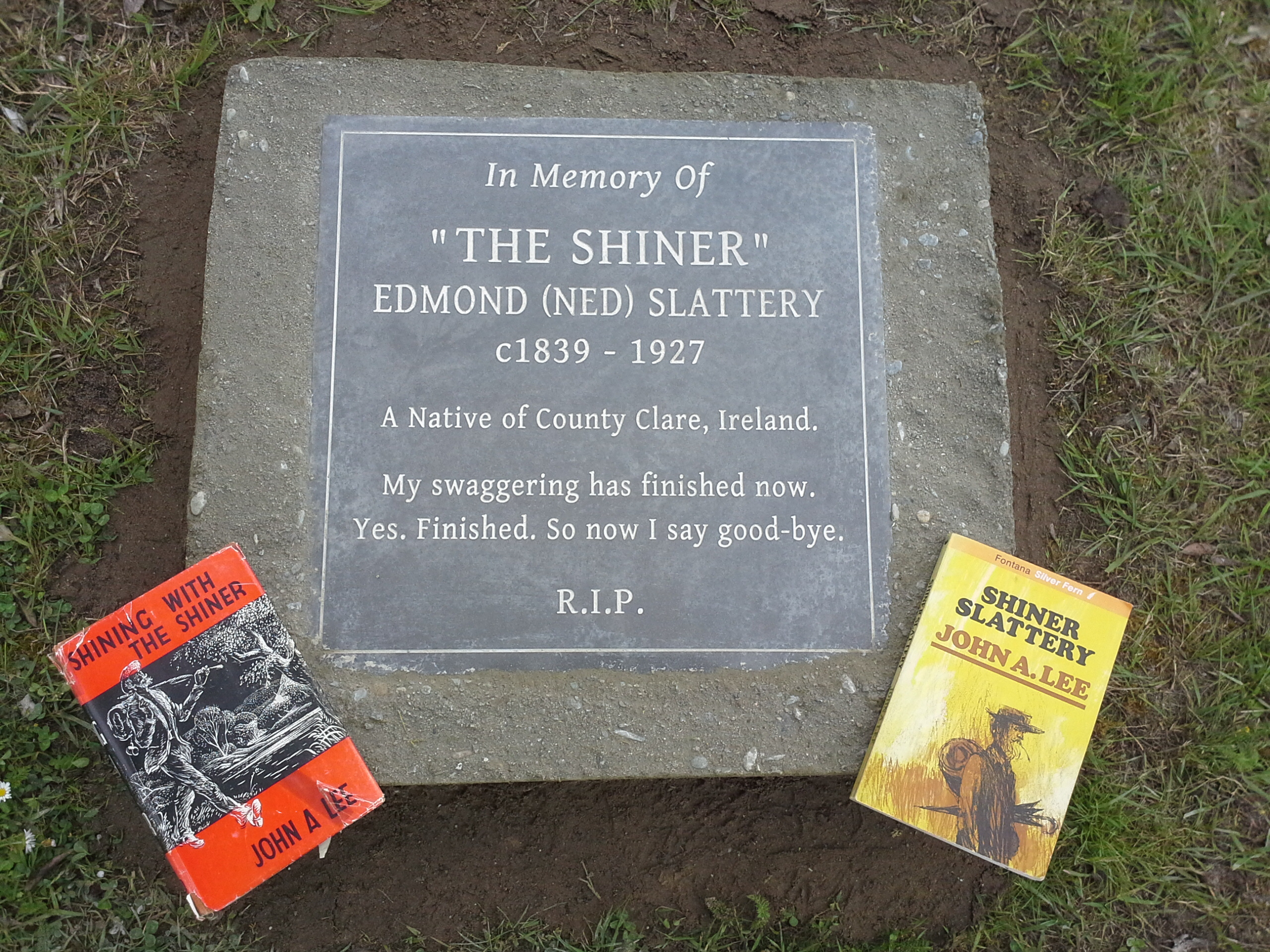
"The Gravestone on Edmond Slattery's Grave at Anderson's Bay Cemetery, with copies of books relating to him"
