= Oscar Alpers =

New Zealand writer, educator, and lawyer

Oscar Thorwald Johan Alpers (28 January 1867 – 21 November 1927) was a New Zealand teacher, journalist, writer, poet, lawyer, and justice of the New Zealand Supreme Court. He was born in Copenhagen, Denmark, on 28 January 1867. He was educated at Napier High School.
