= Bob Walls =

New Zealand painter (1927–1999)

Robert Walls
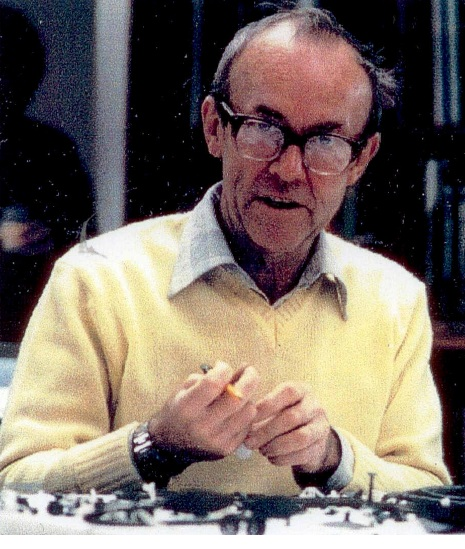
- Born: Robert Guy Walls; 8 June 1927; Upper Hutt, New Zealand
- Died: 11 November 1999 (aged 72); London, United Kingdom
- Education: Chelsea School of Art
- Known for: Painting

Robert “Bob” Guy Walls (8 June 1927 – 11 November 1999) was a painter born in Upper Hutt, New Zealand.

After finishing his education at Wellington College, Walls worked for the Union Steamship Company. He spent 17 years (1943 to 1960) employed by the shipping company, including 12 years at sea as a purser on ships trading mainly between New Zealand and Canada, and as shipping representative in Tonga and the Cook Islands. It was during this time that he began painting as a hobby.

Walls arrived in London in 1960, and subsequently studied at the Chelsea School of Art (1960–1963). His first solo exhibition was in 1964 at the Drian Galleries in London. He painted full-time for many years, along with some lecturing and teaching.

By the 1970s, Walls was finally obliged to obtain employment to ease the insecurity of living off an artist’s income. He worked briefly at the Foreign Office, and then at the British Museum. Here, he worked as a curator until 1992 in the Prehistoric and Romano-British Departments, among other things being involved with arrangements for the famous Lindow Man and in displaying the Vindolanda Tablets, the earliest written materials yet found in Britain. Walls held many exhibitions in Europe, the United Kingdom and New Zealand, and his works are in numerous collections both public and private, including those of the Contemporary Art Society and the New Zealand National Gallery.

== Painting ==
Walls painted using various media, including oils, water colour and pastels, and gouache. His works are typically of land, sea and townscapes, the landscapes being mainly those of Yorkshire, Scotland, Spain and New Zealand.

== Personal life ==
Walls lived much of his adult life in London, with his partner John McLeod.
