= Colin Franklin (engineer) =

Canadian engineer

Colin Athol Franklin CM FRSC is an engineer and a leading pioneer in Canada's space programme. He played a leading role in the design, construction and application of Canada's first satellite, the Alouette. His extensive work and contribution to Canadian research and industrial development activities in space-related research and manufacturing, have been a significant influence in establishing Canada as a world leader in these fields.

== Early life and education ==
Colin Franklin was born in Hastings, New Zealand, in 1927. He was a Physics lecturer at Auckland University in 1952 and a member of the Scientific Defence Corps, Royal New Zealand Air Force from 1953 to 1959.

In 1953, he received an M.Sc. in Physics from the University of Auckland and in 1957 he received a Ph.D. in Electrical Engineering from the Imperial College of Science and Technology, London.

== Career ==
In 1957, Colin Franklin joined the Defence Research Telecommunications Establishment (DRTE) in Ottawa. He was chief electrical engineer for Canada's first satellite, the Alouette 1, designated by the Centennial Engineering Board of Canada in January 1987 as one of the ten most outstanding achievements of Canadian engineering of the past 100 years. He was subsequently chief engineer for the ISIS series of scientific satellites and head of the Space Electronics Laboratory at DRTE.

In 1969 he transferred to the newly created Department of Communications in Ottawa and from 1970 to 1975 was Project manager for the communications technology satellite Hermes. In 1976 he carried out a study and produced the DOC report which led in 1978 to the signing of an Agreement for cooperation between Canada and the European Space Agency (ESA). In 1976 he was posted to the ESA HQ in Paris where he worked for a year in the Department of Future Programs and Plans. In 1977 he returned to Canada as Director General of Space Programs and subsequently Director General of Space and Information Technology Programs in the Department of Communications. His responsibilities included space industry support, planning and management of the Canadian mobile satellite program and Canada's participation in European communications satellite programs as well as the concluding phases of the Federal governments Office Communications and Videotex and Teletext programs. From 1986 to 1987 he moved to the Ministry of State for Science and Technology to assist in the drafting of a Cabinet submission for the establishment of a Canadian Space Agency and a long term space plan. The latter resulted in Canada's participation in the US Space Station Program, and approval to proceed with the MSAT and Radarsat programs. From 1987 to 1990 he was a Visiting Professor in the Electrical Engineering Department, the University of Auckland, New Zealand. From 1990 to 1992 he was Chief Scientist at Spar Aerospace Ltd at Sainte-Anne-de-Bellevue, Quebec, Quebec.

== Honours and awards ==
He was appointed to the Order of Canada in 1990. He is a Fellow of the Royal Society of Canada and Fellow of the City and Guilds Institute of London. He was the 1996 recipient of the annual Alouette Award from the Canadian Aeronautics and Space Institute. In 1994, on the 50th anniversary of the IEEE, Ottawa Section, he received the IEEE "Pioneers in Technology" Award for "Leadership in the establishment of Canada's satellite program". He was the 2002 recipient of the annual John H. Chapman Award of excellence from the Canadian Space Agency. The Award is the ultimate recognition of the individuals behind the Canadian Space program. The Award highlights an outstanding achievement, its socio-economic benefits and the recipient's merits.

In 1995 he was a member of the Canadian Space Agency's Blue Ribbon Review Team for Radarsat-1. In 1998 he participated in a top level risk assessment study for the Canadian Space Agency on industry proposals for the Radarsat-2 contract. In 2001 he was appointed to a three-member Advisory Committee to the Auditor General of Canada for the audit of the Canadian Space Agency. In 2008, he was awarded the Julian C. Smith Medal from the Engineering Institute of Canada as well as the IEEE Canada McNaughton Gold Medal.
