= John Branthwaite =

New Zealand priest (1927–2014)

John Walter Branthwaite (1 December 1927 – 30 January 2014) was a New Zealand Anglican priest in the second half of the twentieth century; and the first two decades of the 21st.

He was educated at the University of New Zealand and ordained in 1952. After a curacy in Invercargill he held incumbencies at Waitaki, Wakatipu, Opawa and Otipua. He was Archdeacon of Timaru from 1975 to 1977 when he was appointed Archdeacon of Akaroa.

He died on 30 January 2014.
