= Çanak =

Çanak may refer to:

- Cihan Çanak (born 2005), Belgian footballer
- Çanak Affair, 1922 Anglo-Turkish war scare
- Treaty of Çanak, 1809 treaty between the Ottoman Empire and Great Britain

== See also ==
- Čanak
- Çanakkale, municipality in Turkey
