= Canak =

Canak may refer to:

- Çanak (disambiguation), a Turkish term
- Čanak, a South Slavic term
