= Mihailo Čanak =

Mihailo Čanak Михаило Чанак
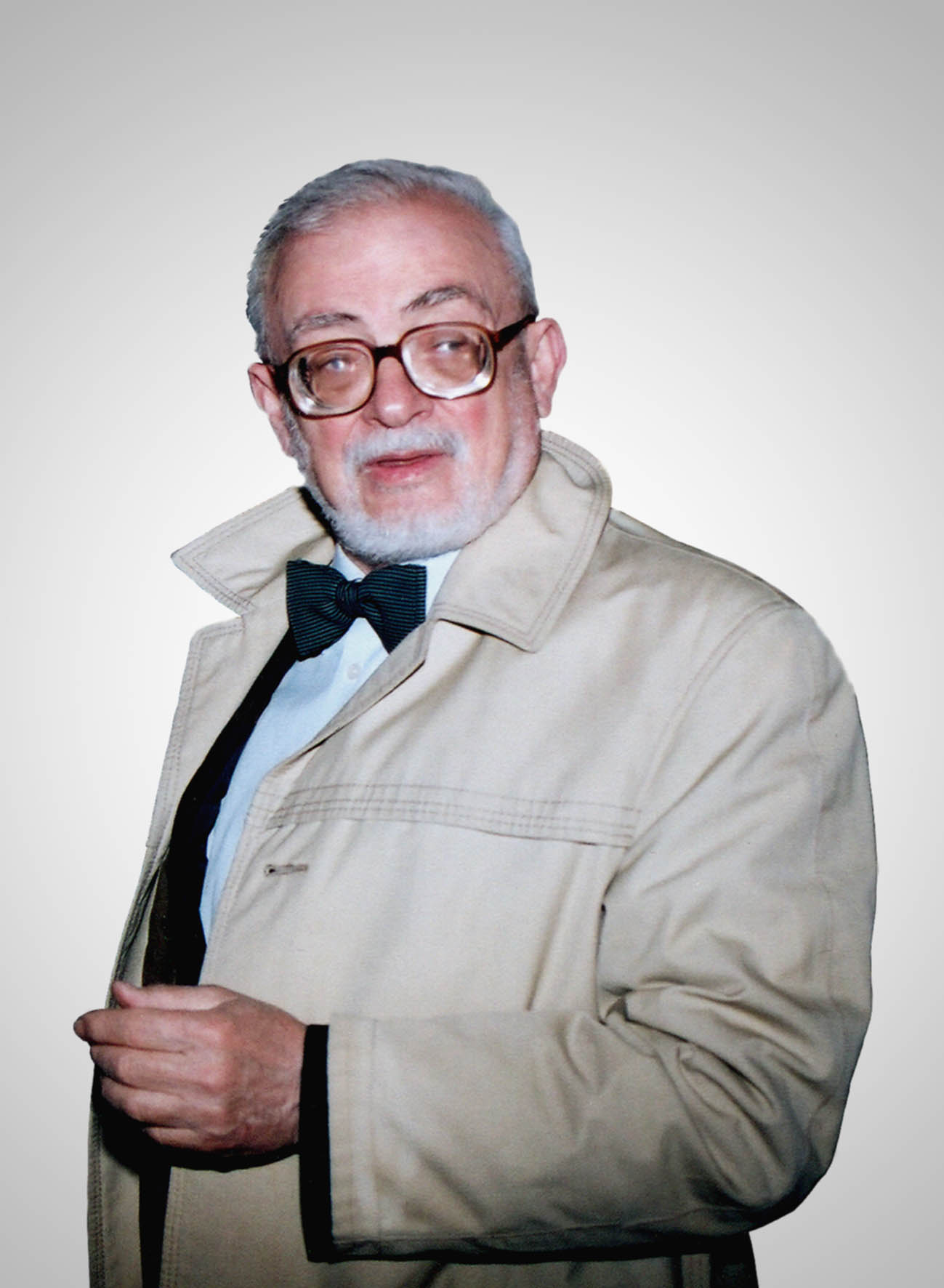
- Born: June 2, 1932 (age 93); Belgrade, Kingdom of Yugoslavia
- Died: 1 December 2014; Belgrade, Serbia
- Occupation: Architect
- Buildings: Block 21 (Novi Beograd), Liman I and II (Novi Sad), Kreativni centar (Belgrade), etc.

Mihailo Čanak (Serbian Cyrillic: Михаило Чанак) was a Serbian architect and researcher. He was born in Belgrade, on 2 June 1932. He is a founder and a board member of Center for Housing CS in Belgrade (Centar za stanovanje CS). He holds a PhD degree from the University of Belgrade Faculty of Architecture.

== Biography ==
Born on June 2, 1932, in Belgrade. Father Stevan (1899), mother Olga Dinić(1906). Graduated primary school and high school in Belgrade. Enrolled in the Faculty of Architecture in Belgrade in 1951, graduated in June, 1957, with average note 9.45. Got master's degree in 1975, at the 5th graduate course “Town Planning” at the Faculty of Architecture in Belgrade, with the thesis “Functional Aspects of the Organization of Apartments and their Influence on the Formation of Apartment Structures”, got PhD degree in 1984, at the same faculty, with the thesis “Evaluation of Quality of Housing Construction and of Life in Apartments”. Got the title of Senior Scientific Fellow in 1985, and of Scientific Advisor in 1993. Passed the State Examination in 1962. Graduated the specialized course “Prefabricated Building Construction” in Paris, in 1967. Married with Dr. Nada Čanak (Djuričin), ecologist (1935).. Son: Miloš, architect (1966).

Employed in 1957 in the Institute for Testing Materials of Serbia, where he was Director of the Center for Housing during the period 1970-1986. In 1986, joined the Institute for Architecture and Town Planning of Serbia, Director of that Institute until 1988. Stayed in the Institute as Scientific Advisor until retirement in 1999.

Since 1991 he opened, in Belgrade, together with his son Milos Canak, the Bureau for Architectural Design Research and Education “ARD” (Architectural Research and Design).

== Architectural design ==
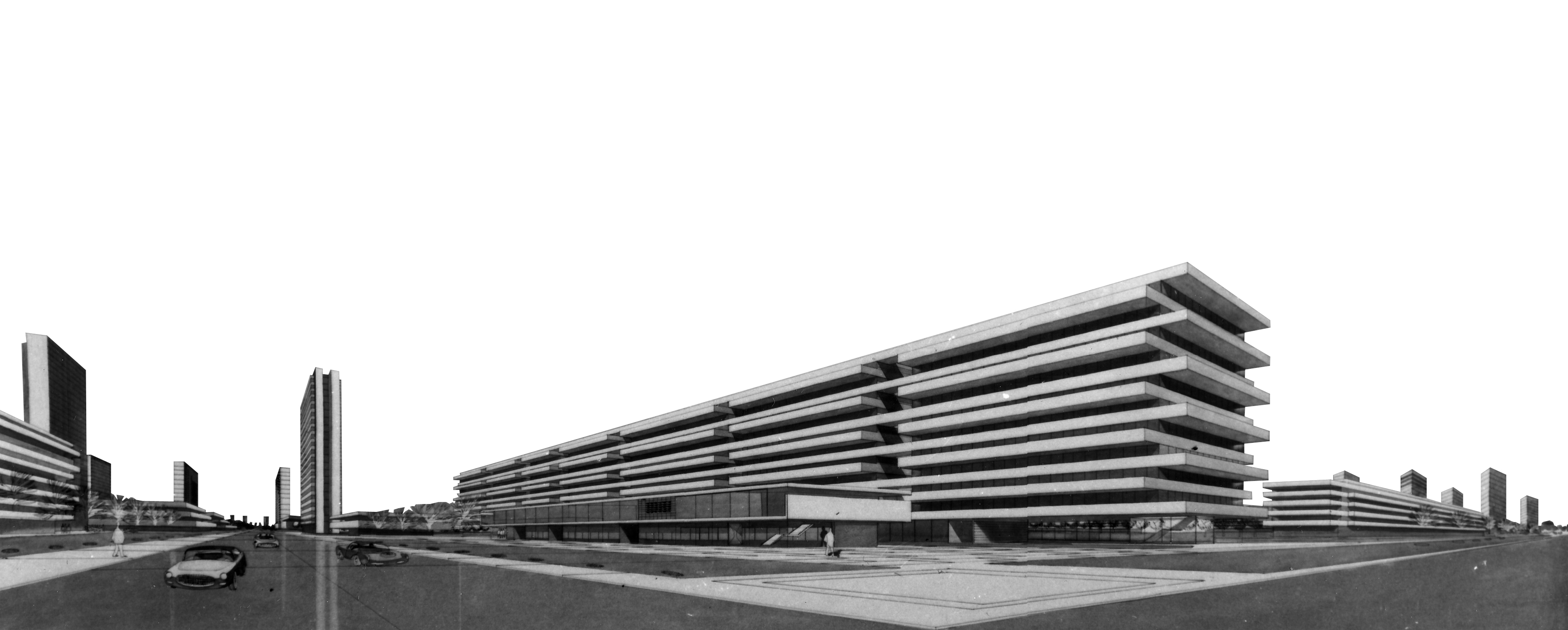
Housing and auxiliary buildings in block 21, New Belgrade, 1961-1963 (L.Lenarcic, M.Mitic, I.Petrovic and M.Canak)

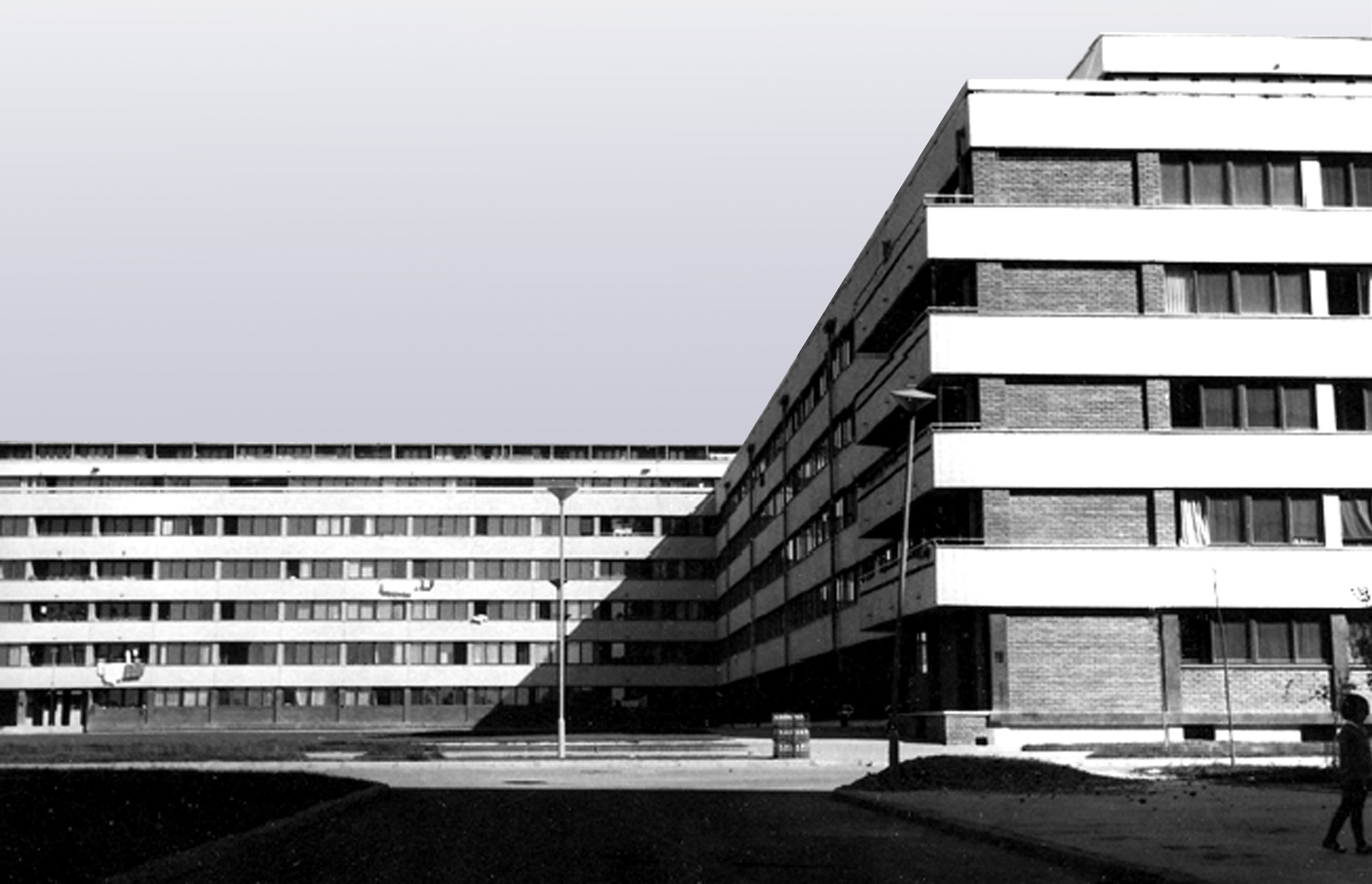
Housing and auxiliary buildings in block 21, New Belgrade, 1961-1963 (L.Lenarcic, M.Mitic, I.Petrovic and M.Canak)

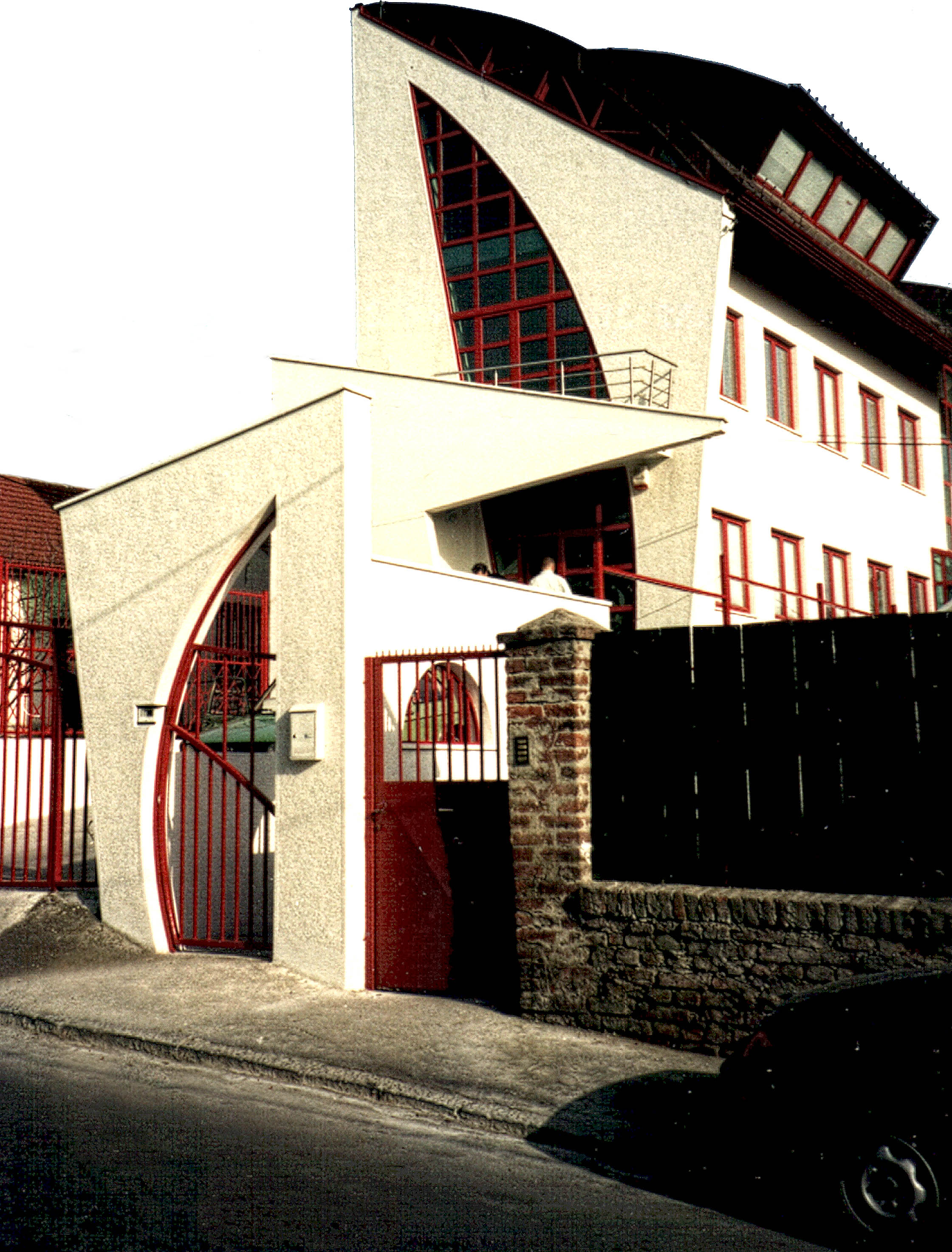
Headquarters of the publishing house Kreativni centar, Belgrade 2000-2002

During his design career, Čanak went through four basic stages, namely:

- 1957/70, International Style and Industrial Modernism (Alone or with the team of authors: I.Lenarčić, M.Mitić, I.Petrović and I.Simović).
- 1970/86, Late Modernism (Alone or with A.Djokić, P.Napijalo, D.Simić),
- 1986/90, Neo-vernacular architecture and Post-Modernism (Alone or with M.Čanak).
- from 1991, Neo-Modernism (Alone or with M.Čanak).

During the study, in 1953, Michael Čanak with four other colleagues and friends (L.Lenarčić, M.Mitić, I.Petrović and I.Simović), founded the group "Belgrade 5". Many awards and more realizations (two apartment buildings in Block 21 in Novi Beograd, Liman I and II in Novi Sad, etc.) marked the work of this group. This is also a first phase in the designing work of Michael Čanak, during which he will prove a vigorous supporter of functional minimalism, characteristic for the so-called, Industrial Modernism. This development phase, positioned between the Early Modernism, International style, and Late Modernism, without including the Postmodern experimentation, lasted up to 1970. (Blocks 29, 45 and 70 in New Belgrade, etc.). In the same period, along with planning activities, Čanak deals with scientific research in the field of housing quality.

The second phase in his designing opus is tied to the collaboration with architect Alexandar Djokić "with whom he thought in a similar manner, although their approaches were very different." This phase begins 1970th years, after winning 1st prizes at the competition for housing development Kijevo-Kneževac (implementation year 1971-80.). Since then Čanak soothes his minimalism and turned to „Articulated late Modern“ (settlement "Košutnjak" in Belgrade). In 1982, with P.Napijalo and D.Simić realized some housing group in the settlement "Bežanijska kosa" in Belgrade. In the same period Čanak become a master's degree (1975), he received his doctorate (1984), and received the title: Senior research associate. Since 1983 god. he organized and led "Preparatory course for the study of architecture", where pedagogical work (in addition to the design and scientific-research any) gets a special place in the list of his professional activities. In the framework of scientific research, Čanak is actively involved in the issue of evaluating the quality of housing and residential construction, In the period 1970-87 he participated in the Working Group on Construction CEE UN as a member of the Yugoslav delegation. He suggested the international project "Evaluating the quality of housing", which was accepted and implemented.

The third phase of Čanak's design work began in 1986. (When coming on the post of Director IAUS) and lasts until 1990. This is the period of his experimentation with so-called. Urban vernacular architecture (3 housing buildings in Loznica, Office building in Kraljevo, a green market in Banja Koviljača, the interior shops "Košuta" in Belgrade).

In 1991, Čanak with his son Miloš opened a private office "ARD" (Architectural Research & Design) and it is the beginning of the fourth phase in his designing opus. During that period Čanak returned to Neomodernism with some elements of Expressionism and Deconstruction (the building project "Creative Center" in Belgrade). In 1993 he received the title of Scientific Adviser. After son's going abroad, Michael Čanak in their activities giving priority to pedagogical work. Laminated theoretical and practical knowledge, but also his exceptional pedagogical abilities have contributed to "ARD" exchange gain reputation not only among young people who have been directed to study architecture, but also to larger circles of professionals.

=== Public competitions and competitions on invitation (selection) ===
- Medical centers in Croatia, Bosnia and Hercegovina (group of authors) 3rd and 4th prize, 1954.
- Design for the Square of killed warriors in Čanak (group of authors), 3rd prize, 1954.
- Central zone of New Belgrade (group of authors), 2nd increased prize and construction, 1958.
- Complex of the automobile company “Vojvodina”, Novi Sad (group of authors) divided 1st prize,1959
- Standard apartment buildings ZUKD Belgrade (group of authors), 1st, 2nd and 3rd prize, 1960.
- Block 29, New Belgrade, 1st prize, 1968.
- Block 22, New Belgrade (with M. Mitić), 3rd prize, 1968.
- Block 23, New Belgrade (with M. Mitić), 2nd prize, 1968.
- Three housing towers near the railway station in Novi Sad (with M. Mitić), 2nd prize, 1968.
- Area along the Vojvode Stepe Boulevard, Belgrade (group of authors), 3rd prize, 1969.
- Block 2 near the railway station, Novi Sad, 2nd increased prize, 1969
- Housing settlement Kijevo-Kneževac, Belgrade (with A. Djokić) 1971, etc.

=== Designs and constructions ===
- Housing and auxiliary buildings in block 21, New Belgrade (group of authors), appr. 1600 apartments, 1961/63.
- Apartment buildings in the areas Liman 1&2, Novi Sad, appr. 920 apartments 1962-65
- Apartment building in the housing area Slatina, Tuzla, appr. 200 apartments, 1965
- Apartment buildings in blocks 45 and 70, New Belgrade, appr. 800 apartments, 1968/72
- Apartment and auxiliary buildings in block 29, New Belgrade, 1100 apartments, (with M. Mitić) 1970-72
- Apartment buildings in block 2, near the railway station Novi Sad, appr. 800 apartments, 1969–72
- Housing area Kijevo-Kneževac in Belgrade (with A. Djokić), appr. 6000 apartments, 1971-80.
- Housing area Košutnjak in Belgrade (with A. Djokić), appr. 160 apartments 1981-83
- Apartment buildings in block 57 Bežanija, Belgrade (with D. Simić), 66 apartments, 1983–85
- Apartment buildings in Bežanija, Belgrade (with D. Simić and P. Napijalo) 1st phase, 300 apartments, 1982–85
- Apartment buildings in Cara Lazara street, Loznica, appr. 133 apartments, 1990–92
- Farmers’ market in Banja Koviljača, 1990
- Catalogue of standard individual apartment houses according to the “Ecodomus” system (with M. Čanak), 1992
- Enlargement of a number of previously built (by the author) apartment buildings, Novi Sad, 1997–99
- Headquarters of the publishing house “Kreativni centar”, Belgrade 2000-2002.

== Research work ==
While working at the Institute for Material Testing of Serbia, Čanak noted that many, then valid, principles in the design of dwellings are not sufficiently scientifically based, so that Čanak a part of its activities focused on scientific research in the field of habitology. In addition to several partial studies, his work is mainly focused in three directions:

- The quality and usability of housing and residential buildings
- Impact of structural systems in the utility value of dwellings and residential buildings
- Quantitative evaluation of the quality of housing and residential construction..

== Bibliography ==
- Čanak, Mihailo. Otvoren li zatvoren stan. Arhitektura i urbanizam, br. 38 (2012), str. 66-77.
- Čanak, Mihailo. Funkcionalni aspekti organizacije stana. Beograd, Centar za stanovanje IMS, 1974.
- Čanak, Mihailo. Topčiderska pozornica arh. Rajka Tatića u Beogradu. Izgradnja, vol. 58, br. 8-9 (2004), str. 219-227.
- Čanak, Mihailo. Upravna zgrada izdavačke kuće 'Kreativni centar', Beograd. Izgradnja, vol. 56, br. 6 (2002), str. 173-177.
- Čanak, Mihailo. Otvoreni i zatvoreni stan on YouTube. lecture at Architectural Faculty at University of Belgrade, 20 November 2012.
- Čanak, Mihailo. Centar za stanovanje - IMS on YouTube. lecture at Faculty of architecture, University of Belgrade, March 17, 2010.
- Čanak, Mihailo. Mala priča o zaboravljenim Beogradskih 5. ARD Review, br. 33 (2005), Beograd, str. 20-29.
- Čanak, Mihailo. Dimenzionisanje prostorija i prostora u stanu. ARD Review (Beograd), br.24 (2002), str. 28-37. i br.25 (2002), str. 31-40.
- Čanak, Mihailo. Masovna nadgradnja kao degenerativni faktor urbane rekonstrukcije. Izgradnja, vol. 57, br. 5 (2003), str. 145-156.
- Čanak, Mihailo. Standardi minimalnog kvaliteta u stambenoj izgradnji. ARD Review (Beograd), br.27 (2002), str. 37-46.

== Art Gallery ==
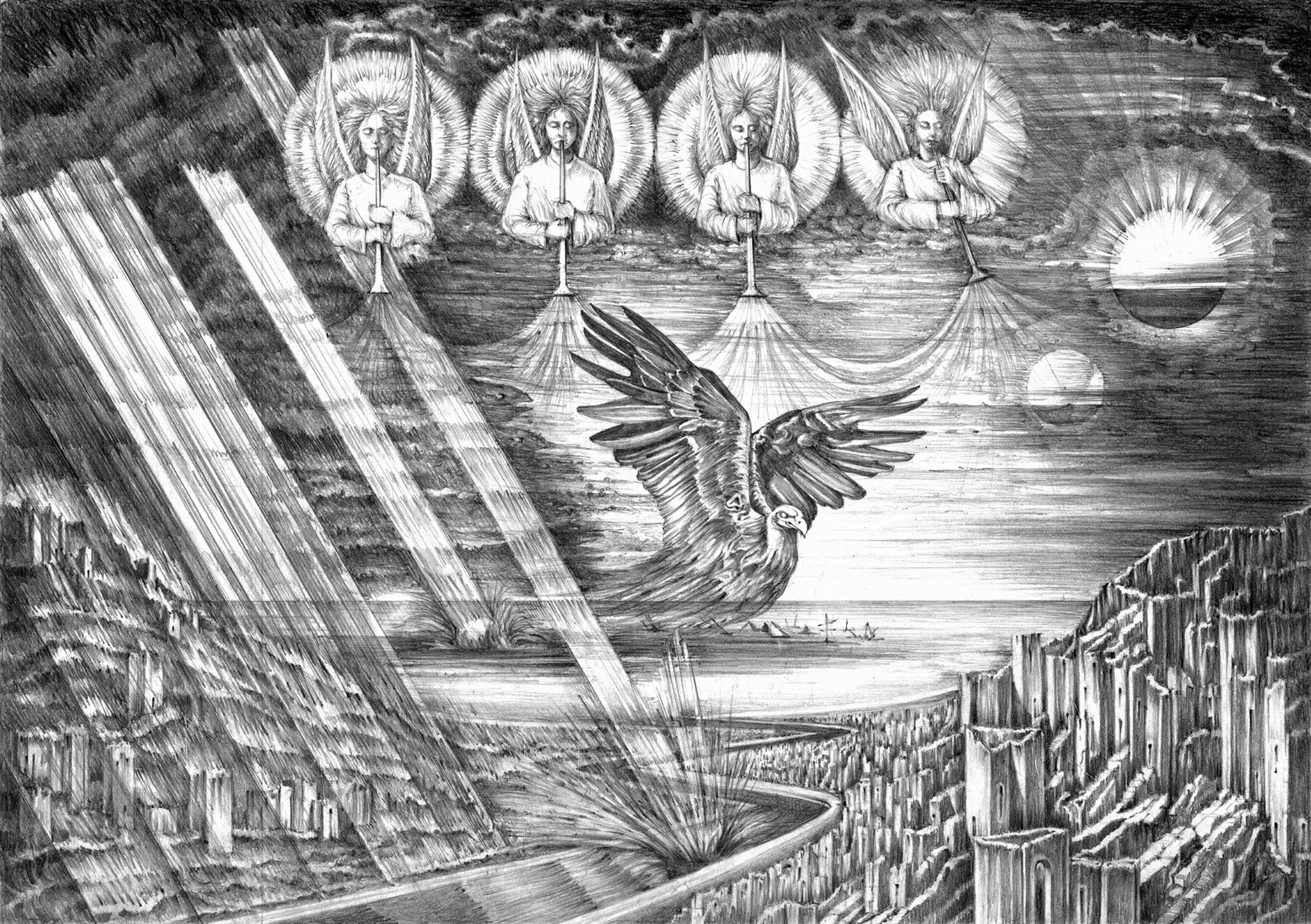
Apocalypse 01, drawing, 70x50cm, 2007.

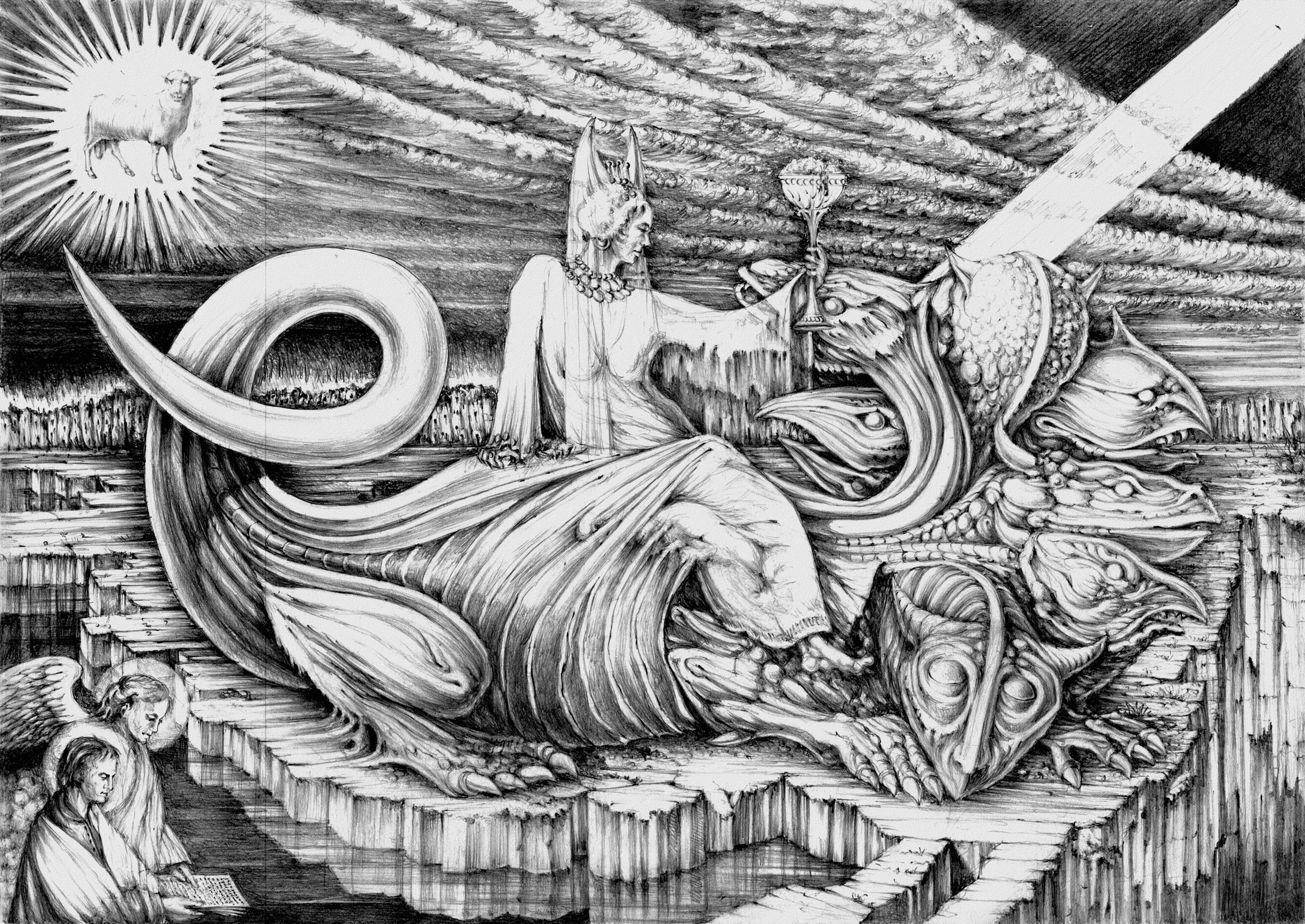
Apocalypse 02, drawing, 70x50cm, 2007.

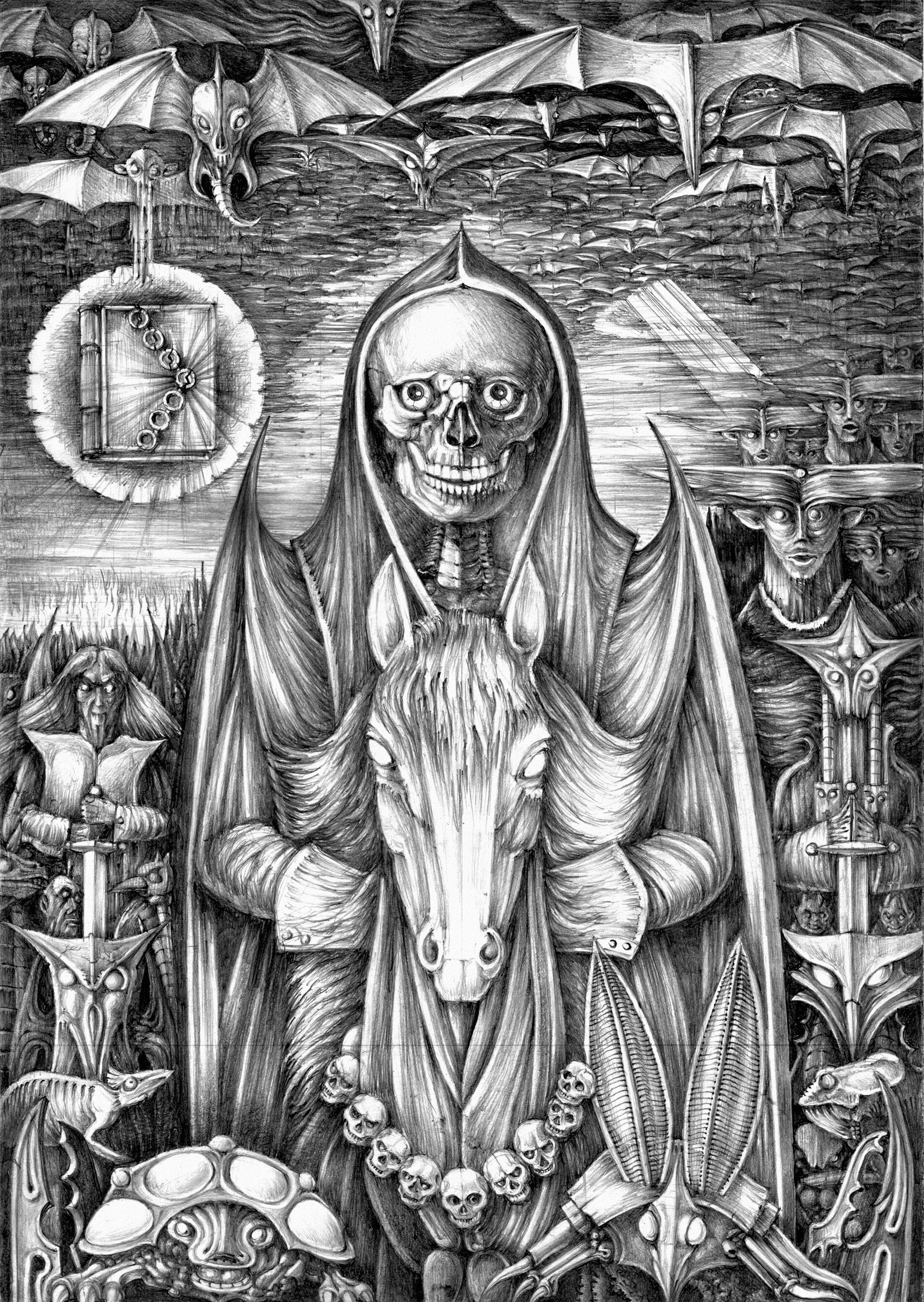
Apocalypse 03, drawing, 50x70cm, 2007.

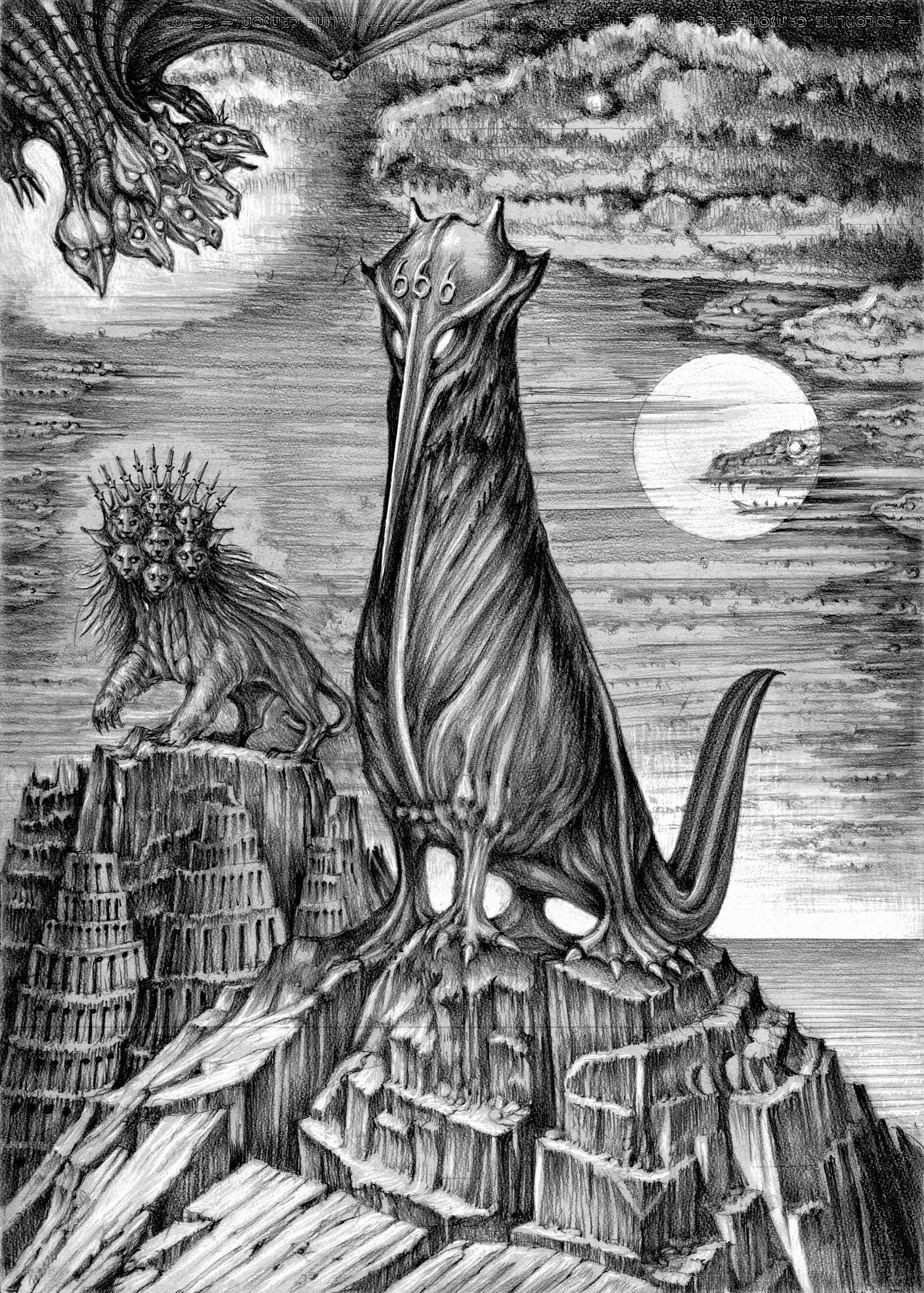
Apocalypse 04, drawing, 50x70cm, 2007.

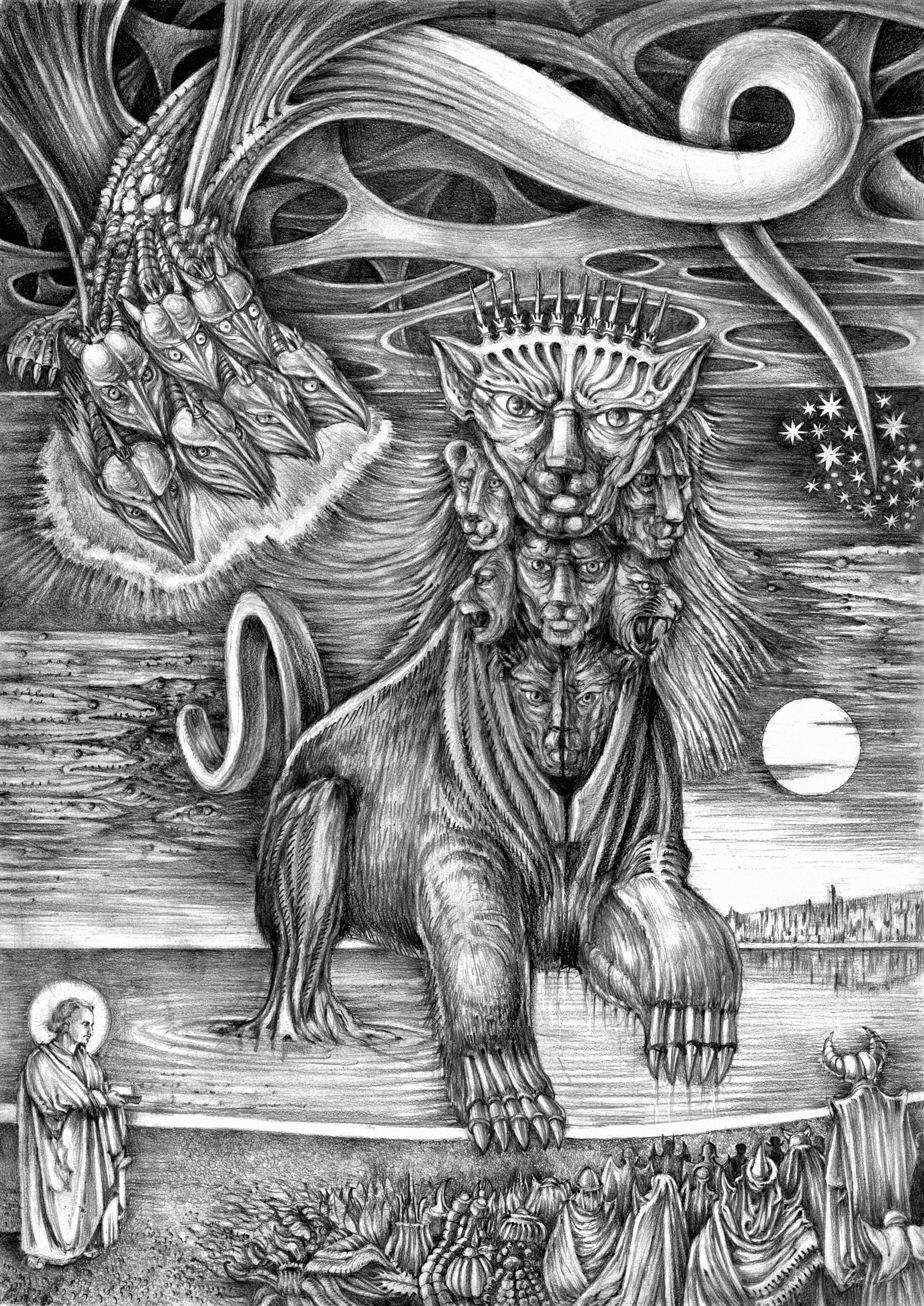
Apocalypse 05, drawing, 50x70cm, 2007.

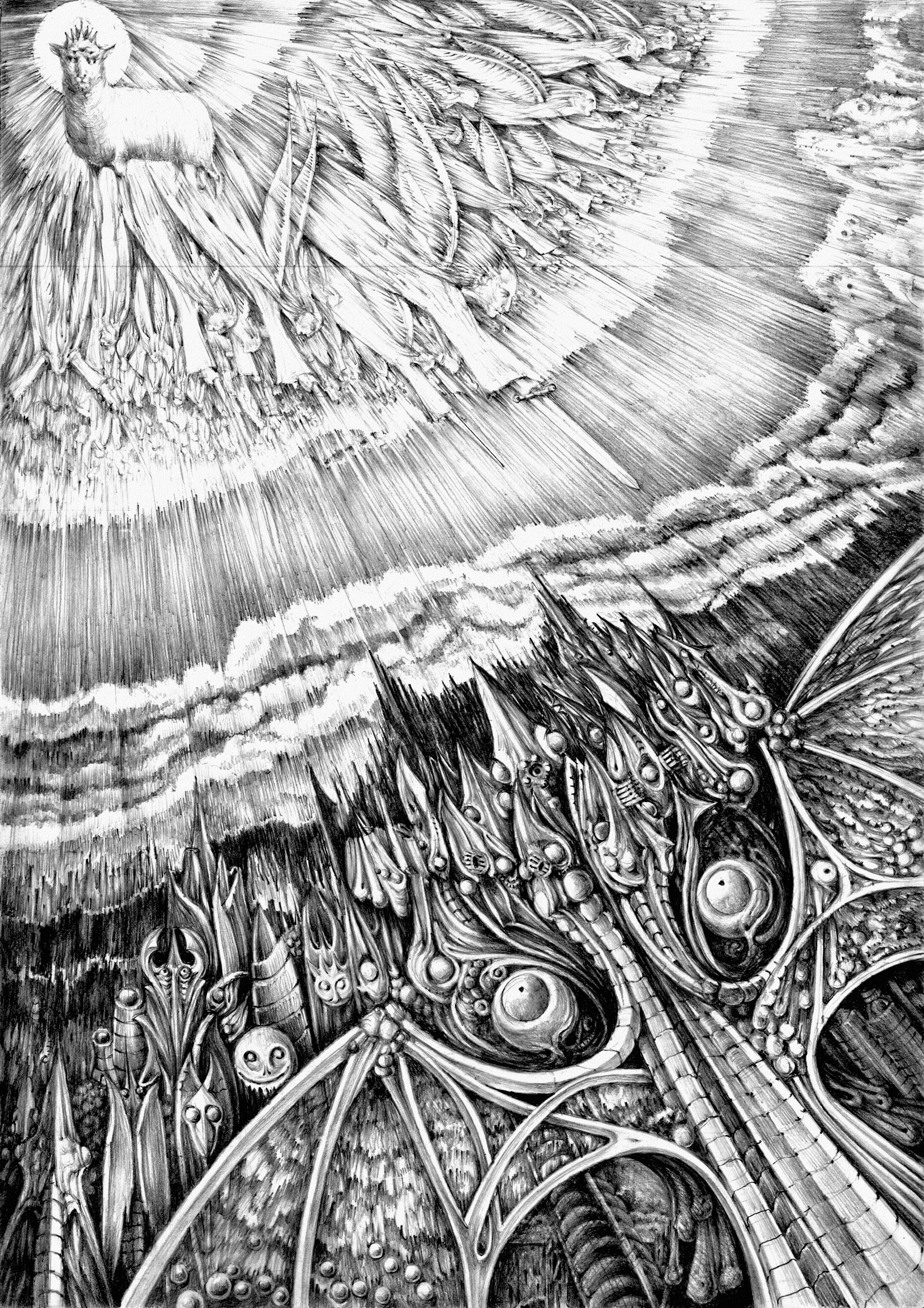
Apocalypse 06, drawing, 50x70cm, 2007.

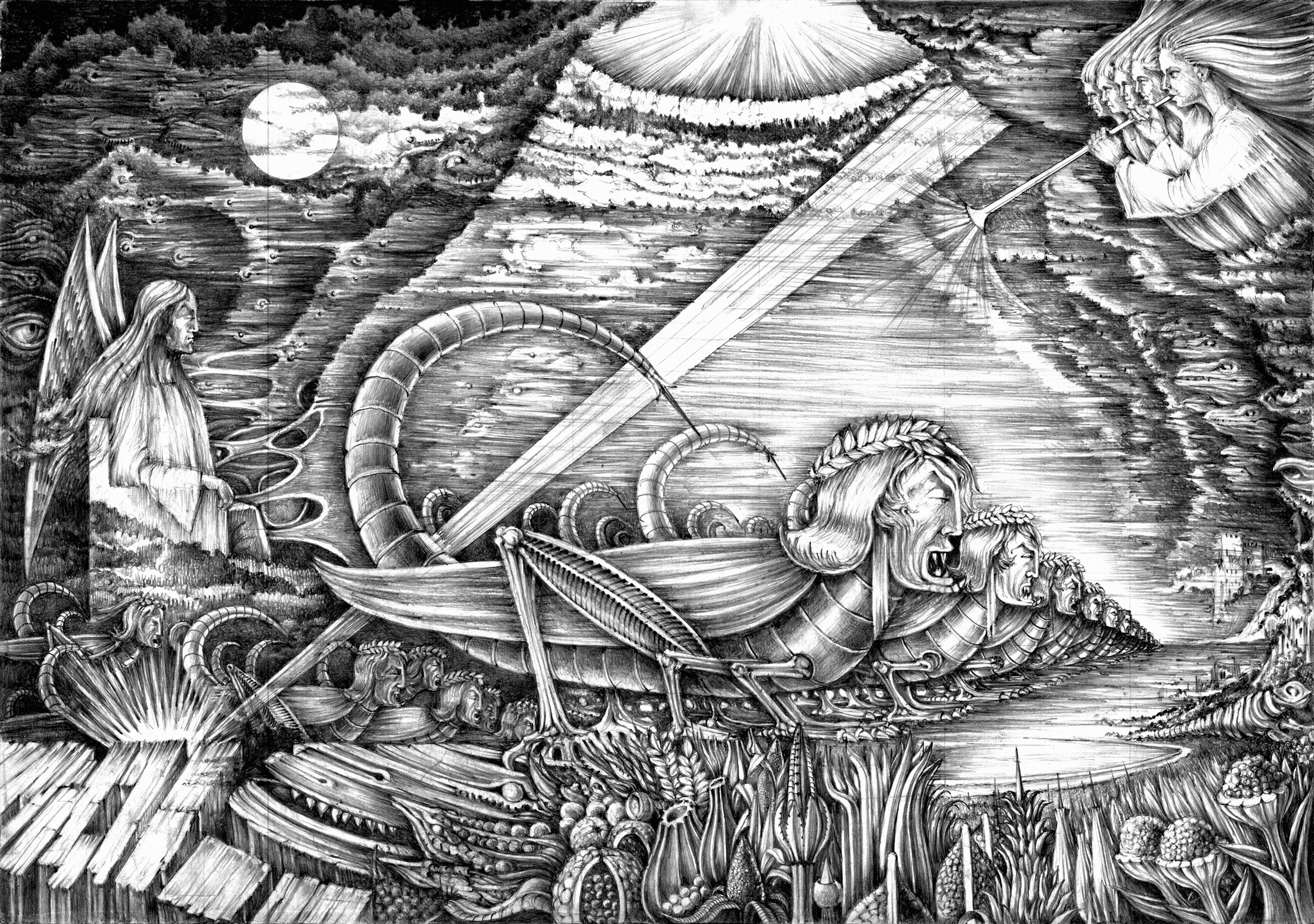
Apocalypse 07, drawing, 70x50cm, 2007.

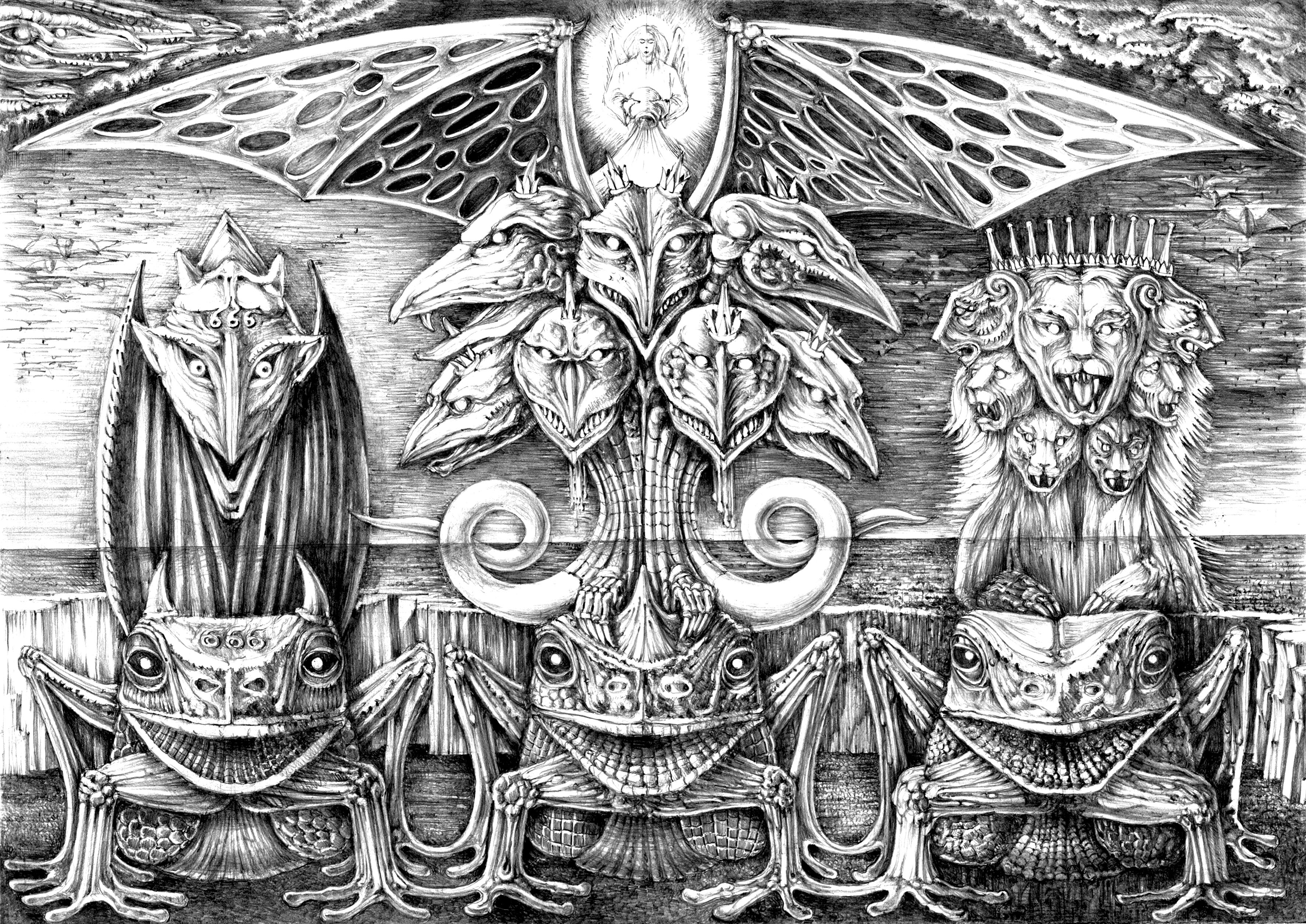
Apocalypse 08, drawing, 70x50cm, 2007.

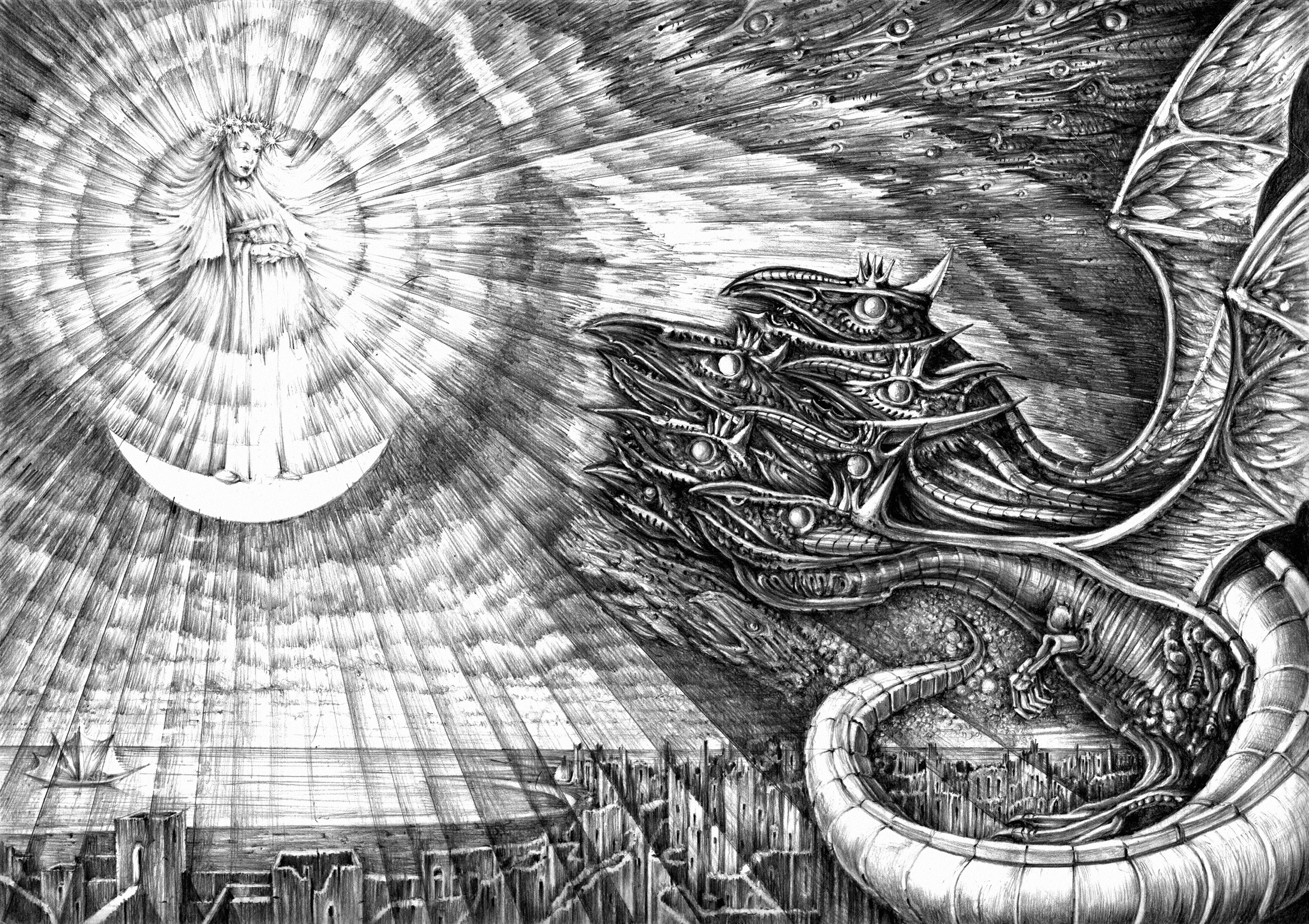
Apocalypse 09, drawing, 70x50cm, 2007.

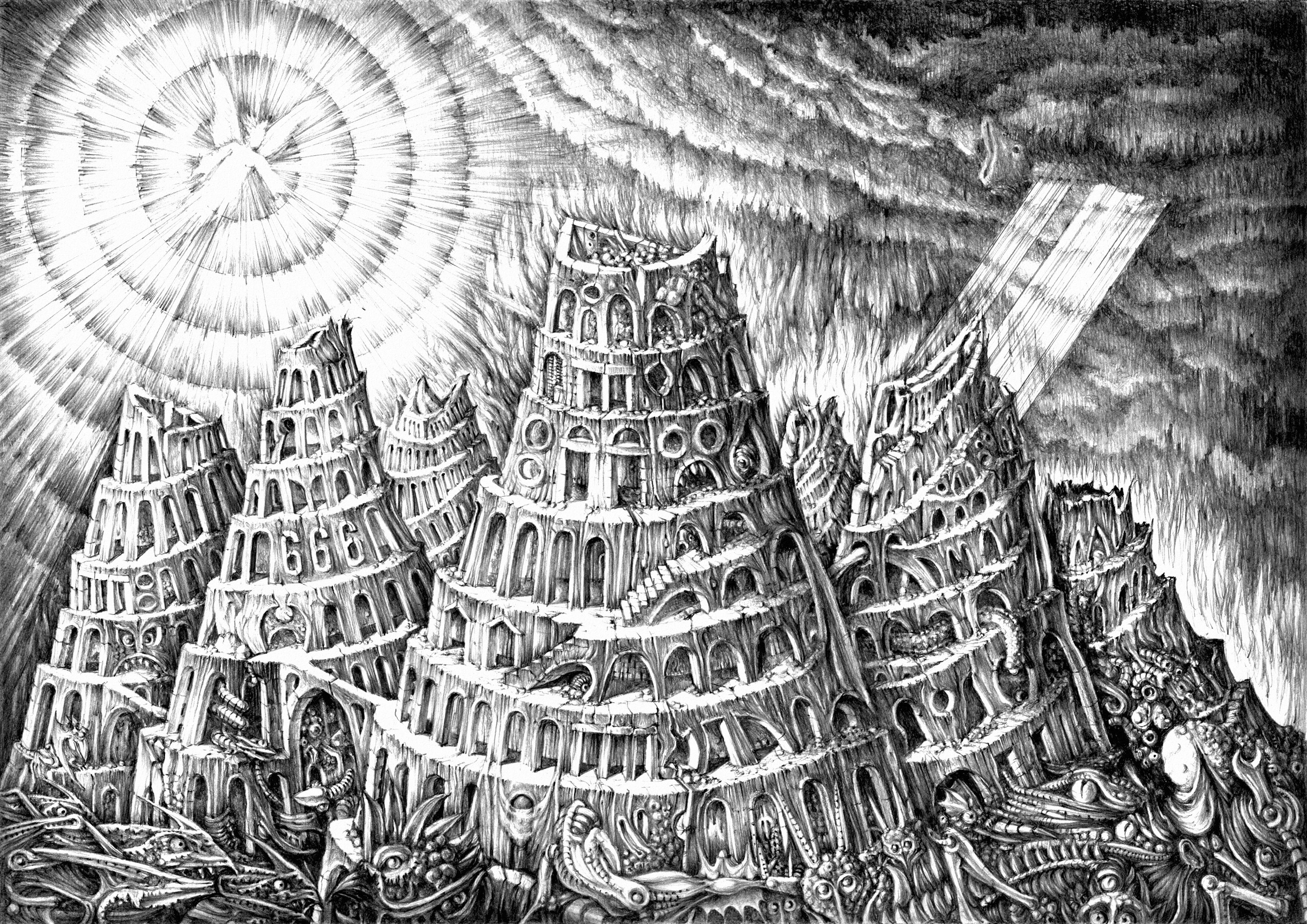
Apocalypse 10, drawing, 70x50cm, 2007.
