= Čanak =

Čanak is a surname. Notable people with the surname include:

- Mihailo Čanak (1932–2014), Serbian architect and researcher
- Nenad Čanak (born 1959), Serbian politician
- Nenad Čanak (basketball) (born 1976), Serbian basketball player

== See also ==
- Çanak
