= Deaths in December 2015 =

The following is a list of notable deaths in December 2015.

Entries for each day are listed alphabetically by surname. A typical entry lists information in the following sequence:

- Name, age, country of citizenship and reason for notability, established cause of death, reference.

== December 2015 ==
=== 1 ===
- Edwar al-Kharrat, 89, Egyptian novelist, pneumonia.
- Rob Blokzijl, 72, Dutch physicist and computer scientist.
- Marc Breslow, 90, American game show director (The Price is Right, Match Game, Family Feud).
- Joseph Engelberger, 90, American engineer and inventor.
- Leoni Franco, 73, Uruguayan musician, composer and guitarist.
- Robert E. Glennen, 82, American academic, President of Emporia State University (1985–1997).
- Shirley Gunter, 81, American R&B singer.
- William W. Joscelyn, 89, American politician.
- John F. Kurtzke, 89, American neurologist.
- Jim Loscutoff, 85, American basketball player (Boston Celtics), NBA champion (1957, 1959–1964), complications of pneumonia and Parkinson's disease.
- Maurice Martel, 79, Canadian politician.
- Trevor Obst, 75, Australian football player (Port Adelaide).
- Xavier Olea Muñoz, 92, Mexican lawyer and politician, Governor of Guerrero (1975).
- Marjorie Oludhe Macgoye, 87, English-born Kenyan writer.
- Randy Owens, 56, American basketball player.
- V. Ramachandran, 84, Indian civil servant.
- Antonio Troyo Calderón, 92, Costa Rican Roman Catholic prelate, Auxiliary Bishop of San José de Costa Rica (1979–2002).

=== 2 ===
- Jon Arfstrom, 87, American artist.
- Sandy Berger, 70, American political consultant, United States National Security Advisor (1997–2001), cancer.
- Theodor Borchgrevink, 92, Norwegian civil engineer.
- Bryony Brind, 55, English ballerina, heart attack.
- John Eaton, 81, American composer, brain hemorrhage.
- Gabriele Ferzetti, 90, Italian actor (L'Avventura, On Her Majesty's Secret Service, Once Upon a Time in the West).
- Ray Gandolf, 85, American sportscaster.
- Phila Hach, 89, American chef.
- Shelby Highsmith, 86, American federal judge, adrenal cancer.
- Sam Ibiam, 90, Nigerian footballer (national team).
- Portia James, 62, American curator and historian.
- Ferenc Juhász, 87, Hungarian poet.
- Wim Kolijn, 71, Dutch politician.
- Ernst Larsen, 89, Norwegian runner, Olympic bronze medalist (1956).
- Bob Martyn, 85, American baseball player (Kansas City Athletics).
- Will McMillan, 71, American actor (General Hospital, The Crazies), producer, and director.
- Joan L. Mitchell, 68, American computer scientist, co-inventor of JPEG.
- Sir John Osborn, 92, British politician, Member of Parliament for Sheffield Hallam (1959–1987).
- M. A. M. Ramaswamy, 84, Indian industrialist and politician.
- John Rassias, 90, American language professor.
- Wally Roker, 78, American R&B singer and music executive, complications following brain surgery.
- George T. Sakato, 94, American soldier, Medal of Honor recipient.
- A. Sheriff, 74, Indian screenwriter (Avalude Ravukal).
- Thom Thomas, 80, American playwright, leukemia.
- Anthony Valentine, 76, British actor (Colditz, Coronation Street, Escape to Athena), Parkinson's disease.
- Luz Marina Zuluaga, 77, Colombian beauty queen, Miss Universe (1958).
- Perpetrators of the 2015 San Bernardino attack shot dead by police:
  - Syed Rizwan Farook, 28, American.
  - Tashfeen Malik, 29, Pakistani.

=== 3 ===
- Omar Ali, 76, Bangladeshi poet.
- Gladstone Anderson, 81, Jamaican musician.
- Willie Burden, 64, Canadian football player (Calgary Stampeders) and sports administrator.
- Roy Evans, 84, Welsh trade union leader.
- Sunil Hettiarachchi, 78, Sri Lankan actor.
- Eevi Huttunen, 93, Finnish speed skater, world champion (1951, 1953, 1954, 1957, 1959), Olympic bronze medalist (1960).
- Bill Kiskaddon, 85, American politician.
- Lawrence Pugh, 82, American businessman, chief executive of VF Corporation.
- Shared Belief, 4, American racehorse, colic.
- Arthur R. Taylor, 80, American businessman, president of CBS.
- Scott Weiland, 48, American musician (Stone Temple Pilots, Velvet Revolver, The Wondergirls), accidental drug and alcohol overdose.
- Howard West, 84, American television producer (Seinfeld).
- Melvin Williams, 73, American drug trafficker and actor (The Wire), cancer.
- Michael Wilson, 75, New Zealand cricketer.

=== 4 ===
- Jaime Camino, 79, Spanish film director (The Long Winter, Lights and Shadows).
- Erik De Vlaeminck, 70, Belgian cyclist, seven-time world-champion cyclo-cross (1966, 1968–1973).
- Norman Engleback, 88, British architect.
- Sarah Nash Gates, 66, American costume designer, cancer.
- John Glad, 73, American academic and translator.
- Ricardo Guízar Díaz, 82, Mexican Roman Catholic prelate, Archbishop of Tlalnepantla (1996–2009).
- Henry Hall, 87, British physicist.
- Robert Loggia, 85, American actor (Jagged Edge, Scarface, Big), complications from Alzheimer's disease.
- Rodney Milnes, 79, British opera critic.
- Karen Montgomery, 66, American actress and film producer, breast cancer.
- Irakli Ochiauri, 91, Georgian sculptor.
- Takamasa Sakurai, 49, Japanese author and popular culture expert, proponent of anime for cultural exchange, hit by train.
- Yossi Sarid, 75, Israeli politician, member of Knesset (1974–2006), Minister of Environment (1992–1996) and Education (1999–2000).
- Dmitry Shumkov, 43, Russian lawyer and investor, asphyxiation.
- Dag Skogheim, 87, Norwegian writer.
- Akiko Sugimoto, 62, Japanese novelist, breast cancer.
- Walter C. Sweet, 88, American paleontologist, complications from a heart attack.
- Lajos Takács, 91, Hungarian mathematician.
- Xu Ming, 44, Chinese entrepreneur and billionaire.

=== 5 ===
- Zafar Altaf, 74, Pakistani cricketer, administrator and civil servant, heart attack.
- Willie Coburn, 74, Scottish footballer (St Johnstone).
- Peter Cochrane, 96, Scottish World War II army officer.
- Luigi Conti, 86, Italian-born Vatican diplomat, Apostolic nuncio (1975–2003).
- Ray Crooke, 93, Australian artist, winner of the Archibald Prize (1969).
- Bruce Day, 87, Australian structural engineer.
- Kiki Divaris, 90, Greek fashion designer, complications from pneumonia.
- Vic Eliason, 79, American Christian broadcaster, cancer.
- Marty Feldman, 93, American football coach (Oakland Raiders).
- Markku Häkkinen, 69, Finnish botanist.
- Yolande Henderson, 81, Pakistani teacher, intestinal cancer.
- William McIlvanney, 79, Scottish novelist and poet.
- Hack Meyers, 41, American professional wrestler (ECW), complications from brain surgery.
- Marília Pêra, 72, Brazilian actress (Pixote, Better Days Ahead), lung cancer.
- Dimitar Iliev Popov, 88, Bulgarian politician, Prime Minister (1990–1991).
- Tibor Rubin, 86, Hungarian-born American Medal of Honor recipient and Holocaust survivor.
- Wolfgang Sandner, 66, German physicist.
- Siddhi Savetsila, 96, Thai politician, Minister of Foreign Affairs (1980–1990), Deputy Prime Minister (1986).
- Dave Scholz, 67, American basketball player (Philadelphia 76ers).
- Horst Schuldes, 76, German Olympic ice hockey player (1960), (1964).
- Franz Speta, 74, Austrian botanist.
- Byron Vlahakis, 83, American mobster.
- Chuck Williams, 100, American business executive and author, founder of Williams Sonoma.
- Bruce Yorke, 91, Canadian politician.

=== 6 ===
- Dale Anderson, 83, Canadian ice hockey player (Detroit Red Wings).
- Ken Beatrice, 72, American radio personality (WMAL, WTEM), complications from pneumonia.
- Ian Burns, 76, Scottish footballer (Aberdeen).
- Max Hauri, 73, Swiss Olympic equestrian.
- Mack Herron, 67, American football player (Winnipeg Blue Bombers, New England Patriots).
- Ko Chun-hsiung, 70, Taiwanese actor (Eight Hundred Heroes, Attack Force Z), director and politician, member of the Legislative Yuan (2005–2008), lung cancer.
- Franzl Lang, 84, German yodeler.
- Liu Juying, 98, Chinese politician and army general.
- Mariuccia Mandelli, 90, Italian fashion designer, founder of Krizia.
- Mike Mangold, 60, American commercial and aerobatics pilot, world champion (2005, 2007), plane crash.
- Mick McLaughlin, 72, Welsh footballer (Hereford United, Newport County).
- John L. Myers, 68, American politician.
- Jaafar Mohammed Saad, Yemeni politician and general, Governor of Aden (since 2015), car bombing.
- Georg Smefjell, 78, Norwegian Olympic ice hockey player (1964), (1968).
- Nicholas Smith, 81, British actor (Are You Being Served?, Wallace & Gromit: The Curse of the Were-Rabbit, Doctor Who), complications from a fall.
- Zoltán Szabó, 86, Hungarian cardiac surgeon, performed nation's first successful heart transplant.
- Tomi Taira, 87, Japanese actress, respiratory failure.
- Holly Woodlawn, 69, Puerto Rican-born American actress and Warhol superstar, brain and liver cancer.
- Wu Te-mei, 68, Taiwanese politician, MLY (1984–1996), kidney failure caused by diabetes.

=== 7 ===
- Betty Bourke, 91, New Zealand health administrator.
- Martin E. Brooks, 90, American actor (The Six Million Dollar Man, The Bionic Woman, Dallas).
- Lolita Aniyar de Castro, 78, Venezuelan politician.
- Horn Chen, 83, American businessman.
- Jesse C. Deen, 93, American politician.
- Heinz Fricke, 88, German conductor and music director.
- Hoàng Hà Giang, 24, Vietnamese Taekwondo athlete, silver medalist at the 2006 Asian Games.
- Sydney Greve, 90, Pakistani Olympic boxer.
- Gerhard Lenski, 91, American sociologist.
- Abbondio Marcelli, 83, Italian Olympic rower.
- Rrok Mirdita, 76, Montenegrin-born Albanian Roman Catholic prelate, Archbishop of Tiranë-Durrës (since 1992).
- Virginia A. Myers, 88, American artist, professor and printmaker.
- Kenneth Partridge, 89, English interior decorator.
- Elaine Riley, 98, American actress.
- Hyron Spinrad, 81, American astronomer.
- Shirley Stelfox, 74, British actress (Emmerdale, Keeping Up Appearances, Coronation Street), cancer.
- Jennifer Taylor, 80, Australian architect and academic.
- Peter Westbury, 77, British racing driver.
- Donald A. Young, 86, Canadian scientist.

=== 8 ===
- Mattiwilda Dobbs, 90, American coloratura soprano, cancer.
- Gus Gil, 76, Venezuelan baseball player (Cleveland Indians, Milwaukee Brewers, Seattle Pilots).
- Alan Hodgkinson, 79, English footballer (Sheffield United, national team).
- Derek Hyatt, 84, English landscape painter.
- Bonnie Lou, 91, American country singer, dementia.
- Gary Marker, 72, American bassist (Rising Sons, Captain Beefheart and his Magic Band) and recording engineer, stroke.
- Johnny More, 81, English impressionist, leukaemia.
- J. Hugh Nichols, 85, American politician.
- Angelo Sangiacomo, 91, American real estate developer.
- Chuck Sannipoli, 70, American computer scientist, complications from brain cancer and Parkinson's disease.
- Anthony Francis Sharma, 77, Nepalese Roman Catholic prelate, Vicar Apostolic of Nepal (1984–2014).
- Jokelyn Tienstra, 45, Dutch handball player, brain tumor.
- Douglas Tompkins, 72, American conservationist and businessman, co-founder of The North Face and Esprit, hypothermia following kayak accident.
- John Trudell, 69, American Indian activist and poet, cancer.
- Elsie Tu, 102, English-born Hong Kong social activist, member of the Legislative Council of Hong Kong (1988–1995).
- Ramashankar Yadav, 58, Indian poet and activist.

=== 9 ===
- Soshana Afroyim, 88, Austrian painter.
- Norman Breslow, 74, American statistician and medical researcher, prostate cancer.
- Bob Clark, 93, American television journalist (ABC News).
- John Cockerton, 88, British Anglican priest and academic.
- Carlo Furno, 94, Italian Roman Catholic prelate, Cardinal (since 1994) and Apostolic nuncio (1973–1995).
- C. Gerald Fraser, 90, American journalist (The New York Times, New York Amsterdam News).
- Robert Grant, 67, American politician, member of the Kansas House of Representatives (1991–1994, 1997–2013).
- Gheorghe Gruia, 75, Romanian handball player, world champion (1964, 1970), Olympic bronze medalist (1972).
- LaBreeska Hemphill, 75, American singer.
- Rusty Jones, 73, American jazz drummer.
- Juvenal Juvêncio, 81, Brazilian lawyer and sports director.
- Isao Kataoka, 79, Japanese ice hockey administrator.
- Albert Merlin, 84, French economist.
- Akiyuki Nosaka, 85, Japanese novelist (Grave of the Fireflies).
- Igino Rizzi, 91, Italian Olympic ski jumper.
- Henry Rowan, 92, American philanthropist and engineer.
- Matthew Shija, 91, Tanzanian Roman Catholic prelate, Bishop of Kahama (1983–2001).
- Julio Terrazas Sandoval, 79, Bolivian Roman Catholic prelate, Cardinal (since 2001) and Archbishop of Santa Cruz de la Sierra (1991–2013).
- Jenny Wormald, 73, Scottish historian.

=== 10 ===
- Klaus Baumgartner, 77, Swiss politician.
- Ian Bell, 59, Scottish journalist and author.
- Rainer Bloss, 69, German electronic musician (Drive Inn).
- Ron Bouchard, 67, American NASCAR driver, cancer.
- Walter Fawcett, 86, Northern Irish cricketer.
- Maurice Graham, 83, Australian rugby union player (New South Wales, New Zealand).
- Denis Héroux, 75, Canadian film director and producer.
- Dermot O'Mahony, 80, Irish Roman Catholic prelate, Auxiliary Bishop of Dublin (1975–1996).
- Arnold Peralta, 26, Honduran footballer (national team, Rangers F.C.), shot.
- Desmond Robinson, 87, British Olympic cyclist.
- Dolph Schayes, 87, American Hall of Fame basketball player and coach (Philadelphia 76ers), NBA champion (1955), cancer.
- Barry Schweid, 83, American news correspondent (Associated Press), neurological disease.
- Donald J. Stohr, 81, American federal judge, U.S. District Court Judge for the Eastern District of Missouri (1992–2006).
- Maury Terry, 69, American journalist.

=== 11 ===
- Mihai Adam, 75, Romanian footballer.
- Harry Butler, 85, Australian naturalist and conservationist, cancer.
- Samir Chakrabarti, 72, Indian cricketer.
- Steve Chimombo, 70, Malawian writer.
- Lloyd Dane, 90, American racing driver.
- Neville De Souza, 87, Jamaican religious figure, Bishop of Jamaica and the Cayman Islands (1979–2000).
- John Harrison, 88, English footballer (Colchester United, Aston Villa).
- Jake Howard, 70, Australian rugby union player (national team).
- Igor Kashintsev, 83, Soviet and Russian actor.
- Abish Kekilbayev, 76, Kazakh politician and academic.
- József Kertész, 75, Hungarian Olympic ice hockey player.
- Sir Roderick McSween, 80, Scottish pathologist.
- Altaff Mungrue, 81, Trinidadian-born English cricketer.
- Jiří Paďour, 72, Czech Roman Catholic prelate, Bishop of České Budějovice (2002–2014).
- Gaston Salvatore, 74, Chilean writer.
- Alfred C. Snider, 65, American academic.
- H. Arnold Steinberg, 82, Canadian business and educational administrator, Chancellor of McGill University (2009–2014).
- Hema Upadhyay, 43, Indian artist, bludgeoned.
- John "Hot Rod" Williams, 53, American basketball player (Cleveland Cavaliers, Phoenix Suns), prostate cancer.
- Zyx, 65, Canadian cartoonist and publisher (Croc).

=== 12 ===
- Luis Bermejo, 84, Spanish cartoonist and illustrator.
- Terry Bledsoe, 81, American football executive and sportswriter.
- Ignacio Carrau, 92, Spanish politician and lawyer.
- Jon Gadsby, 62, British-born New Zealand writer and comedian (A Week of It), cancer.
- Gösta Gärdin, 92, Swedish modern pentathlete, Olympic bronze medalist (1948).
- Frans Geurtsen, 73, Dutch footballer (DWS, national team).
- Sir Peter Gregson, 79, British civil servant.
- Ken Johnson, 87, British Olympic steeplechase athlete (1952).
- Sharad Anantrao Joshi, 80, Indian politician and social activist, prostate cancer.
- Federico Kirbus, 84, Argentine author.
- Evelyn S. Lieberman, 71, American public affairs professional, White House Deputy Chief of Staff (1996), pancreatic cancer.
- I. Howard Marshall, 81, Scottish theologian, pancreatic cancer.
- Yuri Marushkin, 71, Russian football player and manager.
- Gene Ready, 74, American politician, member of the Florida House of Representatives (1977–1984), cancer.
- John Scott-Scott, 81, British aerospace engineer.
- Rose Siggins, 43, American actress (American Horror Story), infection.
- Yashpal Singh, 94, Indian politician
- Gregory Baker Wolfe, 93, American diplomat and academic.

=== 13 ===
- Benedict Anderson, 79, American academic and writer (Imagined Communities), heart failure.
- John Bannon, 72, Australian politician, Premier of South Australia (1982–1992), cancer.
- Albert Bontridder, 94, Belgian architect and writer.
- Luigi Creatore, 93, American songwriter and record producer, pneumonia.
- James Gillies, 91, Canadian politician.
- Don Leaver, 86, English television director (The Avengers, A Fine Romance, A Touch of Frost).
- Marleen de Pater-van der Meer, 65, Dutch politician, member of the House of Representatives (2001–2010).
- Phil Pepe, 80, American sportswriter, heart attack.
- Gretchen Quie, 88, American artist, First Lady of Minnesota (1979–1983), restored the Minnesota Governor's Residence, Parkinson's disease.
- Peter Ryan, 92, Australian newspaper columnist.
- Ed Sharkey, 88, American football player (Philadelphia Eagles, San Francisco 49ers, BC Lions).
- Donald Weinstein, 89, American historian.

=== 14 ===
- Sultan Mohammed Ali al-Kitbi, 45, Emirati colonel, rocket strike.
- Terry Backer, 61, American politician, member of the Connecticut House of Representatives (since 1993), brain cancer.
- Sian Blake, 43, British actress (EastEnders), stabbed.
- Armando Cossutta, 89, Italian politician, member of the European Parliament (1999–2004).
- Johnny Egan, 76, Irish Gaelic football player (Offaly).
- Kathryn H. Kidd, 65, American author.
- Herbert Kiesel, 84, Swiss bobsledder.
- Robert Kobayashi, 90, American painter.
- Joe Lancaster, 89, English football player and trainer.
- Edmund Lyndeck, 90, American singer and actor (Big Daddy, Enchanted, Road Trip).
- Scat Daddy, 11, American Thoroughbred racehorse.
- Leander J. Shaw Jr., 85, American politician, Chief Justice of Florida Supreme Court (1990–1992).
- Glen Sonmor, 86, Canadian ice hockey player (New York Rangers) and head coach (Minnesota North Stars), pneumonia.
- Mick Twomey, 84, Australian football player (Collingwood).
- Vadym Tyshchenko, 52, Ukrainian football player (Karpaty, Dnipro) and manager (Dnipro), Olympic champion (1988).
- Lillian Vernon, 88, German-born American businesswoman, founder of Lillian Vernon.
- Aleš Veselý, 80, Czech sculptor.

=== 15 ===
- Tom Arden, 54, Australian-born British author, cancer.
- Milton Ballantyne, 87, Australian politician, member of the Northern Territory Legislative Assembly (1974–1980).
- André Bernard, 85, French cyclist.
- Stella Doufexis, 47, German mezzo-soprano, cancer.
- Licio Gelli, 96, Italian financier, Venerable Master of the Propaganda Due lodge.
- Charles C. Lanham, 87, American politician, member of West Virginia Senate.
- Miles Myers, 84, American writer.
- Robert Nemeth, 57, Austrian Olympic runner.
- Ken Pogue, 81, Canadian actor (The 6th Day, The Dead Zone, Millennium), cancer.
- Kathy Secker, 70, British television presenter.
- Harry Zvi Tabor, 98, British-born Israeli physicist.
- David Thwaites, 94, American fighter pilot.
- H. Paul Varley, 84, American historian.

=== 16 ===
- Noboru Ando, 89, Japanese actor and yakuza.
- Svein Bakke, 62, Norwegian footballer (Sogndal).
- Lita Baron, 92, Spanish-born American actress and singer, complications from a fall.
- John Bates, 77, American college basketball coach (Maryland Eastern Shore, Coppin State), heart attack.
- Patricia Brooker, 80, English television personality (The Only Way Is Essex) and author.
- Peter Dickinson, 88, British author (Tulku, The Flight of Dragons, City of Gold).
- Khodadad Mirza Farman Farmaian, 87, Iranian Qajar dynasty royal and banker.
- Gabre Gabric, 101, Croatian-born Italian Olympic track and field athlete (1936), (1948).
- Snuff Garrett, 76, American record producer, cancer.
- Aafje Heynis, 91, Dutch contralto.
- Raymond Hughes, 78, Welsh costume designer (Return to Oz, The Musketeer, The Pallisers).
- Brian Keeble, 77, English footballer (Grimsby Town, Darlington).
- Walter Keller, 82, Swiss Olympic ice hockey player.
- Bob Krause, 70, American college athletic director (Kansas State University), cancer.
- Heinz-Otto Kreiss, 85, German-born Swedish mathematician.
- Lizmark, 64, Mexican professional wrestler, respiratory failure.
- Jim McAnany, 79, American baseball player (Chicago White Sox, Chicago Cubs).
- Anthony Muto, 81, American fashion designer, heart failure.
- Zoulikha Nasri, 70, Moroccan politician, Secretary of State for National Cooperation (1997–1998).
- George Earl Ortman, 89, American artist.
- Ray Price, 78, American motorcycle builder and racer.
- René Saorgin, 87, French organist.
- Ilie Savel, 88, Romanian Olympic hurdler.
- Harry Scott, 78, British boxer.
- Joseph Tellechéa, 89, French footballer.
- Enoch Thorsgard, 98, American politician.
- John C. Towler, 76, American politician.

=== 17 ===
- Hal Brown, 91, American baseball player (Boston Red Sox, Baltimore Orioles, Houston Colt .45s).
- Serge Devèze, 59, French football manager.
- Zaevion Dobson, 15, American football player, shot.
- Börje Grönroos, 86, Finnish Olympic boxer.
- Osamu Hayaishi, 95, Japanese biochemist.
- Buckshot Hoffner, 91, American politician.
- Vladimir Kostyukov, 61, Belarusian football coach and player (Dnepr Mogilev).
- Ira N. Levine, 78, American chemist.
- Mick Lynch, 56, Irish musician (Stump), cancer.
- Emellia Prokopik, 95, American nun.
- Kamal Ahmed Rizvi, 85, Pakistani actor and writer, heart attack.
- Joseph Roduit, 76, Swiss Roman Catholic prelate, Abbot of Saint-Maurice d'Agaune (1999–2015).
- Michael Wyschogrod, 87, German-born American Jewish theologian.

=== 18 ===
- Luc Brewaeys, 56, Belgian composer and musician, cancer.
- Florentino Broce, 72, Filipino football player and coach.
- Slobodan Čašule, 70, Macedonian politician, Minister of Foreign Affairs (2001–2002).
- Yūzan Fujita, 66, Japanese politician, Governor of Hiroshima Prefecture (1993–2009).
- Carl Furlonge, 83, Trinidadian cricketer.
- Joe Gilmore, 93, British barman.
- Evelio Hernández, 84, Cuban baseball player (Washington Senators).
- Vittore Gottardi, 74, Swiss footballer.
- Stu Hodgson, 91, Canadian politician, Commissioner of the Northwest Territories (1967–1979).
- Martin Jære, 95, Norwegian Olympic skier (1948).
- Robert C. Londerholm, 84, American politician.
- Daifallah Masadeh, 76–77, Jordanian politician, State Minister for Legal Affairs (2000–2001).
- Alison McCusker, 82, Australian botanist.
- Léon Mébiame, 81, Gabonese politician, Prime Minister (1975–1990).
- Howell W. Melton, 92, American lawyer and judge.
- Placidus Nkalanga, 96, Tanzanian Roman Catholic prelate, Bishop of Bukoba (1969–1973).
- Phil Oestricher, 84, American test pilot.
- Andreja Preger, 104, Hungarian-born Serbian pianist and Holocaust survivor.
- Mogens Rukov, 72, Danish screenwriter.
- Jesús Samper, 65, Spanish businessman, owner of Real Murcia (since 2001).
- Fred Sheedy, 75, Irish hurler and Gaelic footballer.
- Helge Solum Larsen, 46, Norwegian politician, deputy leader of Venstre (2010–2012), aneurysm.
- Umberto Trippa, 84, Italian Olympic boxer.
- Jean-Luc Vilmouth, 63, French artist.

=== 19 ===
- Bets Borm-Luijkx, 97, Dutch politician, member of the House of Representatives (1980–1981).
- Peter Broggs, 61, Jamaican reggae musician.
- Douglas Dick, 95, American actor (Rope, Perry Mason).
- Louis DiGiaimo, 77, American casting director (The Godfather, Homicide: Life on the Street) and film producer (Donnie Brasco), stroke.
- Maurice Grace, 86, Australian Olympic rower.
- Chris Harris, 67, American politician, member of the Texas House of Representatives (1985–1991) and Senate (1991–2013).
- Jimmy Hill, 87, English footballer (Fulham) and manager (Coventry City), trade union leader (PFA) and TV presenter (Match of the Day), Alzheimer's disease.
- Harry Hyams, 87, British property developer (Centre Point).
- Greville Janner, 87, British politician, MP for Leicester North West (1970–1974) and Leicester West (1974–1997), Alzheimer's disease.
- Stephen Jelicich, 92, Croatian-born New Zealand architect.
- Mabuni Kenei, 97, Japanese martial arts expert.
- Samir Kuntar, 53, Lebanese convicted murderer, member of Hezbollah, longest-held Lebanese prisoner in Israel, missile strike.
- Alan Lee, 61, British cricket and horse racing journalist.
- Madame Claude, 92, French procurer.
- Kurt Masur, 88, German conductor, Parkinson's disease.
- Benjamin F. Montoya, 80, American rear admiral.
- Dickie Moore, 84, Canadian Hall of Fame ice hockey player (Montreal Canadiens), Stanley Cup winner (1953, 1956–1960), prostate cancer.
- Carlos Païta, 83, Argentine conductor.
- Ranganath, 66, Indian Telugu actor, suicide by hanging.
- Selma Reis, 55, Brazilian actress and singer, brain cancer.
- Edgar Rosenberg, 90, American scholar.
- Ozell Sutton, 90, American civil rights activist.
- Karin Söder, 87, Swedish politician, leader of the Centre Party (1985–1987), Minister for Health and Social Affairs (1979–1982), Minister for Foreign Affairs (1976–1978).
- Dick Wathika, 42, Kenyan politician, Mayor of Nairobi (2004–2008).

=== 20 ===
- Aldo Baito, 95, Italian cyclist.
- George Burpo, 93, American baseball player (Cincinnati Reds).
- Rudi Ceyssens, 53, Belgian Olympic cyclist.
- Ronald Crawford, 76, American Olympic water polo player.
- Patricia Elliott, 77, American actress (A Little Night Music, One Life to Live), Tony Award winner (1973), leiomyosarcoma.
- Gevorg Geodakyan, 87, Armenian musicologist.
- Robert Hayling, 86, American civil rights activist.
- Alain Jouffroy, 87, French surrealist poet and art critic.
- Ray Mathews, 86, American football player (Pittsburgh Steelers).
- Angela McEwan, 81, American actress (Nebraska, Getting On), lung cancer.
- Wayne Robinson, 85, American football player (Philadelphia Eagles).
- Kjell Bloch Sandved, 93, Norwegian-born American author and nature photographer.
- Jim West, 61, Australian boxer, national flyweight/super featherweight and Commonwealth flyweight champion.

=== 21 ===
- J. Richard Batchelor, 84, British immunologist.
- Rimma Bilunova, 75, Russian chess player and coach.
- Dejan Brđović, 49, Serbian volleyball player, Olympic bronze medalist (1996).
- Abune Dioskoros, 80, Eritrean prelate, Patriarch of the Eritrean Orthodox Tewahedo Church (since 2007).
- Sam Dockery, 86, American jazz pianist.
- David Emms, 90, British educationalist.
- Timothy Foote, 89, American editor and writer.
- Jan Góra, 67, Polish Roman Catholic Dominican priest.
- Jupiter Apple, 47, Brazilian singer-songwriter and multi-instrumentalist (TNT, Os Cascavelletes), multiple organ failure.
- Vilgot Larsson, 83, Swedish Olympic ice hockey player (1956), (Leksands IF), world champion (1957).
- Richelieu Levoyer, 85, Ecuadorian army general and politician.
- Lim Eng Beng, 64, Filipino basketball player, liver cancer.
- Bob Suci, 76, American football player (Houston Oilers, Boston Patriots).
- Andrei Troschinsky, 37, Kazakhstani ice hockey player, Asian champion (1999), heart attack.
- Ernesto Mayz Vallenilla, 90, Venezuelan philosopher.
- Emmanuel Yarbrough, 55, American mixed martial artist.

=== 22 ===
- Arlin Adams, 94, American judge.
- Sally Arnup, 85, English sculptor, complications from sepsis.
- Rolf Bossi, 92, German lawyer.
- Carol Burns, 68, Australian actress (Prisoner), cancer.
- Daniel J. Dinan, 86, American judge.
- John Duffy, 89, American composer.
- Katherine Duffy, 71, American LGBTQ rights activist.
- Daisy Elliott, 98, American politician and realtor.
- Derek Ezra, Baron Ezra, 96, British coal industry administrator, Chairman of the National Coal Board (1971–1982).
- Nabil Al Fadl, 66, Kuwaiti politician.
- Billy Glaze, 72, American serial killer, lung cancer.
- Marijane Landis, 87, American broadcaster and television host (WGAL-TV).
- Joseph Leopold Imesch, 84, American Roman Catholic prelate, Bishop of Joliet (1979–2006).
- José Jhonson, 76, Ecuadorian footballer.
- Peter Lundblad, 65, Swedish singer ("Ta mig till havet"), prostate cancer.
- V. S. Malimath, 86, Indian judge, Chief Justice of Karnataka (1984) and Kerala (1985–1991).
- Riley Martin, 69, American author and radio host.
- Brooke McCarter, 52, American model and actor (The Lost Boys, Thrashin', Wired), alpha 1-antitrypsin deficiency.
- Freda Meissner-Blau, 88, Austrian politician, founder of The Greens – The Green Alternative.
- D. D. Raphael, 99, British philosopher.
- Kei Taniguchi, 43, Japanese mountaineer, fall.
- Carson Van Osten, 70, American artist, Disney Legend.

=== 23 ===
- Hocine Aït Ahmed, 89, Algerian politician, founder and leader of Socialist Forces Front.
- Carlos Cano, 60, Peruvian actor, cancer.
- Chen Luyun, 38, Chinese basketball player, colon cancer.
- Henry Crichton, 6th Earl Erne, 78, British peer.
- Michael Earl, 56, American puppeteer (Sesame Street, Dinosaurs, Team America: World Police), colon cancer.
- Alfred G. Gilman, 74, American pharmacologist and biochemist, Nobel Prize laureate, pancreatic cancer.
- Grégoire Haddad, 91, Lebanese Melkite Greek Catholic hierarch, Archbishop of Beirut and Byblos (1968–1975).
- Hatidža Hadžiosmanović, 78, Bosnian jurist, President of the Constitutional Court of Bosnia and Herzegovina.
- Don Howe, 80, English footballer (West Bromwich Albion, Arsenal, national team) and coach.
- Ablie Jagne, 62, Gambian footballer (Real de Banjul, national team).
- Joe Jamail, 90, American attorney and billionaire.
- Hamilton de Oliveira, 81, Brazilian Olympic volleyball player.
- Jean-Marie Pelt, 82, French biologist.
- Igor Persiantsev, 78, Russian figure skater.
- Sławomir Pstrong, 39, Polish film and television director, screenwriter, and author of short stories.
- Taklung Tsetrul Rinpoche, 89, Tibetan lama, Supreme Head of the Nyingma School of Tibetan Buddhism (since 2012).
- Susanne Hoeber Rudolph, 85, German-born American political scientist.
- Bill Subritzky, 90, New Zealand property developer and evangelist.
- Sir Brian Tovey, 89, British civil servant, Director of the Government Communications Headquarters (1978–1983).
- Bülent Ulusu, 92, Turkish politician, Prime Minister (1980–1983).

=== 24 ===
- Romeo Anaya, 69, Mexican boxer, WBA Bantamweight Champion (1973).
- László Bánhegyi, 84, Hungarian Olympic basketball player.
- Turid Birkeland, 53, Norwegian politician, Minister of Culture (1996–1997), myelofibrosis.
- Jim Carlton, 80, Australian politician, member of the Australian Parliament (1977–1994), Minister for Health (1982–1983).
- Suprovat Chakravarty, 86, Indian Olympic cyclist (1952), heart attack.
- Roy F. Chandler, 90, American author.
- David Clark, 89, American politician.
- Michael W. Davidson, 65, American microscopist.
- Eugène Dodeigne, 92, Belgian-born French sculptor.
- Samuel Felton, 89, American Olympic hammer thrower.
- Robert S. Folkenberg, 75, Puerto Rican Seventh-day Adventist leader, President of the General Conference (1990–1999).
- Dennis Griffiths, 82, British newspaper executive (Evening Standard) and press historian.
- William Guest, 74, American R&B singer (Gladys Knight & the Pips), heart failure.
- Melvin Holmes, 65, American football player (Pittsburgh Steelers).
- Ron Jacobs, 72, American basketball coach (Loyola Marymount University, Northern Cement, Philippine national team), complications from a stroke.
- Jin Xiang, 80, Chinese composer and music critic.
- Takeharu Kunimoto, 55, Japanese musician, acute respiratory failure.
- Letty Jimenez Magsanoc, 74, Filipino journalist (Philippine Daily Inquirer), cardiac arrest.
- Robert L. Mallat Jr., 84, American politician.
- Adriana Olguín, 104, Chilean lawyer and politician, Minister of Justice (1952).
- Carlo Vittori, 84, Italian Olympic sprinter.

=== 25 ===
- Manuel Agujetas, 76, Spanish flamenco singer.
- Zahran Alloush, 44, Syrian rebel commander, founder of Jaysh al-Islam, airstrike.
- Sir Clifford Boulton, 85, British public servant, Clerk of the House of Commons (1987–1994)
- Ali Eid, 75, Lebanese politician, General Secretary of the Arab Democratic Party (since 1972).
- George Evans, 74, Australian rugby league player (St. George).
- Karen Friesicke, 53, German comedian and actress, suicide.
- Abbott Gleason, 77, American historian, complications from Parkinson's disease.
- Leonid Gofshtein, 62, Israeli chess grandmaster.
- Ottavio Jemma, 90, Italian screenwriter.
- George Clayton Johnson, 86, American writer (Logan's Run, Ocean's 11, The Twilight Zone), prostate and bladder cancer.
- Norman Levi, 88, English-born Canadian politician.
- Charles Pangle, 74, American politician.
- Eric Philpott, 69, Irish Gaelic footballer (Cork).
- Ignacio Rupérez, 72, Spanish author and diplomat, Ambassador to Iraq (2005–2008) and Honduras (2009–2010).
- Acharya S, 54, American religious author, breast cancer.
- Sadhana Shivdasani, 74, Indian film actress (Love in Simla, Woh Kaun Thi, Hum Dono).
- Duarte Silva, 91, Portuguese Olympic alpine skier.
- Robert Spitzer, 83, American psychiatrist, heart disease.
- Jason Wingreen, 95, American actor (Archie Bunker's Place, The Empire Strikes Back, Airplane!).

=== 26 ===
- Nasser al-Bahri, 43, Saudi-born Yemeni Islamist militant and bodyguard.
- Tony Buffery, 76, British actor, comedian and writer.
- Andrea Cheng, 58, American author, breast cancer.
- Joe Dabney, 86, American author.
- Ogwyn Davies, 90, Welsh painter.
- Bobby Dews, 76, American baseball player and coach (Atlanta Braves).
- Ed Dobson, 65, British-born American theologian, amyotrophic lateral sclerosis.
- Ståle Eskeland, 72, Norwegian jurist, cancer.
- Robert Austin Larter, 90, Canadian politician.
- Emory Melton, 92, American politician, Missouri State Senator (1972–1996).
- William O'Callaghan, 94, Irish Army lieutenant general, Force Commander (United Nations Interim Force in Lebanon).
- Jim O'Toole, 78, American baseball player (Cincinnati Reds).
- Mac Otten, 90, American basketball player (St. Louis Bombers).
- Jamie Parsons, 74, American politician, Mayor of Juneau (1991–1994), cancer.
- Frank B. Salisbury, 89, American plant physiologist.
- Don Schain, 74, American film producer (High School Musical, Little Secrets, The Luck of the Irish).
- Mary Scranton, 97, American community advocate and philanthropist, First Lady of Pennsylvania (1963–1967), Alzheimer's disease.
- Marcel Seynaeve, 82, Belgian cyclist.
- Tongdaeng, 17, Thai dog, pet of King Bhumibol Adulyadej.
- William W. Turner, 88, American author and FBI agent.
- Sten Wickbom, 84, Swedish politician, Governor of Kronoberg County (1988–1995), Minister for Justice (1983–1987).

=== 27 ===
- Naji al Jerf, 37, Syrian journalist and filmmaker, shot.
- Christopher N. L. Brooke, 88, British medieval historian.
- David L. Brower, 83, American politician.
- Stein Eriksen, 88, Norwegian alpine skier, Olympic champion (1952) and triple world champion (1954).
- Franco Giacobini, 89, Italian actor.
- Dave Henderson, 57, American baseball player (Seattle Mariners, Boston Red Sox, Oakland Athletics), World Series champion (1989), heart attack.
- Aidan Higgins, 88, Irish writer.
- Ellsworth Kelly, 92, American artist.
- Meadowlark Lemon, 83, American Hall of Fame basketball player (Harlem Globetrotters).
- Sidney Mintz, 93, American anthropologist.
- Bill Mullins, 95, Irish horse rider.
- Alfredo Pacheco, 33, Salvadoran footballer (FAS, New York Red Bulls, national team), shot.
- Carlos Rosales Mendoza, 52, Mexican drug lord, founder of La Familia Michoacana.
- Heinz Schulz, 80, German Olympic boxer.
- Tom Shreiner, 73-74, American football player and coach.
- Andy M. Stewart, 63, Scottish folk singer (Silly Wizard).
- Roy Swinbourne, 86, English footballer (Wolverhampton Wanderers).
- Gabriel Tambon, 85, French politician, Mayor of Le Castellet, Var (since 1965).
- Brian Turner, 77, English cricketer.
- Wilbur Volz, 91, American football player (Buffalo Bills).
- Berenado Vunibobo, 83, Fijian politician and diplomat.
- Haskell Wexler, 93, American cinematographer and director (Who's Afraid of Virginia Woolf?, One Flew Over the Cuckoo's Nest, Medium Cool), Oscar winner (1966, 1976).
- Stevie Wright, 68, English-born Australian singer (The Easybeats).
- Youhannes Ezzat Zakaria Badir, 66, Egyptian Coptic Catholic hierarch, Bishop of Ismayliah (1992–1994) and Luqsor (since 1994).

=== 28 ===
- Ann Arnold, 79, English artist.
- Chris Barnard, 76, South African author, heart attack.
- Robert O. Blake, 94, American diplomat, Ambassador to Mali (1970–1973), prostate cancer.
- John Bradbury, 62, English drummer (The Specials).
- Dave Campbell, 90, Canadian Olympic basketball player.
- Nancy Randall Clark, 77, American politician.
- Rick Cluchey, 82, American playwright.
- Bram de Does, 81, Dutch typographer.
- Maggie Deahm, 77, Australian politician, member of the Australian House of Representatives for Macquarie (1993–1996).
- Guru Josh, 51, Jersey musician, suicide.
- John A. Holm, 72, American academic, prostate cancer.
- Joe Houston, 89, American jazz and R&B saxophonist.
- Eloy Inos, 66, Northern Mariana Islands politician, Governor (since 2013), Lieutenant Governor (2009–2013), complications after heart surgery.
- Eiji Kimizuka, 63, Japanese general, Chief of Staff Ground Self-Defense Force (2011–2013), lung cancer.
- Lemmy, 70, English rock musician (Motörhead, Hawkwind), complications from prostate cancer.
- Tiffany Leong, 30, Malaysian actress, liver cancer.
- Aura Lewis, 68, South African reggae singer.
- Ian Murdock, 42, American software engineer, founder of the Debian Project, suicide by hanging.
- Åge Nordkild, 63, Norwegian politician, member of the Sami Parliament (2001–2005, 2009–2013).
- Tone Nyhagen, 52, Norwegian dancer.
- Volney Peters, 87, American football player (Washington Redskins, Chicago Cardinals, Oakland Raiders).
- Landon H. Rowland, 78, American businessman (Kansas City Southern Railway).
- Pierre-Marie Rudelle, 83, French painter.
- Allen Sapp, 87, Canadian painter.
- Sylvester Stein, 95, South African writer and athlete.
- Sean Whitesell, 52, American actor and television producer (Cold Case, House, Oz), cancer.

=== 29 ===
- Sabino Acquaviva, 88, Italian sociologist.
- Billie Allen, 90, American actress, one of the first black performers on U.S. television.
- Aslam Azhar, 83, Pakistani television executive.
- Wanda Harper Bush, 84, American barrel racer, heart attack.
- Tony Carroll, 74, American psychotherapist.
- Patrick Curtin, 26, Irish Gaelic footballer (Kerry), head injuries after falling from a vehicle.
- John Ford, 84, Australian rules footballer (Fitzroy).
- Edward Hugh, 67, British economist, gallbladder and liver cancer.
- Anne Keefe, 90, American broadcaster.
- Kim Yang-gon, 73, North Korean senior politician, traffic collision.
- Elżbieta Krzesińska, 81, Polish track and field athlete, Olympic champion (1956).
- Om Prakash Malhotra, 93, Indian Army general.
- Frank Malzone, 85, American baseball player (Boston Red Sox, California Angels).
- Master Blaster, 28–29, Ugandan dancehall musician, shot.
- Ed Mayer, 84, American baseball player (Chicago Cubs).
- Pavel Srníček, 47, Czech footballer (Newcastle United, national team), European Championship runner-up (1996), complications from heart attack.
- Julio Tamussin, 72, Italian Olympic wrestler.

=== 30 ===
- George Andreadis, 79, Greek author.
- Doug Atkins, 85, American football player (Cleveland Browns, Chicago Bears, New Orleans Saints), NFL champion (1954, 1963).
- Jim Cruickshank, 79, Canadian bishop.
- Víctor Santiago Díaz, Puerto Rican politician, cancer.
- Howard Davis Jr., 59, American boxer, Olympic champion (1976), lung cancer.
- Lucinda Dooling, 61, Puerto Rican-born American actress (Lovely But Deadly, The Alchemist, 1941), complications from brain tumors.
- Chatral Sangye Dorje, 102, Tibetan yogi.
- George Elsey, 97, American military adviser.
- Eugene P. Foley, 87, American political strategist.
- Armand Lemieux, 89, Canadian ice hockey player.
- Mangesh Padgaonkar, 86, Indian poet.
- Howard Pawley, 81, Canadian politician, Premier of Manitoba (1981–1988).
- Luis Silva Parra, 84, Ecuadorian jazz saxophonist.
- Kinto Tamura, 87, Japanese voice actor (Kimba the White Lion).
- Zjef Vanuytsel, 70, Belgian folk and kleinkunst singer.
- Fritz Wechselberger, 77, Austrian Olympic ice hockey player (1964).
- Philoxenos Yuhanon, 74, Indian Syriac Orthodox bishop.

=== 31 ===
- Roman Bartoszcze, 69, Polish politician.
- Kurt Bieber, 86, American actor and model.
- Wesley Burrowes, 85, Irish playwright (Glenroe).
- Ted J. Case, 68, American biologist and ecologist, heart attack.
- Natalie Cole, 65, American Grammy-winning singer ("This Will Be", "Sophisticated Lady", "Inseparable") and actress, heart failure.
- Peter J. Costigan, 85, American politician, member of the New York State Assembly (1966–1974).
- Bronislav Danda, 85, Czech ice hockey player, bronze medalist at the 1955 World Ice Hockey Championships.
- Mike Frier, 46, American football player (Cincinnati Bengals, Seattle Seahawks), heart attack.
- Steve Gohouri, 34, Ivorian footballer (Wigan Athletic, national team). (body found on this date)
- Geoffrey Hawthorn, 74, British sociologist.
- Beth Howland, 74, American actress (Alice, The Love Boat, Company), lung cancer.
- Marion James, 81, American blues singer.
- Donal Leahy, 77, Irish footballer (Cork Celtic).
- Marvin Panch, 89, American racing driver, natural causes.
- Felix Pirani, 87, British theoretical physicist.
- Dino Pompanin, 85, Italian Olympic skier.
- Václav Pšenička Jr., 84, Czech Olympic weightlifter.
- Vern Rapp, 87, American baseball manager (St. Louis Cardinals, Cincinnati Reds).
- Dal Richards, 97, Canadian big band leader, prostate cancer.
- Wayne Rogers, 82, American actor (M*A*S*H, Ghosts of Mississippi, House Calls), complications from pneumonia.
- Daniel L. Ryan, 85, American Roman Catholic prelate, Bishop of Springfield in Illinois (1983–1999).
- Richard Sapper, 83, German industrial designer.
- Peter Wight, 85, Guyanese-born English cricketer (Somerset) and umpire.
