= Masadeh =

Masadeh (Arabic: مساعده) is an Arabic surname. Notable people with the surname include:

- Daifallah Masadeh (1938–2015), Jordanian lawyer and politician
- Salem Masadeh (1929 or 1930–2024), Jordanian lawyer and government minister
