= Jagne =

Jagne is a Gambian surname that may refer to

- Ablie Jagne (died 2015), Gambian footballer
- Baboucarr-Blaise Jagne (born 1955), foreign minister of the Gambia
- Ismaila Jagne (born 1984), Gambian football midfielder
- Modou Jagne (born 1983), Gambian footballer
- Omar Jagne (born 1992), Gambian football forward
- Pa Modou Jagne (born 1989), Gambian association football player
- Saihou Jagne (born 1986), Swedish-Gambian football striker
