= Hach =

Hach may refer to:

- Acylcarnitine hydrolase, enzyme that catalyses the hydrolysis of acylcarnitine
- Hach (surname), or people with that surname
- Hach Company, American water testing company
