= Nancy Clark =

Nancy Clark may refer to:

- Nancy B. Clark (fl. 2008–2017), American philatelist
- Nancy Randall Clark (1938–2015), American schoolteacher and politician from Maine
- Nancy Talbot Clark (1825–1901), American doctor
- Nancy Clark Reynolds (1927–2022), American television journalist

== See also ==
- Nancy Clarke (disambiguation)
