= Frank Salisbury =

Frank Salisbury is the name of:

- Frank O. Salisbury (1874–1962), English artist
- Frank B. Salisbury (1926–2015), American plant physiologist
- Frank Salisbury Harris, acting mayor of Albany, New York, 1944–1945
