= Nancy Clarke =

Nancy Clarke may refer to:

- Nancy Clarke (1945–2014), White House Chief Floral Designer
- Nancy Clarke (entrepreneur) (fl. 1791–1812), Barbadian free woman of colour and hotelier
- Nancy Clarke (swimmer), American competitor at the 1988 Summer Paralympics

== See also ==
- Nancy Clark (disambiguation)
