= Hach (surname) =

Hach is a surname. Notable people with the surname include:

- Heather Hach, American screenwriter, librettist and novelist
- Hans Hach Verdugo (born 1989), Mexican tennis player
- Irv Hach (1873–1936), American baseball player
- Kathryn Hach-Darrow (born 1922), American businesswoman
- Phila Hach (1926–2015), American chef
