= Duna Federico Kirbus =

Sand dune in Argentina

Coordinates: 27.5333°S 67.5667°W

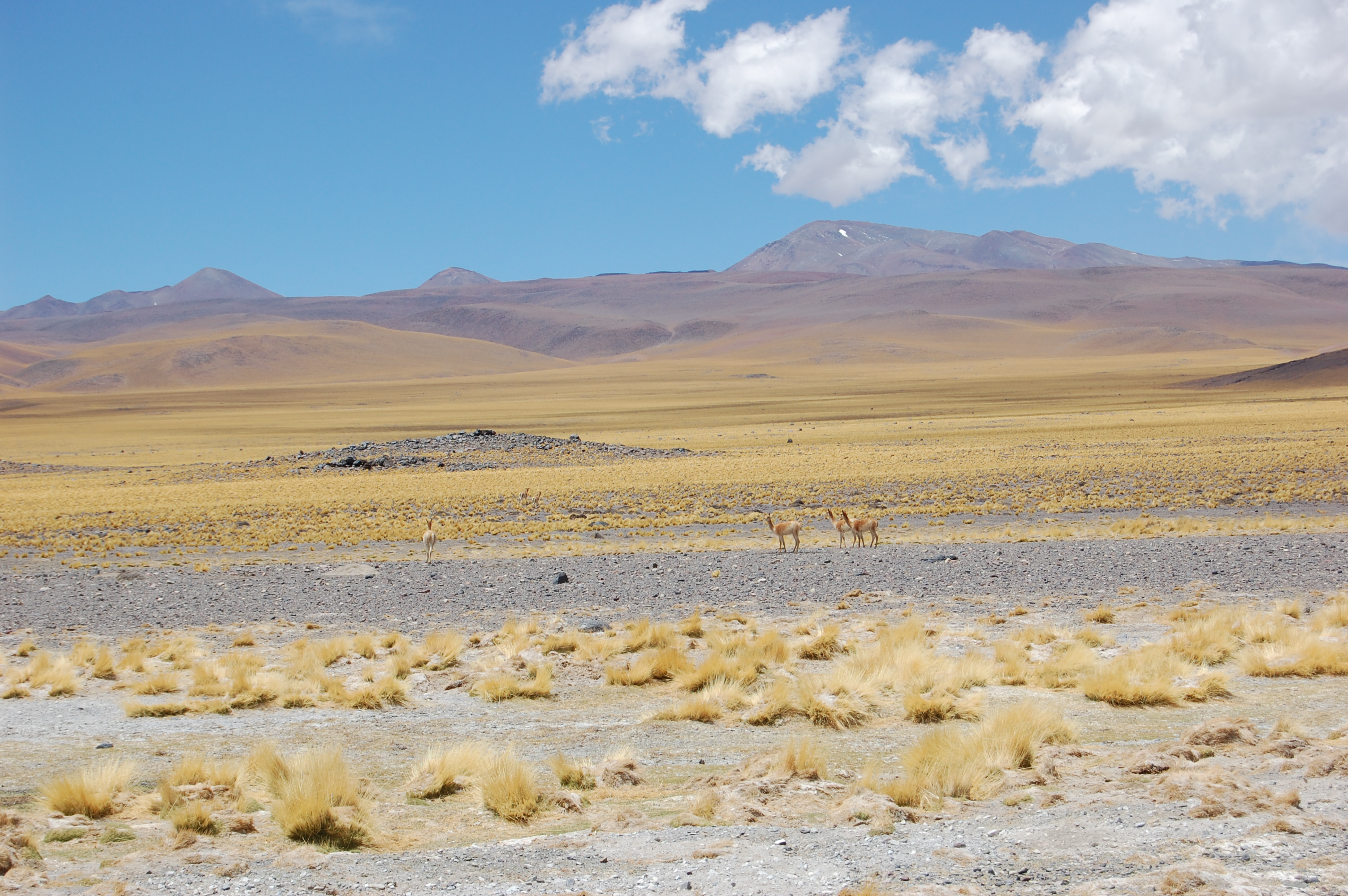
Bolsón de Fiambalá, location of the sand dune

The Duna Federico Kirbus is the highest sand dune in the world, located in the northwest of Argentina, in the Catamarca Province. It has a height of 1,230 metres (4,035 ft), making it taller than the highest point of 53 UN-recognized sovereign states. It is part of the Bolsón de Fiambalá, a semicircular sand valley.

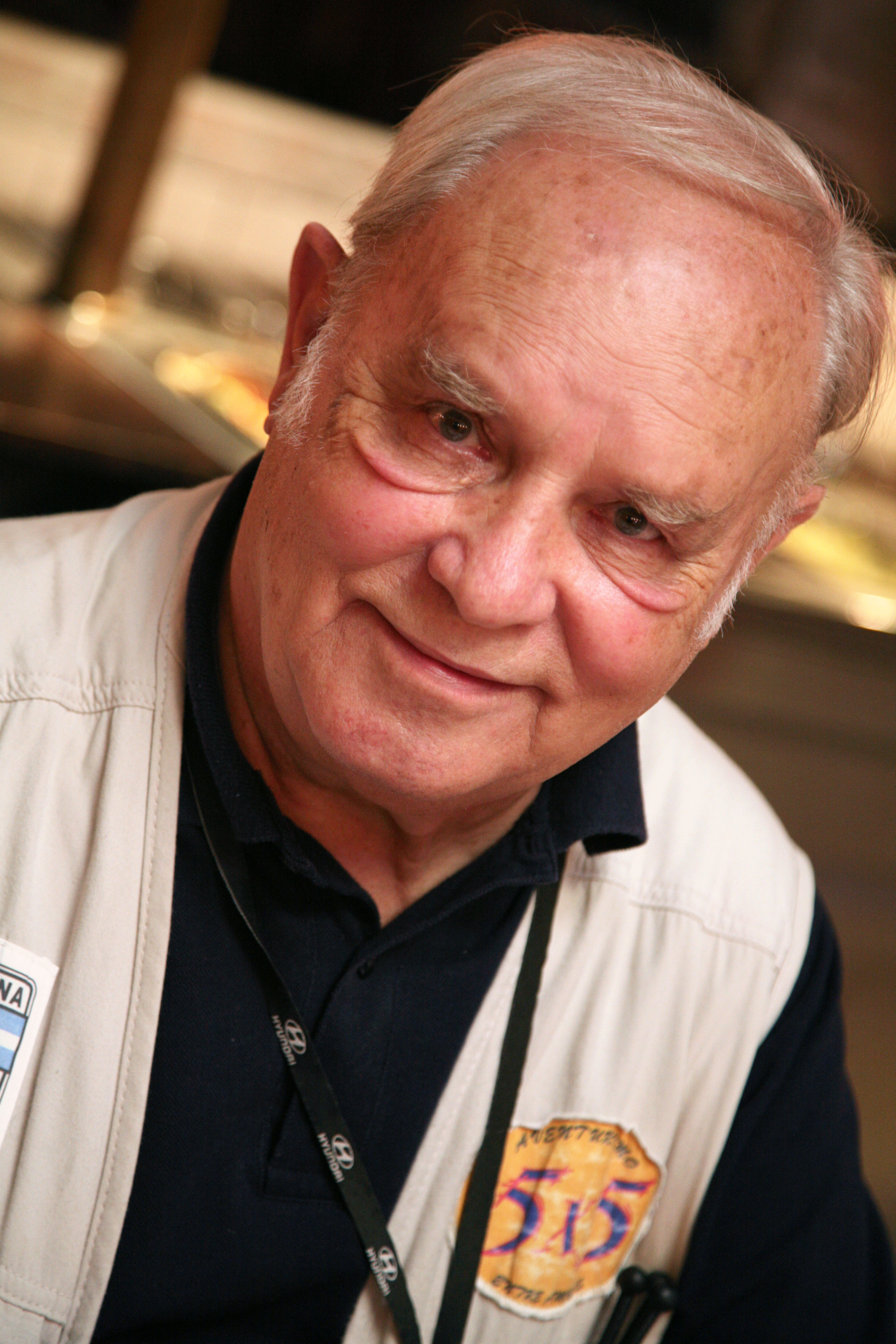
Federico Kirbus, namesake of the dune and the first person to determine its height

The dune is named after Argentine journalist and researcher Federico Kirbus, who discovered its real height. Duna Federico Kirbus is an example of a fixed-location, linear dune that does not move, although its surface is constantly modeled by the wind. Due to its high altitude and extremely dry climate, there is almost no vegetation..
