= Legends of Harley Drag Racing Museum =

Museum of motorcycle drag racing

- Location: 1126 South Saunders Street; Raleigh, North Carolina
- Coordinates: 35.7652°N 78.6496°W
- Type: Automotive, sports
- Website: http://www.rayprice-hd.com/default.asp?page=museum

Legends of Harley Drag Racing Museum is a museum located on the second floor of the Harley-Davidson dealership in Raleigh, North Carolina. The museum was created by motorcycle drag racing champion, designer and Sturgis Motorcycle Museum & Hall of Fame inductee Ray Price and features displays of drag racing motorcycles along with memorabilia from multiple riders including Price. It is the only Harley-Davidson drag racing museum in the world.
