= Kiki Divaris =

Greek fashion designer and war hero

Vasilliki Babaletakis "Kiki" Divaris (c. 13 September 1925 in Sparta – 5 December 2015) was a Greek fashion designer, model and the first white woman to have been declared a liberation war hero in Zimbabwe.

== Early life ==
Divaris grew up in Cape Town.

== Career ==
Divaris was a close friend of Robert Mugabe, his first wife Sally, and current wife, Grace. She created the Miss Zimbabwe beauty pageant. In 2012, at 88, she still ran the event. In 2013, she handed over the Miss Zimbabwe business to Mary Mubaiwa.

== Death ==
Divaris died in her sleep on 5 December 2015, at the Borrowdale Clinic Trauma Centre, Harare, Zimbabwe, from pneumonia. She was 90.
