= Virginia A. Myers =

American artist, professor and inventor

Virginia A. Myers (8 May 1927 – 7 December 2015) was an American artist, professor, and inventor. She was born in Greencastle, Indiana, and grew up with her parents and younger sister mostly in Cleveland, Ohio, where her father taught at various colleges and schools.

She studied at George Washington University and the Corcoran School of Art in Washington, D.C., and received her B.A. in drawing and painting in 1949. Then, in 1951 she went on to earn an M.F.A. in Painting from The California College of Arts and Crafts, Oakland. Myers completed post-graduate work at the University of Illinois (Urbana) and in 1955 came to the University of Iowa to study printmaking with Mauricio Lasansky. From 1961 to 1962, Myers studied in Paris at Atelier 17 with Stanley William Hayter under a Fulbright Scholarship.

To supplement her income while completing post-graduate work in Iowa, Myers learned how to gild picture frames with silver lead. This work inspired her to incorporate silver and gold leaf in her intaglio prints.

In 1962 Myers became an instructor at the University of Iowa, where she taught printmaking classes in the School of Art and Art History - she was the only woman teaching studio courses at this time. Myers would go on to earn a faculty position at the University of Iowa. In 1985 Myers attended a seminar taught by Glenn. E Hutchinson (President of Universal Stamping and Embossing Company). From this seminar, Myers learned of foil stamping and began to more seriously pursue this aspect of her artistic practice.

Myers taught intaglio printmaking and foil imaging, made possible by her invention of the Iowa Foil Printer, which makes use of the commercial foil stamping process. After the invention of the press, she worked in conjunction with community members and students to improve and document the printmaking process of foil stamping using the Iowa Foil Press, and they collectively produced a book, Foil Imaging...A New Art Form, in 2001.

She presented in more than 100 one-person exhibitions in the United States and abroad, and participated in more than 150 juried exhibitions and traveling shows nationally and internationally. Her work is included in collections at the National Museum of Women in the Arts, Washington, D.C.; the Toledo Museum of Art, Toledo, Ohio; and the Des Moines Art Center, Des Moines, Iowa, among others.
