= Omar Jagne =

Gambian footballer

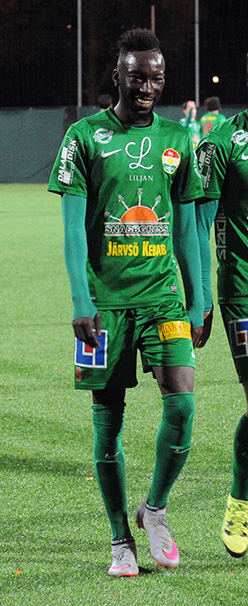

Personal information
- Date of birth: 10 June 1992 (age 34)
- Place of birth: Gambia
- Height: 1.80 m (5 ft 11 in)
- Position: Forward

Team information
- Current team: Bullermyrens IK

Senior career*
Years	Team	Apps	(Gls)
2011–2012	Falu FK		
2013–2017	Dalkurd FF	80	(19)
2017	Ljungskile SK	16	(0)
2018	Syrianska FC	0	(0)
2018–	Bullermyrens IK	10	(10)

International career^{‡}
2015–	Gambia	4	(1)
- * Club domestic league appearances and goals as of 2 May 2018 Club 2019 newroz fc = Club 2020 IFK Haninge ‡ National team caps and goals as of 19 June 2016

Omar Jagne (born 10 June 1992) is a Gambian footballer who plays as a forward for IFK Haninge in the Swedish Division 1, the domestic fifth tier.
