= Salem Masadeh =

Jordanian politician (1929/1930–2024)

Personal details
- Born: 1929 or 1930
- Died: 26 December 2024 (aged 94)
- Education: Damascus

Salem Masadeh (Arabic: سالم مساعده; 1929 or 1930 – 26 December 2024) was a Jordanian lawyer and government minister.

== Background ==
Masadeh completed his high school in Jordan and graduated from Damascus University in 1954 with a law degree. He died on 26 December 2024, at the age of 94.

== Career ==
Masadeh started his career as a judge in Jordan (1958–1970). He then became the governor of Amman and the deputy prime minister (1970–1972).

Masadeh served as Minister of Justice (1972–1974) in Ahmad Louzi's government, and in the following government he was minister of Finance (1974–1976). He then served briefly in Mudar Badran's first government. In the next three years, he worked in the private sector as a lawyer.

In 1979, Masadeh was asked to serve as the minister of Finance again. After prime minister Shareef Abed El Hameed Sharaf died three years later, Masadeh continued as the finance minister under Mudar's Badran's third administration until 1984.

Masadeh returned to the private sector for five years. In 1989, an economic crisis hit Jordan, after Zaid al-Rifai's government. Masadeh was called back into Zaid ibn Shaker's government as vice prime minister, and minister of Interior affairs. Eight months later, the prime minister resigned and Mudar Badran took office as the prime minister. Masadeh was assigned again as the vice Prime minister and minister of Interior Affairs for the last time.

After retiring from the government, Masadeh served as a member of the Jordanian Senate. He also became a board of trustees member of the Islamic Bank, Jordan Steel, and Yarmouk University.
