= Karen Friesicke =

German comedian and actress

- Born: 11 April 1962; Hamburg, West Germany
- Died: 25 December 2015 (aged 53); Hamburg, Germany
- Occupations: Comedian, Actress

Karen Christine Friesicke (11 April 1962 – 25 December 2015) was a German comedian and actress.

Friesicke is best known to German audiences for her TV sketches. In 1996 she joined Ingolf Lück, Anke Engelke, Bastian Pastewka and Marco Rima in a regular nationwide series, the Wochenshow ('The Weekly Show').

Prior to these TV performances, she appeared with Peer Augustinski in the comedy series Harald und Eddi ('Harald and Eddi') with popular nation comic icons Harald Juhnke and Eddi Arent. She lived in Hamburg with her two sons and was engaged with the Freie Schauspielschule Hamburg ('Hamburg Free Theatre').

According to a January 2016 press report, Karen Friesicke committed suicide.

== Filmography (selection) ==
Year	Title	Role	Director
2011	Our Little Differences	Frau Weiss	Sylvie Michel Casey
2005	Ludmilla möchte tanzen gehen (Educational)	Ludmilla	Sabine Bernardi
2003	Spy Sorge	Helma Ott	Masahiro Shinoda
2002	One Hell of a Night	Janine	Stephan Wagner
2000	Tour Abroad	The prostitute	Ayse Polat
1998	St. Pauli Night	Caro	Sönke Wortmann
1997	Aimée & Jaguar	Marlene	Max Färberböck
1995	Abbuzze! Der Badesalz-Film	Expectant mother	Roland Willert
1995	The Killer's Mother	Jennifer (Main role)	Volker Einrauch

== TV (selection) ==
Year	Title	Role	Director
2014	Die Wette (ARD)	Manageress	Tomy Wigand
2010	Katie Fforde – Zum Teufel mit David (ARD)	Olivia Tucker	John Delbridge
2009	SOKO Wismar – Drunter und drüber (ZDF)	Lore Petersen (EHR)	Hans-Christoph Blumenberg
2009	Da kommt Kalle – Chaos in der Gartenkolonie (ZDF)	Brigitte Hintze	Patrick Winczewski
2009	Die Pfefferkörner – Ein neues Team (ARD)		Elsa Grawert
2009	Luises Versprechen (ARD)	Frau Schneeweiss	Berno Kürten
2008	Our Charly – Chimpanse mit Herz, Mit allen Tricks, Mausefallen (ZDF)	Lina Krüger	Carl Lang
2006	In aller Freundschaft – Eine zweite Chance (ARD)	Veronika Morgenstern	Peter Wekwerth
2006	Die Kinder der Flucht – Breslau brennt (ZDF)	Frau Motz	Hans-Christoph Blumenberg
2004	Großstadtrevier (ARD/NDR)		Hans Erich Viet
2003	Unter Brüdern – Wann ist ein Mann ein Mann? - TV series (RTL)	Helena (EHR)	Stefan Lukschy
2003	SK Kölsch – Familienbande (Sat1)	Nicole Schäfer (EHR)	Peter Ristau
2003	Dr. Sommerfeld – Neues vom Bülowbogen – Schwesterherz (ARD)	Ulrike Schmidt	Alexander Wiedl
2002	Aus lauter Liebe zu Dir (ARD)	Bea Rautenberg	Ariane Zeller
2002	Herz oder Knete (ARD)		Michael Rowitz
2002	Herzschlag – Auf Messers Schneide, Letzte Chance (ZDF)	Peggy Schmitz (20 episodes)	
2001	Der Held an meiner Seite (ZDF)	Marga Uhde	Peter Deutsch
2001	Stahlnetz – PSI (ARD)	Eva Weiss	Markus Imboden
2001	Victor – Der Schutzengel (TV series) (Sat1)	Pia	Carl Lang
2000	Anke – Anke, ich bin viel zu fett! (Sat 1)	Vera Schwarzenberg	
2000	Das Amt - TV series (RTL)	Bürgermeisterin Hemmer (13 episodes)	Various
1999	Scheidung auf Rädern (ZDF)	Frau Hellmer	Christine Kabisch
1999	Im Namen des Gesetzes – Tod auf Raten (RTL)	Eva Carnier	Carl Lang
1999	Küstenwache – Feuer an Bord (ZDF)	Jaqueline Sievers	Carl Lang
1999	Aus gutem Haus - TV series (ARD)	Conny Leonberg (7 episodes)	Lars Jessen, u.a.
1998	Wiedersehen in Palma (ZDF)	Elsa Tahun (HR)	Bettina Woernle
1998	Der Hochstapler (ARD)	Corinna Stein	Martin Buchhorn
1998	Wut im Bauch (ARD/NDR)	Kundin mit Kind	Claus Michael Rohne
1998	Drunter & Drüber - TV series (ZDF)	Lara	Helmut Metzger
1997	Ein kleiner Dachschaden (ZDF)	Ulla	Joachim Roering
1997	Adelheid und ihre Mörder - Schuss in den Ofen (ARD)	Frau Krüger	
1997	Heimatgeschichten - Zwei süße Früchtchen (ARD)	Jaqueline Kalinke	
1996	Alles wegen Robert De Niro (ARD)	Margrit	Helmut Förnbacher
1996	Die Wochenshow (Sat1)	Various	Various
1995	Ach Du Fröhliche (ARD/NDR)	Evelyn	
1994	Theaterdonner (ZDF)		Stefan Lukschy
1993	Tatort - Tod auf Neuwerk (ARD)	Annegret Schwarz	Helmut Förnbacher
1987-90	Harald und Eddi (ARD) (30 episodes)	Various	Various
1989	Herakles Höhle (SWF)		Lutz Dammbeck

== Theatre ==
Year	Title	Role	Director	Theatre
2014	TouTou	Zoé	Uli Sandau	Theater Partout
2013-14	Uns Oma is over the Ocean	Frau Reimers	Michael Jurgons	Engelsaal Hamburg
2012-13	DamenLikörChor – Die Diven sind unter uns			St. Pauli Theater
2011	The Physicists	Marthe Boll	Wolf-Dietrich Sprenger	Ernst Deutsch Theater
2010-11	Elling	Elise	Michael Bogdanov	Hamburger Kammerspiele
2010	The Merry Wives of Windsor	Miss Ford	M. v. Bismarck	Theater Moenkhof
2007	Kikerikiste	Bartholomäus	Annette Uhlen	Tournée
1999	5. Kolonie		Christian Kohlund	Ernst Deutsch Theater
1995	Dr. Ratte	Ärztin	Stefan Barbarino	Hamburger Kammerspiele
1991	Ein Fest für Vera	Vera	Hans Man in't Feld	Kampnagel
1990	The Master and Margarita	Gella		PANtheater
1989	Hamletmaschine	Ophelia	Robert Wilson	Thalia Theater
1988	The Sunshine Boys	Nurse	Hanno Lunin	Hamburger Kammerspiele
