= Robert Kobayashi =

American artist

- Robert Kobayashi
- Born: Robert Hiroshi Kobayashi; May 5, 1925; Territory of Hawaii
- Died: December 14, 2015 (aged 90)

Robert Kobayashi (1925–2015) was a Hawaiʻi-born artist who made abstract expressionist paintings at the beginning of his career and later produced pointillist paintings and pointillist-derived sculptures in the folk art tradition. Known for the "whimsical, childlike quality" of his work, he rarely exhibited in commercial galleries, preferring to work and display his creations in a studio called "Moe's Meat Market" that he and his wife owned in the NoLita section of Manhattan.

== Early life and training ==
Kobayashi was born and raised in Honolulu, Hawaii. His parents having divorced before he was five, he and his four sisters lived with his mother on the northern fringe of the business district. After graduating from high school in 1944, he served in the U.S. Army until the end of World War II and then enrolled in the studio school of the Honolulu Art Academy. (Note: The art school of the Honolulu Art Academy (later Honolulu Museum of Art) began in 1946 on the grounds of the academy. A man named Bill Stamper (husband of children's book author Martha Alexander) had convinced the board of directors to provide a place for returning GIs to study art. The Honolulu Museum of Art School (formerly the Academy Art Center at Linekona) was established in 2006 and is a different institution.) His instructors there included Louis Pohl and Willson Stamper, (Note: Other students at the time included Tadashi Sato, Raymond Hahn, and Wally Ige.) the latter of whom became Kobayashi's mentor. In 1949 Kobayashi moved to New York to study at the Brooklyn Museum Art School under John Ferren and in 1950 temporarily left the school in order to spend much of the year in Paris where his sister, Fumi, was then living. In 1954 he was hired as caretaker for the Museum of Modern Art's Japanese Exhibition House. (Note: Although Kobayashi had never been to Japan and knew little about Japanese domestic architecture or gardens, he was able to solve problems he encountered through research in a nearby public library.) (Note: The Japanese Exhibition House was built using traditional materials in a style appropriate for a scholar, government official, or priest. Known as Shofuso, the house was designed by Junzo Yoshimura in 1953 and assembled along with a Japanese garden, on the grounds of the Museum of Modern Art. The last of three buildings in a series called "The House in the Museum Garden," it remained in New York through 1954 and is now located in Philadelphia's West Fairmount Park.) After the house exhibit closed, Kobayashi stayed on as a warehouse worker at the museum, working there, with brief interruptions, until 1978.

== Career ==
Before he opened his own gallery Kobayashi rarely offered his work for sale to the public. In 1950 he showed sculpture in the New York gallery owned by Samuel M. Kootz. (Note: Other artists in this group show included Clement Greenberg, Helen Frankenthaler, Alice Hodges, Fred Hauck, Harold Shapinsky, and Constantino Nivola.) In the late 1950s and early 1960s he showed works in an artist cooperative, the Brata Gallery. (Note: One of the East Village's 10th Street galleries, Brata was organized by John and Nicholas Krushenick in 1957 and 17 founding members. In addition to Kobayashi they included Al Held, Ronald Bladen, George Sugarman and Yayoi Kusama. Nicholas Krushenick probably became acquainted with Kobayashi during the time they both worked at the Museum of Modern Art, the one in the frame shop, the other in the warehouse.) He was given his first solo exhibition in 1962 in a gallery called Gima's in Honolulu. (Note: Located in Waikiki, Gima's Art Gallery was owned by Takeo Gima. During the 1950s and 1960s, it was one of only a few commercial art galleries in Honolulu.) In 1977 Kobayashi and his wife bought a building in what was then a run-down section of New York's Little Italy and turned its storefront shop into a gallery. The storefront had been a butcher shop called Moe's Meat Market and that became the name of the gallery as well. They made living quarters and a studio upstairs and rented out apartments in the upper stories. Kobayashi showed his own and other artists' work intermittently during the first few years and in 2000 his wife and curator Phyllis Stigliano opened the gallery to the public as a full-time commercial gallery devoted to his work. Stigliano also began showing his work at her gallery in Brooklyn. (Note: Moe's Meat Market is located at 237 Elizabeth Street in a district that is now called NoLita. Kobayashi would change displays of his work in the storefront but not often open the shop to customers.) In 1980 Kobayashi was given a solo exhibition at the Equator folk art gallery in SoHo and in 2001 he contributed work to a group exhibition at the Luise Ross Gallery on 57th Street. In 2009 he showed with two friends, Satoru Abe and Harry Tsuchindana, in a multi-gallery exhibition in Honolulu's Luxury Row & Cedar Street Galleries.

Kobayashi's appearances in exhibitions at museums and non-commercial galleries were also infrequent. As a student, in 1950, he participated in a show of 23 painters that his teacher John Ferren presented in New York's Argent Gallery. (Note: The Argent Gallery was run by the National Association of Women Painters and Sculptors. Founded in 1930, the gallery was mainly used to show work by the group's members, but in between these exhibitions it was made available for uses such as Ferren's show.) In 1952 he showed at the Honolulu Academy of Arts and a year later at Brooklyn Museum. In 1988, after seeing his work at Moe's Meat Market, Phyllis Stigliano put together a large exhibition of his work at the Nassau County Museum of Art and the following year he was included in two group shows, one at the Wunsch Arts Center in Glen Cove, N.Y., and the other at the Museum of Modern Art. In 2002 he contributed works to an exhibition in the East Galleries, New York University, and in 2005 he was included in a show at the Contemporary Museum, Honolulu.

On two occasions Kobayashi contributed drawings to publications. In 1991 he wrote and illustrated Maria Mazaretti Loves Spaghetti (Alfred A. Knopf, N.Y.). The book consists of two short stories, both of them based on the habits of his neighbor across the street, Mary Albanese. Writing in Newsday, a reviewer said "Kobayashi's full-page illustrations here are ebullient and his text has that special kind of simple, gentle humor that signifies a classic." He also made illustrations for a book written by a second grade student at Mariners Elementary School in Newport Beach, California and produced in a self-publishing house by her father: Annie and the Magic Book by Grace Vaughan (27 pages, AuthorHouse, Bloomington, Indiana, 2012).

=== Artistic style ===
Robert Kobayashi, "Seascape," 1981, oil on canvas, 42.5 x 42.5 inches

Until the mid-1960s Kobayashi made paintings and sculptures in an abstract expressionist style. In 1950 Stuart Preston of The New York Times described a sculpture of his as a "restless and urgent abstract." A few years later another critic said his works were "based on a wiry, expansive imagery composed of tensile lines vibrating from central axes." From the mid-1960s to the mid-1980s he made pointillist paintings, some of them in a surrealist style. His painting, "Seascape" was completed toward the end of this period. In a surrealist manner it shows a sandy shore on which the waves have cast up a button, a pocket watch, a lock, and a fork. As one critic noted, its technique is pointillist and its style draws on folk and native art.

Robert Kobayashi, "Nine White Flowers," 2013, ceiling tin and shaped metal with paint and nails on wood, 15.5 x 13.5 inches

After he moved into the building that contained Moe's Meat Market, he began to work in sheet metal, making portraits and still lifes using metal obtained from discarded stamped ceiling tin and cans that had held olive oil, beer, or ground coffee. These pieces, which a critic dubbed "clouages," were nailed into a wood frames and contained decorative patterns made of many tiny nails. Critics saw them as strange and whimsical, a kind of idiosyncratic folk art having a childlike quality. One late piece in this style is "Nine White Flowers" of 2013. A critic noted that "despite the coldness one would expect from the medium of tin, Kobi’s work subtly suggests a gentle wit and a delicate touch. The rigid nature of the metal is softened into a suppleness of shape and color. The chill warms with the nimble diligence of his fingers guided with the expressiveness of his affectionate mind."

Robert Kobayashi, "Flowers Seeking Affection," 2002, ceiling tin and shaped metal with paint and nails on wood, 20 x 22 inches

Throughout his career Kobayashi made free-standing sculptures as well as wall-mounted works. Some of these were toy-like objects such as a cat in a four-poster bed fashioned out of an old radio, a stool with sneakers on its four legs, and wooden puppets. Others were more traditionally artistic, such as portraits of friends and relatives or flower arrangements. "Flowers Seeking Affection" (2002) is an example of the last named. A critic said, "within these flowers there is the charm in the uniqueness of each bloom gesturing with personality."

== Personal life and family ==
Kobayashi was born on May 5, 1925. His father, Hiroshi Kobayashi, was a post office clerk, born in Hawaii Territory in 1896. Having obtained a divorce in the early 1920s, Kobayashi's mother, Yoshimi Kusaka Kobayashi, had full responsibility for raising him and his four sisters. (Note: Hiroshi and Yoshimi were married in Honolulu on May 18, 1918. His parents were Fujitoro Kobayashi and Tsugi Hokajima. Her parents were Kikujiro (also known as George) and Hana Kusaka. The marriage record lists Hiroshi's name as Shiroshi.) (Note: His sisters were Keiko (also known as Betty), eight years older; Fumi (also known as Peggy), six years older; Hiroko (also known as Ruby), three years older; and Tasako (also known as Lillian), two years younger. At the time of his death only Lillian was still living. By 1940, with the five children all still living at home, his mother was working in a canning factory, two sisters were maids in private households, and one was a secretary.) Kobayashi attended local schools in Honolulu and graduated in 1945 from McKinley High School. (Note: An artist friend of Kobayashi's, the sculptor Satoru Abe, also attended McKinley, and, like Kobayashi, moved to New York after World War II.) He joined the U.S. Army in April 1945, served as a private with an Army tank battalion in Germany, and was discharged not long after the war came to a close.

In 1946, at the urging of his sister Fumi (or Peggy), he used the G.I. Bill to attend art school, first in Honolulu and then in New York. (Note: He credited Fumi with encouraging him to pursue art before he graduated from high school, for pointing out the advantages of study under the G.I. Bill, and for getting him to move to New York (where she, then a student at Barnard College, was already living).) He spend about a year in Paris and in the mid-1950s obtained work first as a gardener and later as part of the warehouse staff at the Museum of Modern Art. He left the museum in 1978 having bought the building that contained Moe's Meat Market the year before. (Note: Kobayashi and his wife bought 237 Elizabeth Street in 1977. Even though local drug dealing kept prices down at that time, they considered the amount they paid to be unusually reasonable. Soon after they moved in, and for the next 40 years, prices rose dramatically. A butcher shop had existed there since the 1940s. Run by Vincenzo Albanese, it was named after his son, Moe. By the time Kobayashi and his wife bought the building the business had moved across to 238 Elizabeth Street . The shop sign, "Moe's Meat Market," remained, however, and they did not replace it. The butcher shop across the street was named Albanese Meats and Poultry. A native Italian, Vincenzo was not comfortable speaking English to his customers, and his wife, Mary, who had been born and raised in the neighborhood, dealt with customers. In time, she and Kobayashi became friends and his book, Maria Mazaretti Loves Spaghetti is a fictionalized description of her neighborly ways. When Vincenzo retired, his son Moe took over the store and, in consequence, the Albanese butcher shop is sometimes called Moe's Meat Market.) Some years after Moe's Meat Market was transformed into a full-time gallery, Kobayashi's health began to fail. He and his wife then returned to Honolulu, and bought a home in the Manoa neighborhood where he died on December 14, 2015.

Other names used

Kobayashi used the nickname Kobi, as in Kobi Kobayashi. In the United States Census of 1930 his given name appears as Hiroshi. In the Census of 1940 it appears as Robert. His obituary in the New York Times gives his full name as Robert Hiroshi Kobayashi.
