= Walter Keller (ice hockey) =

Swiss ice hockey player

- Born: 26 October 1933; Switzerland
- Died: 16 December 2015 (aged 82)
- Position: Left Wing
- Shot: Left
- National team: Switzerland
- Playing career: 1953–1959

Walter Keller (28 October 1933 – 16 December 2015) was a Swiss ice hockey player who competed for the Swiss national team at the 1956 Winter Olympics in Cortina d'Ampezzo.
