= John Ford (footballer, born 1931) =

Australian rules footballer

Personal information
- Full name: John William Ford
- Born: 24 August 1931
- Died: 29 December 2015 (aged 84)
- Original team: Ararat
- Height: 178 cm (5 ft 10 in)
- Weight: 67 kg (148 lb)

Playing career^{1}
Years	Club	Games (Goals)
1953	Fitzroy	1 (0)
- ^{1} Playing statistics correct to the end of 1953.

John William Ford (24 August 1931 – 29 December 2015) was an Australian rules footballer who played with Fitzroy in the Victorian Football League (VFL).
