= David L. Brower =

American politician (1932–2015)

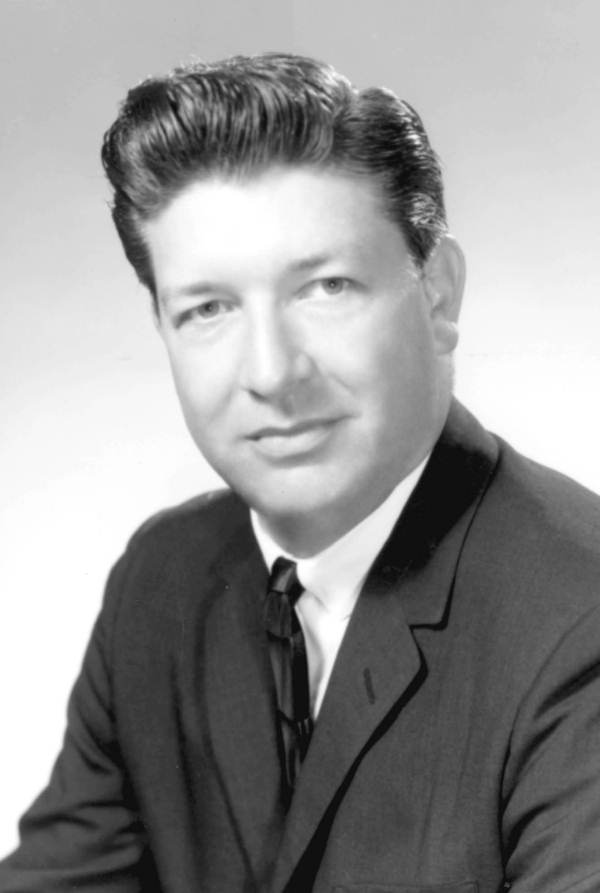

Member of the Florida House of Representatives for the 111th district
- In office 1966–1968

Personal details
- Born: May 26, 1932 Miami, Florida
- Died: December 27, 2015 (aged 83)
- Party: Democratic, later Republican

David L. Brower (May 26, 1932 – December 27, 2015) was an American politician from the state of Florida.

Brower was born in Miami. He was president of Brower Press Incorporated, a real estate and investments firm. He served in the Florida House of Representatives from 1966 to 1968, as a Democrat until he switched parties and became a Republican. While in office, he represented the 111th district.

Brower died on December 27, 2015, at the age of 83.
