= Edgar Rosenberg (professor) =

American scholar (1925–2015)

Edgar Rosenberg (September 21, 1925 – December 19, 2015) was an American scholar and Professor of English and Comparative Literature at Cornell University from 1965 until his retirement in 2002.

== Early life and education ==
Born to Jewish parents in Fuerth, Germany, Rosenberg fled Nazi Germany for Switzerland and then Haiti in 1939, reaching New York City in 1940. He knew no English. After graduating from high school he enlisted in the U.S. Army and served in Europe, receiving a Combat Infantry medal in 1944.

On his return he enrolled in Cornell University, attending on the G.I. bill, and earned a B.A. in 1949 and M.A. in 1950. After receiving a Ph.D at Stanford University in 1958 he taught at Harvard University until 1965. While there, his popular course on the history of the novel earned high praise, and he published both scholarship and fiction. He joined Cornell in 1965 as a tenured associate professor, retiring in 2002 as Emeritus Professor of English and Comparative Literature.

== Scholarship and teaching ==
Rosenberg was described as a "fascinating and terrifying" teacher by Gerald Howard, writing for The Chronicle of Higher Education. He is the author of From Shylock to Svengali: Jewish Stereotypes in English Fiction (1960) and some fifty pieces of short fiction, translations, and articles in journals ranging from Esquire to Commentary to The Dickensian. His Norton critical edition of Charles Dickens' Great Expectations (1999) "stands not only as the authoritative edition of that novel but also as a landmark of erudition and a joyful sharing of a life of learning.". In addition to Cornell, he taught at San Jose State College and Harvard University, was Visiting Professor at Stanford University and the University of Haifa, and received Guggenheim, Fulbright, Bread Loaf, and Stanford Fiction Fellowships as well as the Clark Distinguished Teaching Award at Cornell.
