= Zoulikha Nasri =

Moroccan jurist and politician

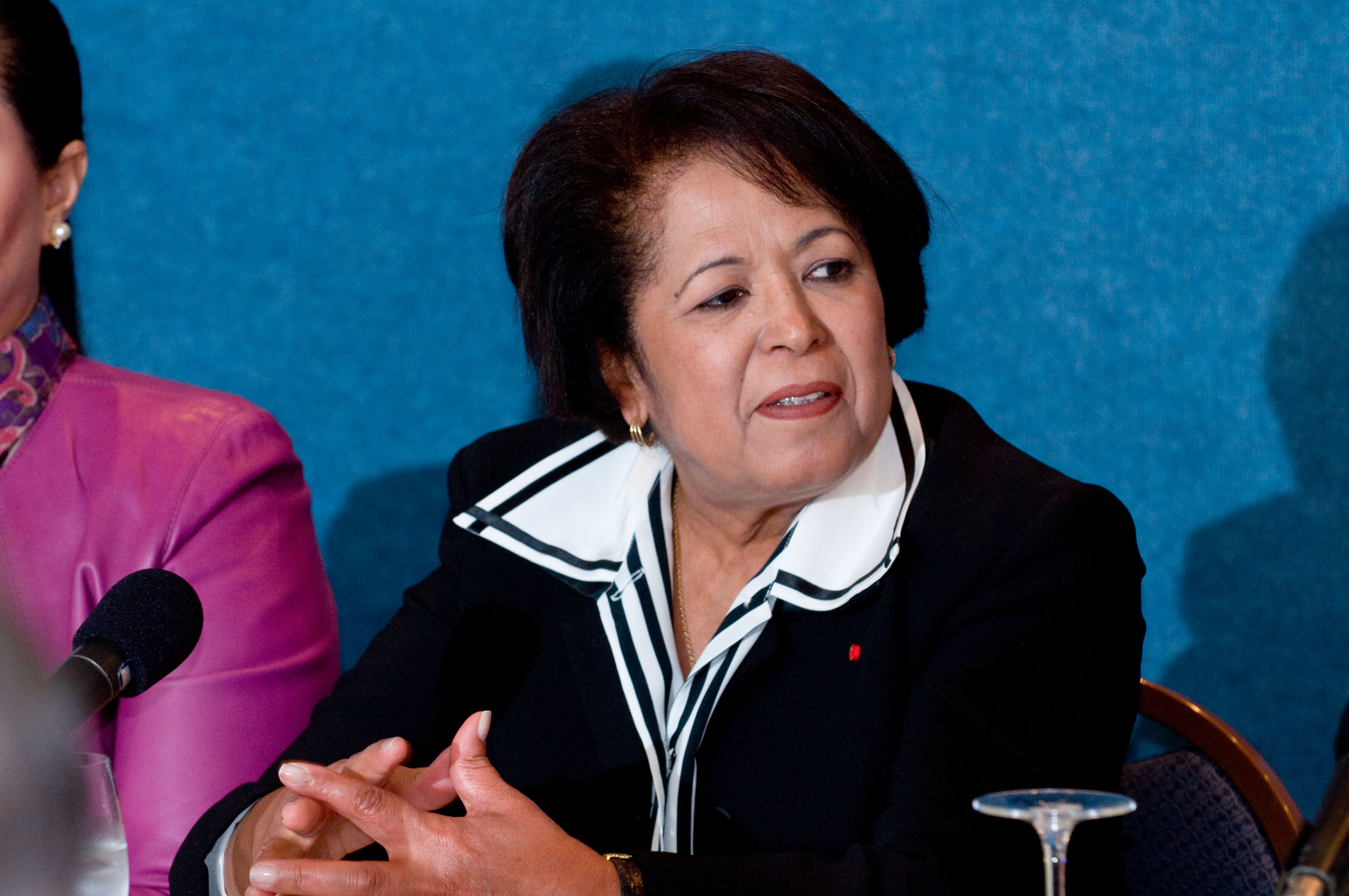
- Zoulikha Nasri at a press meeting on Land Day, 2010

Personal details
- Born: 1945 Oujda, Morocco
- Died: 16 December 2015 (aged 69–70)

Zoulikha Nasri (1945 – 16 December 2015) was a Moroccan politician. She was an advisor to King Mohammed VI and managing director of the Mohammed V Foundation for Solidarity. She was Morocco's first female royal advisor.

== Biography ==
Nasri was born in Oujda, Morocco, a city in northeast Morocco, near the Algerian border, in 1945. After earning a Masters of Law at the Mohammed V University in Rabat, she enrolled in the National School of Administration, graduating in 1967 in finance and economics 3. Following graduation, she traveled to France to work in private law at the Institute of Insurance of Lyon.

She then joined the Moroccan Ministry of Finance as an official. She rose through the ranks until her appointment in 1994, head of the Directorate of Insurance.

In August 1997, she was appointed Secretary of State to the Minister of Social Affairs, in charge of the National Mutual Aid in Government Filali III 4.

In 1998, she was called to join the royal cabinet as Counsellor of the sovereign in charge of social and economic affairs. She was appointed by the late King Hassan II. In 1999, she participated in creating the Mohammed V Solidarity Foundation, and was appointed associate director.

She died in December 2015 in Rabat.
