= Federico Kirbus =

Argentine journalist and author (1931–2015)

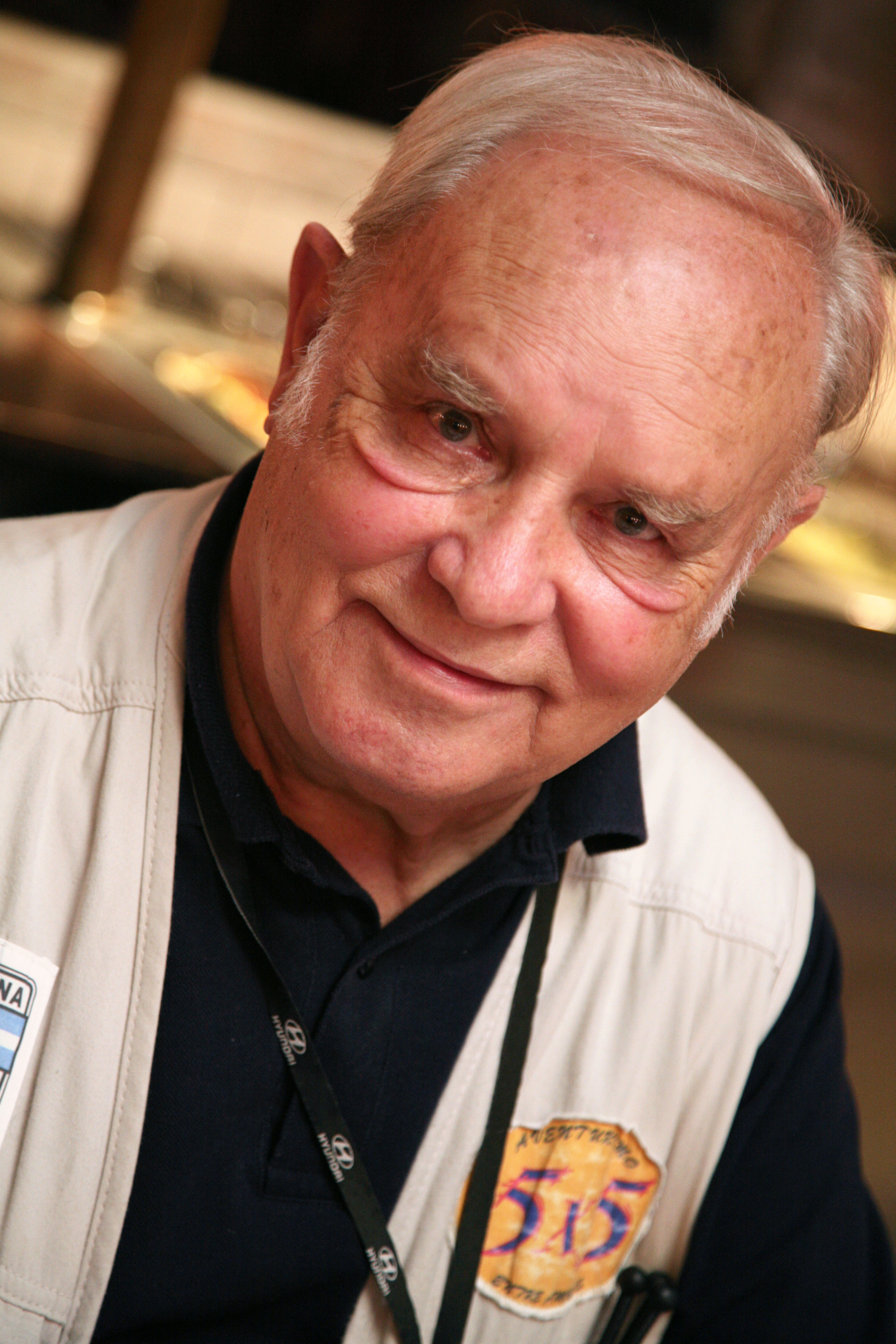
- Born: 14 October 1931
- Died: 12 December 2015 (aged 84)
- Occupation: Journalist

Federico Kirbus (14 October 1931 – 12 December 2015) was an Argentine journalist, writer, and researcher.

== Career ==
He published articles in publications such as Velocidad, El Gráfico, Motor, A Todo Motor, Aire & Sol, La Prensa, La Nación, Diario Clarín, Argentinisches Tageblatt, Autoclub, Automóvil Revue (Switzerland), Road & Track, and Car and Driver (US). He covered many races at home and abroad. He toured with Juan Manuel Fangio in Europe and joined the racing team Mercedes-Benz in 1955.

He worked as a tourism writer in much of Argentina. He journalistically promoted locations such as Ischigualasto (Moon Valley), Talampaya and Route 40. His primary activity was testing cars, a task performed for over half a century.

In 1978, he wrote "Clouds in a train" about the Train to the Clouds, shortly before it closed for lack of passengers. In 1983, he visited the Llanos of La Rioja and published an article that would last in the public domain and tourism as "The Way of the Warlords" (Autoclub).

== Personal life ==
He married Marlu Kirbus (1940–2013).

== Recognition ==
- Mention Rolex Award by the First Foundation in Buenos Aires Escobar (1980)
- Sergeant Frederick, a hill of 6168 m located between summits and Peñas Blue Bonnet, in the great circle of volcanoes in the province of La Rioja was named for him (27°S 57.6°W).
- Certificate of Merit of the Konex Awards (1987).
- Duna Federico Kirbus, the tallest sand dune in the world, is named after him

== Publications ==
- The Life Story of Juan Manuel Fangio (1956)
- La Primera de las Tres Buenos Aires (1980)
- Preparación de Motores de Competición (1975)
- Guía de Aventuras y Turismo (1982)
- El fabuloso Tren a las Nubes y otros ferrocarriles de montaña (1993)
- ARGENTINA, País de Maravillas (1993)
- Ruta Cuarenta y Mágica Ruta 40 (1994)
- Cordillera de los Andes y el fraude de las momias de los niños del Llullaillaco
- Autobiografía
- El Tesoro del Inca (1978).
- Enigmas, Misterios y Secretos de América (1977)
- Bombas Atómicas sobre Buenos Aires
- FLORENCIA, COLÓN Y EL DESCUBRIMIENTO (2010)
