= Sam Ibiam =

Nigerian footballer (1925–2015)

Personal information
- Full name: Sam Henshaw Ibiam
- Date of birth: 4 April 1925
- Place of birth: Nigeria
- Date of death: 2 December 2015 (aged 90)
- Position: Goalkeeper

Youth career
- Calabar XI
- Port Harcourt XI

Senior career*
Years	Team	Apps	(Gls)
1949–1952	Railway F.C.		
- Pan Bank F.C.
- SCOA XI
1954–1958	Africa Great Olympics		
1958–1960	Onitsha Redoutable		

International career
1949–1958	Nigeria		
- * Club domestic league appearances and goals

Sam Henshaw Ibiam (4 April 1925 – 2 December 2015), popularly known as The Black Magnet during his playing days, was a Nigerian footballer who played as a goalkeeper for the pioneer Nigerian national football team who were regarded as the "1949 UK Tourists". He retired from international football in 1958.

== Playing career ==
Sam Ibiam's career came to limelight while with the Port Harcourt XI. In recognition of his achievements, Sam Ibiam was honored during the "First National Sports Award for Sports Heroes and Heroines of Yesteryear".

== Coaching career ==
After his retirement from football in 1960, Sam served as head coach for the Aba XI team before proceeding to the Nigerian Broadcasting Corporation.

== Honours ==
=== International ===
- Jalco Cup – 1958

== Death ==
Sam died on December 2, 2015, at his residence in Ebonyi State, Nigeria.
