= Heinz Fricke =

German conductor

Heinz Fricke (11 February 1927 – 7 December 2015) was a German conductor. From 1961 to 1992 he held the position of 1. Kapellmeister and later Generalmusikdirektor of the Staatsoper Unter den Linden in Berlin. He also worked at Den Norske Opera. In 2010 Fricke announced his retirement after 18 years with the Washington National Opera and the Kennedy Center Opera House Orchestra (he was appointed to both in 1993). He was the honorary Music Director Emeritus of the WNO and the KCOHO.
