= Enoch Thorsgard =

American politician (1917–2015)

Member of the North Dakota House of Representatives from the 19th district
- In office 1969–1980

Personal details
- Born: March 30, 1917 Northwood, North Dakota
- Died: December 16, 2015 (aged 98) Northwood
- Party: Republican
- Spouse: Madeline
- Profession: farmer, rancher

Enoch Thorsgard (March 30, 1917 – December 16, 2015) was an American politician who was a member of the North Dakota House of Representatives.

He was born on a farm near Northwood, North Dakota. He was the son of Arne Thorsgaard (1874-1948) and Clara (Markve) Thorsgaard (1888-1985). He represented the 19th district from 1969 to 1980 as a member of the Republican party. He was an alumnus of North Dakota Agriculture College and a farmer and cattle rancher near Northwood, North Dakota. He died on December 16, 2015, in Northwood, North Dakota.
