= Ray Price (motorcyclist) =

- Born: June 25, 1937; Johnston County, North Carolina
- Died: December 16, 2015 (aged 78); Raleigh, North Carolina
- Occupation: Motorcycle drag racer
- Years active: 1966–2003
- Known for: "Father of the Funnybike" wheelie bar, two-speed automatic transmission

Ray Price (June 25, 1937 – December 16, 2015) was an American motorcycle drag racer and is credited as the "Father of the Funnybike". He was also a designer, engineer, and the first drag racer to be sponsored by Harley-Davidson. He also developed the first wheelie bar, and the two-speed automatic racing transmission for drag racing motorcycles. This transmission enabled a motorcycle to achieve 200 miles per hour (320 km/h) for the first time, and has now become standard in the sport. Price also created the Pro Fuel drag racing class. Price is an inducted member of five halls of fame including the American Motorcycle Association Hall of Fame, Sturgis Motorcycle Hall of Fame, the North Carolina Sport Hall of Fame, and the North Carolina Drag Racing Hall of Fame.

Price was born on a tobacco farm in Johnston County, North Carolina. He served four years as a radar specialist in aircraft armament control in the United States Air Force. At age 30 he purchased his first motorcycle and began his drag racing career three years later. Price continued his drag racing career through the 2003 All Harley Drag Racing Association season. Through the years Price and his race team amassed numerous wins, records, and championships in AMA ProStar/AMA Dragbike, All Harley Drag Racing Association, and the International Hot Rod Association.

Price opened Precision Cycle in Raleigh, North Carolina in 1973, and in 1981 he acquired the Harley-Davidson franchise and his store became Ray Price Harley-Davidson. Price's dealership is one of the largest in the southeastern United States and is home to the Legends of Harley Drag Racing Museum on the 2nd floor of the dealership overlooking the showroom, the only museum of its kind.

He died on December 16, 2015, aged 78.
