= Portia James =

American curator and historian

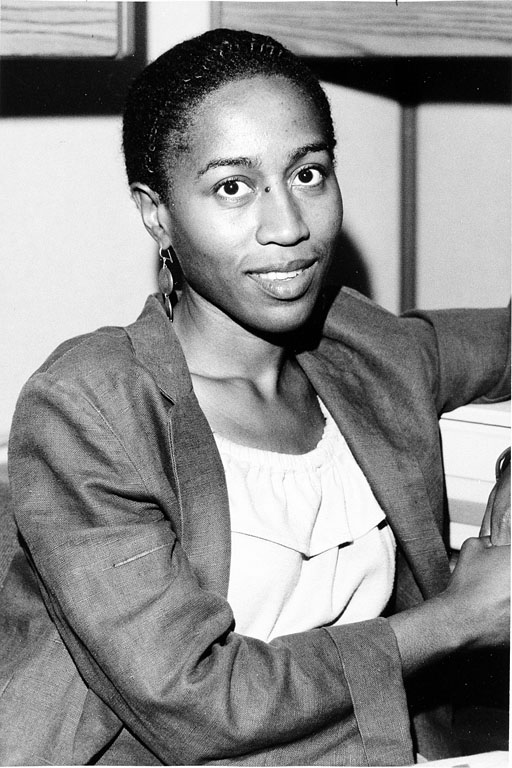
- Portia James, 1985.
- Born: March 11, 1953
- Died: December 2, 2015 (aged 62)
- Occupation: cultural resources manager

Portia James (March 11, 1953 - December 2, 2015) was an American curator and historian. A specialist in African-American material culture, she worked as the cultural resources manager of the Anacostia Community Museum.

== Life ==
James graduated from Wayne State University, and Howard University.

James' exhibition work included The Real McCoy: African American Invention and Innovation, 1619-1930 (1989); Black Mosaic: Community, Race and Ethnicity among Black Immigrants in Washington, DC (1994); Down Through the Years: Stories from the Anacostia Museum Collection (1996); East of the River: Continuity and Change (2007); Jubilee: African American Celebration (2008); Exercise Your Mynd: Bk Adams I AM ART (2012); Arture (2012); Ubuhle Women: Beadwork and the Art of Independence (2013); and Hand of Freedom: The Life and Legacy of the Plummer Family (2015). She researched the life of Leslie J. Payne.

== Selected works ==
- James, Portia. "Building a Community-Based Identity at Anacostia Museum." Curator: The Museum Journal. 39:1 (1996): 19-44.
- James, Portia. The Real McCoy: African-American Invention and Innovations, 1619-1930. Washington: Smithsonian Institution (1990). ISBN 0874745578
- James, Portia. Building Immigrant Community Life in Washington DC: A Public History Approach," Trotter Review, Vol. 10: Iss. 1, Article 4
