= Miles Myers =

American writer and executive

- Born: 1931; Newton, Kansas, United States
- Died: December 15, 2015 (aged 83–84)
- Education: University of California, Berkeley
- Occupations: writer and executive
- Spouse: Celeste (m. 1956)
- Children: 3

Miles Myers (1931–2015) was the leader of the Bay Area Writing Project and former Executive Director of the National Council of Teachers of English (NCTE), and director of the National Writing Project (NWP) in its early years. He was also a teacher union leader, serving as president of the California Federation of Teachers for five years.

== Early years ==
Myers was born in Newton, Kansas on February 4th, 1931. In the 1940s he moved with his family to Pomona, California, and graduated from Pomona High School in 1949. During the Korean War Myers served in Germany.

== Education ==
Myers earned a bachelor's degree, two master's degrees and a PhD in rhetoric and composition from the University of California, Berkeley.

== Career ==
He began writing at a young age. In high school he was an editor of the school newspaper and published stories about his personal travels in the Pomona Progress Bulletin. He taught English in the Oakland Public School system for 17 years, beginning at Washington Union High School in Fremont, California. He was a co-founder and teacher consultant of the Bay Area Writing Project. After serving for many years as senior vice-president of the California Federation of Teachers, he then served for five years (1985-1990) as president. He spent seven years as the Executive Director of the National Council of Teachers of English. During 1997-1999, he served as the Executive Director for the California Subject Matter Project. He was the Chairman of the Curriculum Study Commission of Northern California, and worked as a consultant for the Institute for Research on Teaching and Learning.

== Bay Area Writing Project ==
Myers was among the first cohort of teachers to teach other educators on how to train writing skills. During this time, Myers, with others, conducted three hour workshops with teachers to design teaching methods to help students.

== Research ==
Myers was a scholar with 22 publications under his name. Myers’s main research stems in improving education for K-12 schools. Among his works includes: Changing Our Minds: Negotiating English and Literacy and How to Study Writing in the Classroom. Through his research, he advocates for specific methods to teach children, such as grading writing holistically.

== Boards and commissions ==
He served for 40 years as the Chairman of the Board of Alpha Plus Corporation; 30 years on the CCCTE's Curriculum Study Commission. He was Chair of the Research Foundation of the NCTE and served five years on the Board of the BASRC (Bay Area School Reform School in Fremont, California.

== Personal life and death ==
Myers was generally passionate about life. Following a heart bypass, Myers joined an aerobics class. Cheered on from his mostly female classmates, Myers happily attended these classes for ten years. Additionally, Myers faced adversity when he served as a teacher consultant to teach other writing instructors, who weren’t pleased with his teachings.

Myers died at the age of 84 on December 15, 2015 in Oakland, from complications of heart disease. He was married to Celeste for 59 years, and had three children, Royce, Brant and Roz. He had three sisters, Jean McClard, Joan Hope Cecil and Patty Gatlin Dennis. He had six grandchildren and one-great grandchild.
