= Joe Lancaster (football trainer) =

Joe Lancaster (4 December 1926 – 14 December 2015) was an English football trainer and celebrated sports journalist.

A fitness-minded individual, Lancaster continued to focus on sporting endeavours after retiring from his professional football career, training in long-distance running. He broke several world records for endurance and speed in 1954 and 1955 and narrowly missed out on competing for his country in the Olympic Games. However, his training regimen lowered his immune system enough to produce an onset of tuberculosis, which forced him into an isolation clinic, and when he resumed running again after recovery, he chose to start training others rather than focusing on his own performances.

Opting to pursue a career as a trainer, Lancaster variously worked for both the great footballing rivals Manchester City and his former club, Manchester United. He notably formulated the fitness regime of Manchester City's successful team of the 1960s and 70s. While his strict training schedule was initially unpopular, it would eventually come to be recognised by their players as the chief cause of their incredible fitness, leading them to a number of trophies. Following his retirement from sports training he moved into journalism, setting up a sports news agency for which he freelanced for a variety of local and national publications, in which capacity he travelled around the world including to report on five Olympic Games.
