= Alfred C. Snider =

- Born: Alfred Charles Snider III; October 28, 1950; Pasadena, California, U.S.
- Died: December 11, 2015 (aged 65); Burlington, Vermont, U.S.
- Education: Brown University (Bachelor's); Emerson College (Master's); University of Kansas (Ph.D.)

Dr. Alfred Charles "Tuna" Snider III (October 28, 1950 – December 11, 2015) was the Edwin W. Lawrence Professor of Forensics at the University of Vermont from 1982 until his death in late 2015.

A native of the greater Los Angeles area in southern California, he graduated from West Covina High School and moved to New England after his graduation from high school to obtain a bachelor's degree from Brown University in Providence, Rhode Island, where he majored in Asian civilizations with a minor in speech communication. He later received a master's degree from Emerson College and a Ph.D. from the University of Kansas, specializing in rhetoric and speech communication.

While a professor at the University of Vermont (UVM), he coached the Lawrence Debate Union and taught rhetoric, argument, and persuasion.
