= Dermot O'Mahony (bishop) =

Dermot Patrick O'Mahony (18 February 1935 – 10 December 2015) was a Roman Catholic bishop.

Born in Enniskillen, Northern Ireland, O'Mahoney was ordained to the priesthood on 29 May 1960. On 13 February 1975, O'Mahony was appointed titular bishop of Thiava and auxiliary bishop of the Roman Catholic Archdiocese of Dublin and was ordained bishop on 13 April 1975. He studied for the priesthood at Clonliffe College, and spent 4 years at the Pontifical University of Rome. He was Professor at Clonliffe College.

He was Chairman of the Irish Bishops' Commission for Justice and Peace and tried to find a resolution of the 1981 Hunger Strikes, in the Maze Prison.

On 7 June 1996, O'Mahony resigned.
