= George Andreadis =

Greek novelist

George Andreadis (Greek: Γιώργος Ανδρεάδης; 1936 – December 30, 2015) was a Greek novelist of Pontic Greek descent. He was born in the refugee quarters of Kalamaria on the outskirts of Thessaloniki. His family had originally migrated to Batumi where his father Kyriakos had been a member of the Pontus National Assembly. The family moved to Greece in 1930.

Andreadis studied at Anatolia College in Thessaloniki on a scholarship, and then studied Political Economy at Freiburg University in Germany. He has visited the Black Sea region of Turkey numerous times and has written extensively about its culture and history, in particular the history of the Pontic Greeks deported in the 1920s.

He is best known for his novel Tamama which was made into a film called Waiting for the Clouds by Turkish director Yeşim Ustaoğlu. His other works include The Brazier of Memory and The Crypto-Christians.

He died in December 2015.
