= Tony Carroll (psychotherapist) =

American psychotherapist (1941–2015)

Tony Carroll, LCSW (September 11, 1941 – December 29, 2015) was an American psychotherapist. He established a psychotherapy practice in the Neartown area of Houston, Texas, in 1983, making it the oldest LGBT psychotherapy practice in the city. Carroll served as the first openly gay president of the Texas Society for Clinical Social Work, and conducted one of the first studies on the stability of gay couples, though his research was never published. He practiced psychotherapy in Neartown in the same building as his spouse, Bruce W. Smith, DDS.

== Early life ==
Carroll was raised in a small town in Arkansas by a religious family, and later studied music at Hendrix College, where he began to question his sexuality. He discovered the book The Sixth Man by Jess Stearn, which suggested to Carroll that communities of productive gay people actually existed, causing him to question the prevailing attitudes about homosexual people. During his junior year of undergraduate school, he was engaged to a female vocalist in a trio, for which he was the keyboardist. However, she broke off their engagement because she believed he was in love with the third member of the trio, a male vocalist, rather than her. This became Carroll's first gay relationship, and it lasted eight years, despite great opposition from the parents on both sides.

In August 1968, Carroll took a choral department job in Houston and settled in the Neartown area of Houston. He later decided to abandon music in favor of pursuing a degree in social work, so he began to research long-term gay couples in graduate school at the University of Houston. He described the motivating force behind this decision as deriving from his "20 years in the chair" himself: he had difficulties finding therapists willing to work with a gay patient and later, gay couples, so he decided to help the gay community through this venue.

== Career ==
Carroll was a Licensed Clinical Social Worker (LSCW), and ran his own practice from the 1980s onwards. He was also a certified Imago relationship therapist, although he did not practice the teachings of this theory. His psychotherapy practice was latterly devoted to adults in both individual and couples, so although he had a particular interest in working with LGBT individuals and couples, his practice also included a large number of heterosexual clients. He treated many people with concerns about anxiety, depression, mood disturbances, intimacy, relationships, grief and loss, mid-life, sexuality, self-esteem, growth, and couples' issues. Carroll was voted Best Mental Health Therapist for the years 2003-2009 by Houston's OutSmart magazine. He co-founded the Psychotherapy Resource Group, a training group for mental health professionals. He also taught the medical staff of several hospitals and organizations in how to deal with emotional crises in the hospital. He was the first openly gay president of Texas Society for Clinical Social Work, and a diplomat of the International Congress for the Advancement of Private Practice.

Carroll was active not only as a therapist, but also for Houston's LGBT community. He said that "most gay people know very early on that they are different and that they need to hide those differences. Remaining closeted and hiding the truth from the world becomes self defeating behavior, and invisibility makes it easier to perpetuate myths about gay people". He thus worked with the gay community to help them learn to accept themselves for who they are through his therapy sessions.

In 1983, Carroll conducted a study on stability in gay relationships, one of the first in America at the time. AIDS became a topic of national concern in the early 1980s, creating social stigma against anyone who identified with the gay community. By sending out an advert through the magazine This Week in Texas, he found forty homosexual couples from Houston who had been together a minimum of six years. Though he never published his research, it showed that homosexual relationships were just as stable as heterosexual relationships, despite the stereotype that homosexuals cannot have stable relationships. He also studied the level of integration of gay couples in the wider community, and found that these well-established couples tended not to interact with the inner-city bar scene, but instead referred to their heterosexual neighbors as their closest friends.

== Personal life and death ==
Carroll first met Dr. Bruce W. Smith, a Houston-area dentist, at a Log Cabin Republican Convention in 1995. In 2003, they were married in Toronto, Ontario, Canada. Carroll has said that although the marriage was not valid in the United States, he and his husband felt it was important to them to have their marriage recognized, and that it was an "amazing" and "emotional" experience. Carroll believed that religion's stronghold on America's politics and society was the main reason the US had not granted homosexuals the right to marry, while Canada and other countries had. He did believe, however, that the US would legalize gay marriage, and that society was infinitely more accepting of gays now than it had been.

Carroll and Smith continually presented themselves as a publicly gay couple because they believed that it provided a role model for others in the gay community. They claimed that their image as a professional gay couple was one of their greatest accomplishments in Houston's gay community. Their friends affectionately called them "Dental and Mental", because their practices were located in the same building.

Carroll died in New York City on December 29, 2015, at the age of 74.

== See also ==
- LGBT rights in Texas
