= Brian Keeble (footballer) =

English footballer

Personal information
- Date of birth: 11 July 1938
- Place of birth: Holbeach, England
- Date of death: 16 December 2015 (aged 77)
- Place of death: Cleethorpes, England
- Position: Full back

Senior career*
| Years | Team | Apps | (Gls) |
- Holbeach United
| 1959–1965 | Grimsby Town | 172 | (1) |
| 1965–1969 | Darlington | 154 | (2) |
| 1969–1971 | Boston United | | |
- Brigg Town
- Barton Town
- * Club domestic league appearances and goals

Brian Keeble (11 July 1938 – 16 December 2015) was an English footballer who made 326 appearances in the Football League playing as a full back for Grimsby Town and Darlington in the 1960s. He also played non-league football in the Lincolnshire area.

== Playing career ==
Keeble began his football career with his hometown club, Holbeach United. While doing his National Service in the Royal Lincolnshire Regiment, he played for Football League club Grimsby Town's reserve team as an amateur, and turned professional as soon as he left the Army in 1959. He made his League debut against York City in the following September, and went on to establish himself in the starting eleven. He was ever-present as Grimsby were promoted as Third Division runners-up in 1961–62, and scored once that season – the only goal of his Grimsby career – in a 3–2 win at home to Northampton Town in March 1962. According to Keeble, interviewed in 2011, he "was about 50 yards (46 m) out and hit the ball towards goal. Ron Rafferty went up with the 'keeper and they both missed the ball and it went flying into the net."

Earlier that same season, Keeble was the victim of a bizarre occurrence when playing away to Watford, whose Vicarage Road ground had been constructed on the site of an old gravel pit and was prone to subsidence. A hole opened up on the pitch under his feet, expanding to 2 feet (0.61 m) wide and twice as deep, and the referee suspended play for 14 minutes while the hole was filled in.

He played much less frequently at the higher level, making only 49 appearances, which took his total to 172 (181 in all senior competitions), and was released at the end of the 1954–65 season. He moved on to Fourth Division club Darlington, went straight into the starting eleven and was ever-present as they were promoted to the second tier in his first season. He played 154 times for Darlington in the League, and scored twice. One of those two goals, against Walsall, was scored from even further out than his Grimsby goal: he "hit the ball forward, the goalkeeper came out to claim it and slipped on his backside and it trickled into the goal." He made 154 league appearances in four seasons with Darlington, and went on to play non-league football for clubs including Boston United, Brigg Town and Barton Town.

== Style of play ==
Keeble began his career as a centre half, but soon switched to full back. Although right-footed, he was used most often at left back. He described himself as "[not] one of those players who go in for big tackles", preferring to manoeuvre his opponent positionally, and went through his whole professional career without being booked.

== Personal life ==
Keeble was born in Holbeach, Lincolnshire. He married wife Diane in 1963. After his football career finished, he worked in a supervisory role for transportation companies in the Grimsby area. Keeble died at home in Cleethorpes, Lincolnshire, after a short illness, at the age of 77.
