= Donald Weinstein =

American historian (1926–2015)

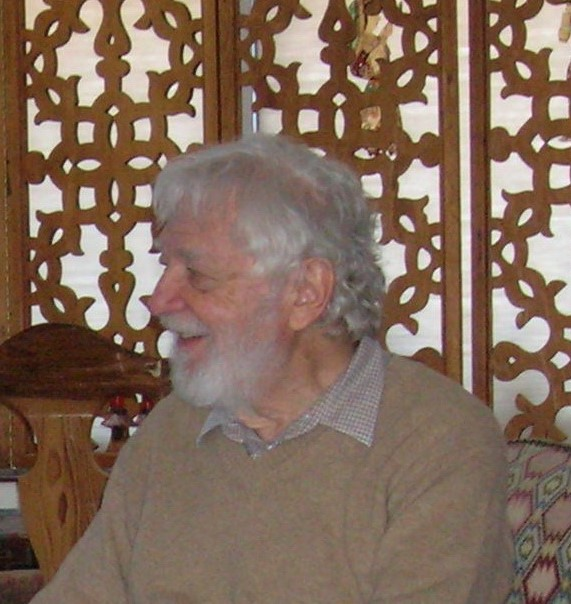
- Donald Weinstein in Sonoita (Arizona) in 2009
- Born: March 13, 1926; Rochester, New York
- Died: December 13, 2015 (aged 89); Tucson, Arizona
- Occupation: Historian

Donald Weinstein (March 13, 1926 – December 13, 2015) was a leading American historian of the Italian Renaissance.

== Life ==
He was born in Rochester, New York. He studied at Denison College. From 1944 he served in the Army in World War II, after which he was awarded a Bronze Star for heroic achievement. In 1950 he graduated from the University of Chicago and later he was a Fulbright scholar at the University of Florence and fellow in prestigious research institutes in USA and Italy. He took his PhD in 1957 at the University of Iowa with a dissertation on the Italian preacher Girolamo Savonarola. Among his masters were some of the most distinguished historians of the time: Delio Cantimori, Eugenio Garin and George Mosse. He taught history at Roosevelt University in Chicago and Rutgers University in New Jersey. In 1978 he moved to the University of Arizona, from which he retired in 1992.

He combined his academic job with political passion and community service, and when retired he was a volunteer for the Sonoita fire emergency office, in Arizona.

== Work ==
His research was primarily dedicated to the study of Italian Renaissance history. His most accomplished studies were devoted to the Italian Dominican preacher Girolamo Savonarola and to fifteenth-century Florence. In 1970, his ground-breaking monograph “Savonarola and Florence: Prophecy and Patriotism in the Renaissance” radically changed the traditional approach to the study of Savonarola and his historical context. Not only did Weinstein show that Savonarola adapted his prophetic message to the changing Florentine historical context in which he lived, but he also demonstrated that his religious approach to politics was perfectly coherent (and not in contrast) with Renaissance culture. His book was described as "the best book on Savonarola ever written in any language".

After other works on various topics of religious and political Italian history of the fifteenth and the sixteenth century, in 2011 he returned to Savonarola with an important biography entitled “Savonarola: The Rise and Fall of a Renaissance Prophet”. This book incorporated the outcomes of the many publications which had appeared in the previous decades and went well beyond the traditional hagiographic or biased approaches of nineteenth- and twentieth-century biographies. Weinstein said in an interview that in that book he wanted to share two historical lessons he had learned: "one, the inadequacy of historical labels such as “medieval” and “modern,” and the limitation of moral judgments—such as “saint,” “fanatic,” “charlatan,” and “demagogue”" and "two, the complex psychological, social, political and ideological reasons behind peoples’ belief in and rejection of their heroes and leaders."

In 2016 he received the Helen & Howard R. Marraro Prize, awarded by the American Historical Association, for the book “The Duke’s Assassin” by Stefano Dall’Aglio, which he translated from the Italian.

== Books ==
- Ambassador from Venice: Pietro Pasqualigo in Lisbon 1501. Minneapolis: University of Minnesota Press. 1960.
- The Renaissance and the Reformation. New York: Free Press. 1965. (editor)
- Savonarola and Florence: Prophecy and Patriotism in the Renaissance. Princeton: Princeton University Press. 1970. ISBN 978-0-691-05184-0.
- Saints and Society: The Two Worlds of Western Christendom, 1000-1700. Chicago: University of Chicago Press. 1982. ISBN 978-0-226-89057-9. (co-editor with Rudolph Bell)
- The Captain's Concubine. Love, Honor and Violence in Renaissance Pistoia. Baltimore: Johns Hopkins University Press. 2000. ISBN 978-0-801-86475-9.
- Heiko A. Oberman (2003). The Two Reformations. The Journey from the Last Days to the New World. New Haven and London: Yale University Press. ISBN 978-0-300-09868-6. (editor)
- Savonarola: The Rise and Fall of a Renaissance Prophet. New Haven and London: Yale University Press. 2011. ISBN 978-0-300-11193-4.
- Stefano Dall'Aglio (2015). The Duke's Assassin. Life and Death of Lorenzino de' Medici. New Haven and London: Yale University Press. ISBN 978-0-300-18978-0. (translator)
