= Phil Oestricher =

American test pilot

Philip F. Oestricher
- Born: 1931
- Died: December 18, 2015 (aged 84); Fort Worth, Texas, United States
- Military career
- Branch: United States Marine Corps

Philip F. Oestricher (1931 – December 18, 2015) was an American aerodynamics engineer and test pilot. He made both the unscheduled first flight of the General Dynamics F-16 Fighting Falcon on January 20, 1974 and its official first flight on February 2, 1974.

== Career ==
Oestricher worked at Consolidated Vultee as an aerodynamics engineer on the B-36 bomber. He later served in the United States Marine Corps, where he flew the F4D Skyray. As a test pilot, Oestricher flew all models of the F-111 fighter-bomber.

On January 20, 1974, Oestricher piloted the unscheduled first flight of the General Dynamics F-16 Fighting Falcon at Edwards Air Force Base, California. While performing high-speed ground tests, Oestricher nearly lost control of the aircraft when it entered a series of roll oscillations. Oestricher elected to take the craft airborne to avoid crashing and remained in flight for six minutes. Oestricher also piloted the F-16's official first flight on February 2, 1974. He contributed to the development of multiple versions of the F-16 and established F-16 safety protocols.

=== Death ===
Oestricher died in Fort Worth, Texas, on December 18, 2015, at the age of 84.
