= Florentino Broce =

Filipino footballer (died 2015)

Personal information
- Date of birth: c. 1943
- Date of death: 18 December 2015 (aged 72)
- Place of death: Bacolod, Philippines
- Position: Winger

International career
Years	Team	Apps	(Gls)
- Philippines

Managerial career
- 1973–1974: Philippines

Florentino L. Broce, nicknamed Ponti Broce, (c. 1943 – 18 December 2015) was a Filipino football player and coach. A winger, he played for the Philippines national team. He was head coach of the national team from 1973 to 1974.

Broce graduated grade school from the University of Saint La Salle (Bacolod City) and then attended De La Salle University for his high school and college studies. He graduated from high school in 1962 and attained (LIA-COM) Bachelor of Science in Business Administration in 1967. Broce went on to pursue further studies in Universidad Central de Madrid from 1969 to 1972. He was inducted into the Sports Hall of Fame by De La Salle in 1997. He was also awarded at the first Negros Occidental Football Night held on 6 June 2006 along with other Negrense players.

Broce died on 18 December 2015 at the age of 72.
