= Anthony Muto (fashion designer) =

American fashion designer (1934–2015)

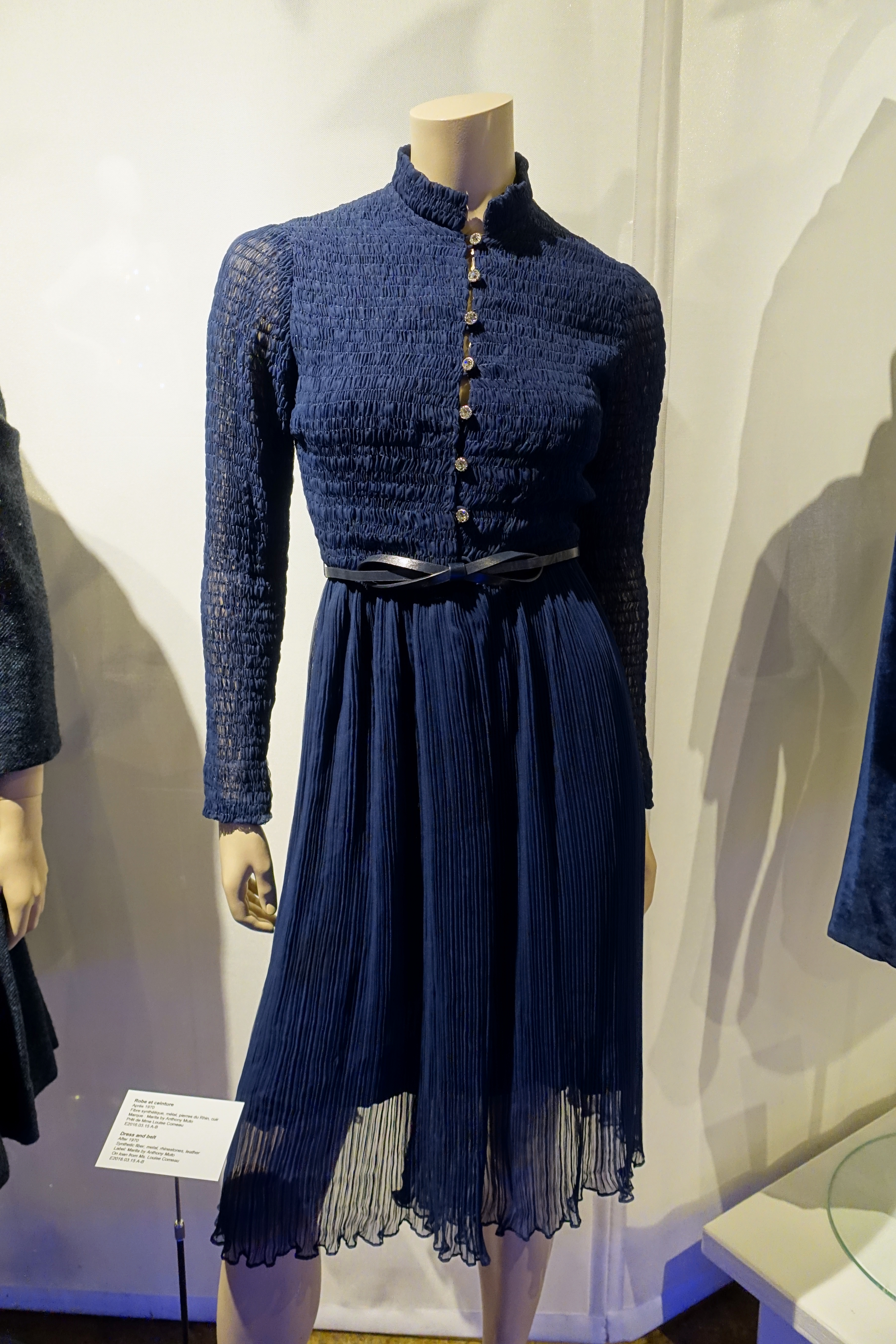
Dress and belt designed by Anthony Muto

Anthony Louis Muto (June 21, 1934 – December 16, 2015) was an American fashion designer, who dressed three American First Ladies: Lady Bird Johnson, Rosalynn Carter and Barbara Bush.

Muto had his own labels, Marita by Anthony Muto and A.M./P.M., and designed for others including Joan Raines, Saz, and Jobère.
