= Bets Borm-Luijkx =

Dutch politician (1918–2015)

Member of the House of Representatives
- In office 6 May 1980 – 10 June 1981

Member of the States of Overijssel
- In office 5 June 1974 – 1 January 1986

Personal details
- Born: 22 October 1918 Etten-Leur, Netherlands
- Died: 19 December 2015 (aged 97) Emmeloord, Netherlands
- Party: Catholic People's Party (until 1980), Christian Democratic Appeal (from 1980)

Elisabeth Maria Wilhelmina "Bets" Borm-Luijkx (22 October 1918 – 19 December 2015) was a Dutch politician, who served as member of the House of Representatives between 1980 and 1981 for the Christian Democratic Appeal. On the provincial level she served in the States of Overijssel from 1974 to 1986.

== Career ==
Luijkx was born on 22 October 1918 in Etten-Leur. She followed her MULO education until 1936 and subsequently agricultural family and consumer science until 1939. Of the latter she became a teacher herself. In 1948 she married and took the name Borm-Luijkx.

Borm-Luijkx was a member of the States of Overijssel for the Catholic People's Party between 5 June 1974 and 1 January 1986. Her party merged into the Christian Democratic Appeal (CDA) in 1980. As a member of the CDA she was member of the House of Representatives between 6 May 1980 and 10 June 1981. Apart from her political career she served as President of the Catholic Female Farmer Association.

Borm-Luijkx was invested as a Knight of the Order of Orange-Nassau on 27 April 1984. She died on 19 December 2015 in Emmeloord, aged 97.
