= Dennis Griffiths =

British journalist and historian

Dennis Griffiths (8 December 1933 – 24 December 2015) was a British journalist and historian, regarded as the founding father of newspaper history from the earliest days of Fleet Street. His Encyclopedia of the British Press 1422–1992 has become a standard work of reference for the whole industry. Born in Swansea, the son of a compositor, he trained as a printer himself, rose to become the production chief of the London Evening Standard for 18 years and wrote six books, including a definitive history of that newspaper from its launch in 1827, much praised in the foreword by its former owner the late Vere Harmsworth.

From 1999 to 2002 Griffiths was an energetic chairman of the London Press Club. In March 2002, he helped organise the 300th anniversary celebration for the first regular daily newspaper to be printed in the United Kingdom. The Prince of Wales unveiled a brass plaque at a service in St Bride’s, the journalists’ church, on the date The Daily Courant was first published in Fleet Street.

In 2006 the British Library published his book Fleet Street – Five Hundred Years of the Press to coincide with an exhibition of newspaper front pages which he co-curated. He also helped prepare an oral archive of newspaper history, and that year was himself interviewed by National Life Stories (C638/06) for the 'Oral History of the British Press' collection held by the library. In 2013 he founded the Coranto Press which published scholarly works on the media.

Griffiths often retold the story of how in 1969 the Evening Standard pre-printed front pages showing a facsimile colour picture of Neil Armstrong being the first man to step onto the moon – 24 hours ahead of actually landing.

== Publications ==
- The Encyclopedia of the British Press 1422–1992, London and Basingstoke: Macmillan, 1992. ISBN 0-333-52984-7.
- Fleet Street – Five Hundred Years of the Press, British Library Publishing, 2006. ASIN: B00EKYHS2U.
