= Walter Fawcett =

Irish cricketer

Personal information
- Born: 6 August 1929; Ardglass, County Down, Northern Ireland
- Died: 10 December 2015 (aged 86); Bangor, County Down, Northern Ireland
- Batting: Right-handed

International information
- National side: Ireland

Career statistics
Competition	First-class
Matches	6
Runs scored	56
Batting average	8.00
100s/50s	0/0
Top score	21
Catches/stumpings	8/4
- Source: CricketArchive, 15 November 2022

George Walter Fawcett (6 August 1929 – 10 December 2015) was a cricketer from Northern Ireland.

A right-handed batsman and wicket-keeper, he made his debut for Ireland against Scotland in June 1956 in a first-class match. He went on to play for Ireland on twelve occasions, his last match also coming against Scotland in June 1959.

Of his matches for Ireland, six had first-class status. In all matches for Ireland, he scored 87 runs at an average of 6.21, with a top score of 21 against Scotland in his debut match. As a wicket-keeper, he took twelve catches and six stumpings.
