= Zoltán Szabó (surgeon) =

Hungarian heart surgeon, cardiologist

Zoltán Szabó (23 October 1929 – 6 December 2015) was a Hungarian heart surgeon, cardiologist, and professor emeritus of the Városmajor Heart and Vascular Centre. Szabo served as the Director of the Városmajor Heart and Vascular Centre from 1981 until 1992. In January 1992, he performed Hungary's first successful heart transplant following years of research.

Szabó retired from the Városmajor Heart and Vascular Centre on 1 July 1992. He then served as the director of Biotronik Hungária Kft from 1992 until 2004. He was also a professor emeritus at Semmelweis University from 1995 until his death in 2015.

He was awarded the Széchenyi Award in 1997. Szabó was also the recipient of the Order of Merit of the Republic of Hungary Commander's Cross, as well as the Batthyány-Strattmann László Award.

Zoltán Szabó died in Budapest following a long illness on 6 December 2015, at the age of 86.
