= Daniel J. Dinan =

American judge (1929–2015)

Daniel James Dinan (March 21, 1929 – December 22, 2015) was a Special Trial Judge of the United States Tax Court.

== Life and career ==
Born in Connecticut on March 21, 1929, Daniel James Dinan attended parochial elementary school and public high school. He received a B.S.S. in History from Fairfield University in 1952, and an LL.B. from the Georgetown University Law Center in 1960. After serving in the United States Marine Corps, he was admitted to the Virginia Bar in 1961. From 1961 to 1979, he worked in the tax division of the United States Department of Justice, serving as Assistant Chief of the Civil Trial Section of that department from 1970 to 1979. From 1977 to 1979, he also taught trial practice and techniques, evidence and civil procedure in Attorney General's Advocacy Institute. Dinan was appointed to be a Special Trial Judge for the United States Tax Court on February 4, 1979. He died on December 22, 2015, at the age of 86.

== Sources ==
- U.S. Tax Court biography of Daniel J. Dinan
