= Edward Hugh =

- Born: Edward Hugh Bengree-Jones; 29 December 1948; Liverpool, England
- Died: 29 December 2015 (aged 67); Girona, Spain

Academic background
- Education: London School of Economics

Academic work
- School or tradition: Demographic economics

Edward Hugh (29 December 1948 – 29 December 2015) was a Welsh economist, dubbed by The New York Times, "the blog prophet of Euro zone doom", he who "attracted a cult following among financial analysts". From 1990 he lived in Catalonia, Spain. He spoke French, Catalan, Spanish and English.

He was born Edward Hugh Bengree-Jones in Liverpool, and studied at the London School of Economics, but was drawn more to philosophy, science, sociology and literature. His eclectic intellectual pursuits not only kept him from getting a doctorate, but also prevented him from gaining a full-time professorship.

By inclination a macroeconomist, his obsession with trying to understand the economic impact of demographic changes often took him far from economics and towards such fields as demography, anthropology, biology, sociology and systems theory. In particular, his work was centred on the study of demographic changes and migration patterns, and their impact on economic growth.

In 2014 he published his first book, "¿Adiós a la Crisis?", which discusses the economic situation in Spain. He worked on a book with the provisional working title "Population, the Ultimate Non-renewable Resource". Apart from his participation in A Fistful of Euros and his own personal blog, Hugh also wrote regularly for the demography blog Demography Matters. He contributed to the Catalan newspaper Ara and Business Insider.

Edward Hugh died on 29 December 2015 of gallbladder and liver cancer.
