= Gabriel Tambon =

French politician

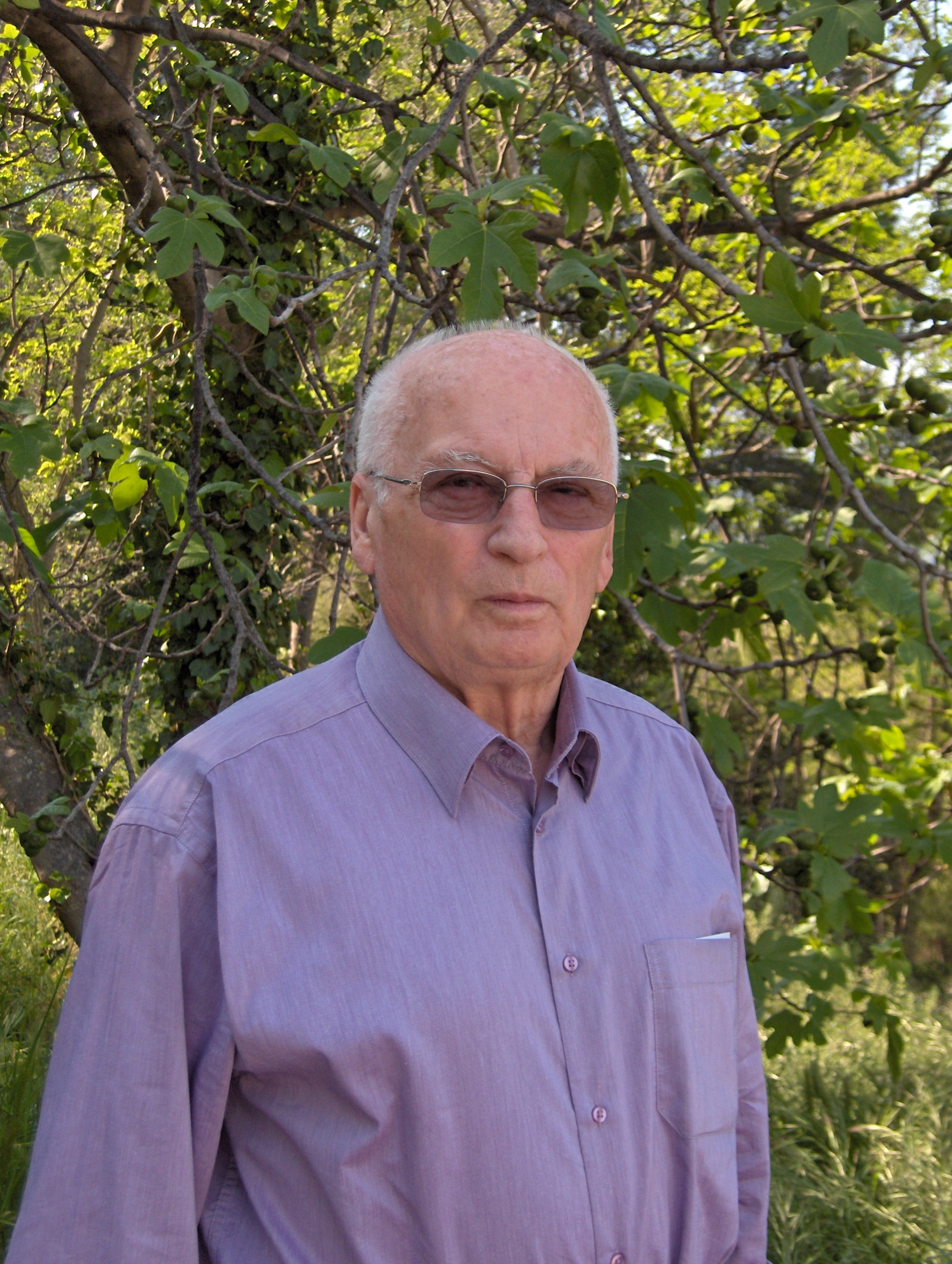
Tambon in July 2007.

Gabriel Tambon (23 March 1930 – 27 December 2015) was a French politician for the Union for a Popular Movement (UMP). He served as the mayor of Le Castellet, Var from 1965 until his death. He was born in Castellet, Vaucluse.
