= Acylcarnitine hydrolase =

Class of enzymes

acylcarnitine hydrolase

Identifiers
- EC no.: 3.1.1.28
- CAS no.: 37278-42-5

Databases
- IntEnz: IntEnz view
- BRENDA: BRENDA entry
- ExPASy: NiceZyme view
- KEGG: KEGG entry
- MetaCyc: metabolic pathway
- PRIAM: profile
- PDB structures: RCSB PDB PDBe PDBsum
- Gene Ontology: AmiGO / QuickGO
Search
- PMC: articles
- PubMed: articles
- NCBI: proteins

The enzyme acylcarnitine hydrolase (EC 3.1.1.28) catalyzes the reaction

O-acylcarnitine + H_{2}O $\rightleftharpoons$ a fatty acid + L-carnitine

This enzyme belongs to the family of hydrolases, specifically those acting on carboxylic ester bonds. The systematic name is O-acylcarnitine acylhydrolase. Other names in common use include high activity acylcarnitine hydrolase, HACH, carnitine ester hydrolase, palmitoylcarnitine hydrolase, palmitoyl-L-carnitine hydrolase, long-chain acyl-L-carnitine hydrolase, and palmitoyl carnitine hydrolase.
