= Frank B. Salisbury =

American plant physiologist

Frank Boyer Salisbury (August 3, 1926 – December 26, 2015) was an American plant physiologist who served for a time as head of the Utah State University (USU) department of plant science.

== Career ==
Salisbury held a B.S. and M.A. from the University of Utah. He received his Ph.D. from the California Institute of Technology. He taught for eleven years as a professor at Colorado State University before joining the faculty of USU.

Salisbury wrote the best-selling textbook Plant Physiology with Cleon W. Ross and edited Geochemistry and the Biosphere with V. I. Vernadskii.

== Creationism ==
A member of the Church of Jesus Christ of Latter-day Saints, Salisbury endorsed creationist arguments in his book The Creation (1976). He criticized natural selection and the modern evolutionary synthesis in Nature and The American Biology Teacher.

In 2006, Salisbury wrote that the "case for evolution is so strong that many aspects are now well established, but it is shortsighted to imply that all the problems have been solved", he also wrote in regard to his 1976 book that he "would take a much less favorable view of the creationist literature than I did then, but I would still point out some problems."

His last book was entitled Case for Divine Design, 2006.

== Publications ==
Books

- The Flowering Process (1963)
- Truth By Reason and By Revelation (1965)
- Vascular Plants, Form and Function (1970) [with Robert V. Parke]
- The Biology of Flowering (1971)
- Botany: An Ecological Approach (1972) [with William A. Jensen]
- Plant Physiology (1974) [with Cleon W. Ross]
- The Utah UFO Display: A Biologist's Report (1974)
- The Creation (1976)
- The Case for Divine Design (2006)

Papers

- Salisbury, Frank B. (1971). Doubts About the Modern Synthetic Theory of Evolution. The American Biology Teacher 33: 335-338
- Salisbury, Frank B. (1967). The Scientist and the UFO. BioScience 17: 15–24.
- Salisbury, Frank B. (1969). Natural Selection and the Complexity of the Gene. Nature 224: 342–343.
