= Ablie Jagne =

Gambian footballer

Personal information
- Date of death: 23 December 2015 (aged 62)
- Position: Defender

Senior career*
Years	Team	Apps	(Gls)
- Real de Banjul

International career
- Gambia
- * Club domestic league appearances and goals

Ablie Jagne (died 23 December 2015) was a Gambian footballer who played for Real de Banjul and the Gambia national team as a defender.
