= Phila Hach =

American Chef

Phila Hach — pronounced "File-ah Hah" (née Rawlings, June 13, 1926 – December 2, 2015) was an American chef, restaurant owner, innkeeper, and caterer who authored 17 cookbooks, including recipe collections for the 1982 World's Fair, Opryland USA and Cracker Barrel restaurants. She has been called the "grand dame of southern cooking" and counted as good friends Duncan Hines and Julia Child. Hach catered functions for the United Nations, U.S. mayors and governors, military personnel and celebrities, and was one of the pastry chefs at the wedding of Princess Diana.

As a young flight attendant on international routes, she talked her way into the kitchens of top hotels in Europe on flight layovers, and was convincing enough to gain access to established chefs, in order to learn how haute cuisine kitchens operated. She hosted the first televised cooking show in the southern U.S., which ran on WSM-TV in Nashville from 1950 to 1956, and which won her a Zenith television award.

Hach won the Food Arts Magazine "Silver Spoon Award" in 2009 and was the 2015 winner of the Ruth Fertel "Keeper of the Flame Award", given yearly by the Southern Foodways Alliance to the "unsung hero or heroine who has made a great contribution to food". Hach was keynote speaker at large conventions including the Culinary Institute of America. Southern food writer Betty Fussell said of Phila Hach, "What the 'Grand Ole Opry' did for country music, she has done for Southern food..."

== Early life ==
Hach was born in Nashville, the child of innkeepers Sophia and Arthur Lee Rawlings. Her mother, who was Swiss, also worked as a home demonstration agent for the U.S. Government during the great depression. Her job was to provide hot lunches to local schools. As a teen, Hach spent the summers of 1942-44 learning from a Hungarian chef at a summer resort, the former Lookout Mountain Hotel in Chattanooga. Hach stated, "He taught me not to waste anything, and to start with fabulous ingredients. Nothing is better than what it starts out to be". She earned a degree in music from Ward-Belmont College in Nashville, and also a bachelor's degree in foods and nutrition in 1949 from Vanderbilt University.

In her twenties, she became a flight attendant for American Airlines and Pan Am and flew international routes. In the late 1940s, that was considered a glamorous job for young women who were screened for attributes of youth, attractiveness, proper height and weight, and single marital status. The airlines depended on them and treated them well. On her flight layovers she was able to stay at fine hotels in Europe.

Hach visited the kitchens of hotels such as the Savoy Hotel in London and the Georges V in Paris. She would ask their chefs to let her cook with them. Her success in gaining such access allowed her to learn techniques that gave her cooking a "worldly touch". Combining her airline experience with love of cooking, she developed one of the first in-flight catering manuals for the airline industry. As of 2009, Hach's in-flight catering business was still preparing 30,000 meals a year for military planes flying out of Ft. Campbell, Kentucky. She said, "When I started in the food business with the airlines, there were no women. It was a man's world."

== Television show ==
When television arrived in Nashville in 1950, the newly created WSM Television Channel 4 needed programming. Within their first few months on the air, the station hired Hach to create a culinary show—making her the first woman to host a television show in the southern U.S. The program Hach headed was called "Kitchen Kollege".

In planning the 30-minute program, she chose as her assistant Martha Mormon, who she called "Miss Martha". Mormon was an African-American woman from Detroit who had previously worked as a maid at the television station and was the first black woman to appear on television in the southern U.S. The pair staged the show each weekday for the next five years. During this time, Hach continued working as a flight attendant on weekends. The show was popular with viewers, who reportedly loved the inevitable gaffes and surprises typical of live television of the day. Guests on the show included Roy Acuff, Minnie Pearl, June Carter Cash, and Duncan Hines.

== Success ==
During one of her Paris flight layovers, a young tobacco exporter visiting from the United States saw Phila and offered to help her with her luggage. He was a wealthy Sorbonne-educated businessman named Adolph Hach, Jr. Two years after he returned to his home in Clarksville, Tennessee, he happened to see her again, this time on television doing her cooking show. After writing to her, they met, a romance was sparked, and they were ultimately married in Clarksville in October, 1955. The wedding was a grand affair with a reception for 1,000 guests.

Hach described her husband as a "darling, fabulous man who spoke five languages". He asked her to quit television and to give up flying; she asked him to sell his tobacco business. After each agreed, they began a year-long honeymoon, traveling all over the world before settling in Tennessee to build their dream: an inn modeled on the European style. It was first called "Hachland Hall Bed and Breakfast" (pronounced "holland"), and was located on Madison Street in Clarksville, Tennessee near Nashville. Soon after opening, they added lunch and dinner service and it became an inn in 1963.

The Hachs later added Hachland Hill Vineyard on a 90-acre site in nearby Joelton, Tennessee for corporate retreats. They also developed the Spring Creek Inn, which adjoined the vineyard. In 2005 they sold the original Hachland Hall in Clarksville, and created a new version, "Hachland Hill" on the Joelton site, creating a venue which could, as of 2009, serve 1,500 guests.

Hach made herself available for talk shows, newspaper feature articles, and public speaking engagements. With a young son at home, she did a radio show broadcast from her kitchen. She developed relationships with political leaders and celebrities, and her tables began to include the likes of Oprah Winfrey and Henry Kissinger. Hach said, "We get more business people for security reasons...small inns and bed and breakfasts are where people get back to earth, where they have a home experience".

== Anecdotes ==
In 1976, the Governor of Tennessee and the Mayor of Nashville invited 1600 dignitaries of the United Nations – including over 100 permanent U.N. members – to come to Tennessee for a visit honoring Secretary Kurt Waldheim. A commemorative marker of the event now stands at the site. Tennessee Senator Howard Baker chose Hach to cater the affair, and she decided that mint juleps should be served; however, alcohol was prohibited at the site of the festivities, Nashville's Centennial Park. Hach arranged for Tennessee State Troopers to transport disguised cases of Jack Daniel's whiskey from Lynchburg and, under the cloak of darkness, made the juleps at a nearby Coca-Cola bottling plant. During the visit, Hach gave her cookbooks to each of the delegates. In return, she asked them to send her their favorite local recipes. They responded with letters and recipes from around the world, which Hach later incorporated into "Phila Hach's United Nations Cookbook".

Another Tennessee Governor, Lamar Alexander, hosted a dinner for Roots author Alex Hailey, catered by Hach. They remarked at how the house smelled just like freshly baked pies. The fact is that the original pies did not show up, forcing Hach to go to a nearby grocery store, then commandeer the kitchen and bake enough pies for 300 guests.

In the early 1950s, the General Electric Co. sent Hach an electric mixer, which she used on her television show for the first time. When she put it into a bowl of egg whites, eggs were spattered everywhere. She said, "It was just funny. They thought it was supposed to be funny...the show was such fun and such a fiasco".

In her later years, Hach became interested in the plight of refugees from Iraq, Iran and Kurdistan. Through Nashville's International Center for Empowerment she helped organize a series of cooking classes for such immigrants.

Hach died on December 2, 2015, at age 89, after battling colon cancer for about a year. Hach's son, Joseph Karl Hach continues to operate all of the properties of Hachland Hill as of 2016.

== Phila Hach cookbooks ==
- From Phila with Love, Hachland Hill Recipes: Nashville's Famous Caterer Shares her Secrets (1973)
- Kountry Cooking (1974)
- Kitchen Kollege Recipes (1975)
- Phila Hach's United Nations Cookbook (1976)
- Hachland Hill Recipes: From Phila with Love (1980)
- The Official Knoxville, Tennessee World's Fair Cookbook, 1982 (1981)
- Cracker Barrel Old Country Store Vol I (1983)
- Plantation Recipes and Kountry Kooking: The Official Cookbook of Opryland U.S.A. (1983)
- Cracker Barrel Old Country Stores: Old Fashion Intentions (1983)
- Old Timey Recipes and Proverbs to Live By (1984)
- Cracker Barrel Old Country Store Celebrates American Holidays Vol. II (1985)
- Cracker Barrel Old Country Stores: Recipes Specially Selected, Compiles, & Edited for Cracker Barrel, Vol II (1985)
- Tennessee Cooks for Company (1986)
- Homecoming Cookbook: Famous Parties, People, Places (1986)
- Cracker Barrel Old Country Store Recipes and Health Secrets to Make You Live Longer Vol. III (1990)
- Global Feasting Tennessee Style (1996)
- Red Gold Simply Delicious Recipes (1999)
