= Daifallah Masadeh =

Jordanian politician and lawyer

Daifallah Masadeh (1938 – 18 December 2015) was a Jordanian lawyer and politician. He served as the Minister of State for Legal Affairs between 2000 and 2001.

In 1971 he founded the D.Masadeh law firm.
