= Nancy Randall Clark =

American politician

Member of the Maine House of Representatives
- In office 1973–1978

Member of the Maine Senate
- In office 1979–1992

Personal details
- Born: May 6, 1938
- Died: December 28, 2015 (aged 77) Freeport, Maine
- Party: Democratic
- Occupation: Schoolteacher

Nancy Randall Clark (May 6, 1938 – December 28, 2015) was an American schoolteacher and politician from Maine. Clark, a Democrat from Freeport, served in the Maine House of Representatives from 1973 to 1978. She also served in the Maine Senate for the 26th district from 1979 to 1992. During her final three terms, which spanned from 1987 to 1992, Clark served as Senate Majority Leader. She was the first woman to serve in that position.

Clark taught at Freeport High School as a business education teacher. In addition to serving in the Legislature for two decades, Clark was involved with the Freeport Woman's Club and helped restore the Harraseeket Grange. She also belonged the Freeport Elders Association, was a former board member of Freeport Community Services, a member of the Eastern Star and a member of the Daughters of the American Revolution.
