= Waiting for the Clouds =

- Directed by: Yeşim Ustaoğlu
- Screenplay by: Yeşim Ustaoğlu, Petros Markaris
- Produced by: Yeşim Ustaoğlu, Setarh Farsi
- Starring: Rüchan Caliskuri, Ridvan Yagci
- Edited by: Nicolas Gaster
- Music by: Michael Galasso
- Distributed by: Silkroad Production
- Release date: January 19, 2003
- Running time: 90 minutes
- Country: Turkey
- Languages: Turkish, Greek
- Budget: €2,000,000

Waiting for the Clouds (Bulutları Beklerken) is a film from 2003, Turkey. The film was directed by Yeşim Ustaoğlu. It is based on a novel by Georgios Andreadis titled Tamama. The film was produced by Setarh Farsi, Helge Albers and Behrooz Hashemian. The film was nominated in Montréal World Film Festival 2004.

== Plot ==
The neighbor´s son Mehmet is worried about the elderly woman Ayshe, and he likes hearing her stories. When Ayshe´s older sister dies, she refuses to be with the other villager and starts searching for her younger brother in Greece. Waiting for the Clouds takes place in 1975 and Mehmet´s experience is based on the directors' memory from the 70s. And the character Ayshe would not have had to keep her ethnic identity a secret for 50 years if she had lived in a tolerant environment.

== Hiding ethnic identity ==
The character of Ayshe was born Eleni, daughter of indigenous Greeks in the eastern Black Sea region of Northern Turkey, what was once the ancient country of Pontus. She was adopted by a Turkish Muslim family in the World War I. Fear is the reason that Ayshe never spoke of her ethnic past again. In the 70s Turkey the government did put a lot of pressure on the ordinary lives. If there had been tolerance, Ayshe would not have had to keep her ethnic identity a secret for 50 years. But in1970s Turkey, paranoia and a fear of “others” was on the rise while tolerance toward minority ethnic groups diminished.

== Boundaries and Ties ==
The movie has many commonalities with a series of movies by the renowned filmmaker Theodoros Angelopoulos: the borders and their impact on the lives of human beings – as in The Suspended Step of the Stork; a tedious Odyssean search for a family member – as in Landscape in the Mist; the long-lost identity and the fusion of different cultures – as in Ulysses' Gaze and The Suspended Step of the Stork. The similarities are not limited to the content and themes; they also include the form and style of the movie: carefully composed scenes and an enormous number of extended long shots. But there are telling differences as well. In Waiting for the Clouds, Ustaoglu tends to emphasize on the idea of distance, whereas Angelopolous emphasizes on the journey. We barely see Ayshe on the journey; rather, we see her at two different destinations. She belongs to a generation which has gone through the ordeal of Population exchange between Greece and Turkey, and has never managed to fully recover from that emotional wound. When she finally decides to overcome her fears and inhibitions and go to find her lost brother, she trespasses a number of boundaries. We don’t see her cross the physical boundary, the border, – unlike Angelopolous – but her crossing the imagined boundaries that she had created for herself is manifest. “The objective properties of the community are less important than the imagined ones.” Deep in her subconscious, she imagines herself belonging to another nation, another community, and another language. But when she ventures outside her little home in the small village, she gets to see that what she had imagined being her true community, is as strange to her as it gets. She goes back to Turkey, but she is not the same person anymore. She seems like she has put a huge burden off her shoulder. She begins to smile.
