= Michael Giannatos =

Greek actor

- Born: 11 July 1941; Istanbul, Turkey
- Died: 17 September 2013 (aged 72); Athens, Greece
- Occupation: Actor
- Years active: 1966–2013
- Known for: Midnight Express; Captain Corelli's Mandolin; Munich
- Spouse: Chaido
- Children: Maria, Gerasimos & Ioannis

Michalis Giannatos (Greek: Μιχάλης Γιαννάτος; 11 July 1941 – 17 September 2013), alternatively spelled as Michael Yannatos, was a Greek actοr.

Ηe was born in Istanbul, Turkey. He left the city for Greece in 1964 during the long expulsion of Istanbul Greeks.

== Career ==
He studied in Konstantinos Demopoulos' school of drama and first appeared as a professional actor in Georgios Zervoulakos' film Oi stigmatismenoi (Greek: Οι στιγματισμένοι) in 1966. When still a student, he participated in the theatrical play Capetan Michalis (Greek: Καπετάν Μιχάλης) next to Manos Katrakis.

During his long cinematic career, he appeared in close to 100 films, television series and plays. He was a regular in Theodoros Angelopoulos films since he was one of the director's favorite actors. After Megalexandros (Greek: Μεγαλέξανδρος) in 1981, Angelopoulos was always calling him to play in his movies.

He was fluent in five languages; Greek, Turkish, French, Italian and Spanish. Due to that, he appeared in many international productions, including Midnight Express, Captain Corelli's Mandolin, Munich and more. He worked next to great actors such as Anthony Quinn, John Hurt, Nicolas Cage, Penélope Cruz, Christian Bale, Eric Bana and Daniel Craig.

He also played in the film A Touch of Spice [Greek title: Politiki kouzina (Greek: Πολίτικη Κουζίνα)] by Tassos Boulmetis and in the European co-production Le Dernier Seigneur des Balkans.

== Personal life ==
Giannatos was married to Chaido whom he was with until the day he died. They have three children together; Gerasimos (born in 1979), Ioannis (born in 1980) and Maria (born in 1982).

Since 1979, when his first son was born, Giannatos was working night shifts as a receptionist at the Hotel Caravel. He needed the job so he could take care of his family, while at the same time he was working as an actor every time he had the chance. His son Gerasimos said: "His main job was receptionist. With that job we made it through. He was working from 1979 when I was born till 1996 as a receptionist".

In an interview to Giannis Kasapis in 2012, Giannatos said that he loved classical music: "Classical music is the crown of music. Let me tell you how I first loved it. At my school in Constantinople I had an Italian classmate who asked me if I had ever heard classical music. I said no and she invited me to her house. She played one of Chopin's Polonaises...I froze! I heard them all! Since then I became a devotee". Giannatos also stated that he was hearing Greek songs as well, Stelios Kazantzidis and rebetiko, and sometimes even flamenco, tango or csárdás. In the same interview he said that he loved the three ancient Greek tragedians – Aeschylus, Sophocles and Euripides – and of course Aristophanes. Also Hemingway and Agatha Christie.

== Death ==
Giannatos died on 17 September 2013 at the age of 72 due to a heart attack, while watching a football match with friends. As his son said, no one of his friends realized that he was gone, till the moment someone called him and he didn't respond.

The Greek Minister of Culture and Sports expressed his condolence to Giannatos family while stating: "Michalis Giannatos was an exquisite actor who played in many important Greek, but also foreign, movies. But he was also one of those artists and, deep down, one of those people who are proving every day that it's not necessary to have the main part of a movie to be a protagonist".

== Filmography ==
=== Film ===
Year	Title	Role	Notes
1966	Oi stigmatismenoi		First appearance as a professional actor
1968	I Arhontissa kai o Alitis	Bus Conductor	Translated: The Lady and the Tramp
1969	Ta Dio Podia Se Ena...Papoutsi!		Translated: Two Legs in One...Shoe!
1969	To...Thima	Stellas	Translated: The...Victim
1971	Ti Ekanes ston Polemo Thanasi?	Italian officer	Translated: What Were You Doing at the War Thanasis?
1971	I Kori tou Iliou	Turkish Soldier	Translated: The Daughter of the Sun
1971	Enas Xenoiastos Palaviaris	Man at the funeral	Translated: A Carefree Fool
1973	O Tsarlatanos	Patroklos	Translated: The Charlatan
1973	Oi Polemistai tis Eirinis	Soldier Kotsoglou	Translated: The Warriors of Peace
1973	O Anthropos pou Etreche Poli	Lefteris Zevedaios	Translated: The Man Who Ran a Lot
1973	Diktator kalei...Thanasi		Translated: The Dictator is Calling...Thanasis
1975	Bounzaka ala...Ellinika!	Panagos	Translated: Bounzaka in...Greek!
1976	O Thanasis sti Chora tis Sfaliaras	Panagos	Translated: Thanasis in the Land of Slap
1976	Elliniki Ipothesi		Translated: The Greek Affair
1978	The Greek Tycoon	Man on Tomasis's Boat	Uncredited
1978	Midnight Express	Court Translator	USA
1978	O Ilios tou Thanatou	Confiscator	Uncredited; Translated: The Sun of Death
1978	1922		
1978	A Walk in the Sun	Waitor	Sweden & Greece; Original title: En Vandring I Solen; Language: English & Swedish
1979	Ta Paidia tis Piatsas	Baker	Translated: The Kids of the Piazza
1979	O Palavos Kosmos tou Thanasi		Translated: The Crazy World of Thanasis
1980	Megalexandros	Dragoumanos	Translated: Alexander the Great
1980	Vengos, O Trelos Kamikazi	Markos Tamtikos	Translated: Vengos, the Crazy Kamikaze
1980	Geusi Apo Ellada	Vangelis	Translated: Taste From Greece
1982	Aggelos	Gas man	Translated: Angel
1982	To fragma	Chemist	Translated: The Dam
1982	To Aima ton Agalmaton		Translated: The Blood of the Statues
1982	Sti Zougkla tis Athinas/Taxidi stin Protevousa	Spiros	Translated: In Athens' Jungle/Journey to the City
1982	I Strophi	Turkish officer	Translated: Turning point
1983	H Pareksigisi		Translated: The Misunderstanding
1983	Psosoxi, Kindinos!	Michalis	Translated: Caution, Danger!
1983	Ipogeia Diadromi		Translated: Underground Route
1983	Kamikazi Agapi mou	Fotiou	Translated: Kamikaze my Love
1984	Taxidi sta Kithira	Harbor Master	Translated: Voyage to Cythera
1984	The Next One	Captain	USA
1985	Bordelo	Giavasoglou	
1986	The Two Faces of January	Nikos	
1986	O Melissokomos		Translated: The Beekeeper
1987	Pretty Smart	The Turk	USA
1987	O Efialtis		Translated: The Nightmare
1987	The Wind	Policeman	USA
1987	Chamos sto Aigaleo City	Prison guard	Translated: Chaos at Aigaleo City
1988	Gemini – The Twin Stars	1st policeman	Switzerland; Language: English
1988	Topio stin Omixli	Train station guardian	Translated: Landscape in the Mist
1988	O Fakelos Polk Ston Aera		Translated: The Polk File on Air
1989	The Serpent of Death	Greek policeman	USA
1989	Athos I Enoxos		Translated: Innocent Or Guilty
1989	Ipastinomos Thanasis		Translated: Police Lieutenant Thanasis
1990	I Ekdikisi tou Patera	Moustafa Ali, Turkish drug dealer	Translated: Father's Revenge
1990	Ante Geia	Buffet waiter	Translated: Take care
1991	To Meteoro Vima tou Pelargou	Shopkeeper	Translated: The Meteor Step of the Stork
1991	O Drapetis	Shadow theater performer	Translated: Master of the Shadows
1992	To daxtilidi		Short; The Ring
1994	I Zoi Einai sto Dromo		Short; Life is in the Street
1995	Tranzito		
1995	Someone Else's America	Greek agent	USA
1995	Ulysses' Gaze	Albanian Film Library Manager	Uncredited
1995	O Hamenos Thisauros tou Hoursit Pasa		Translated: The Lost Treasure of Hoursit Pasha
1995	Isa Mori Hamoura		Short
1996	Me ton Orfea ton Augousto	Pantelis	Translated: With Orpheus in August
1998	Eternity and a Day	Ticket Inspector	USA
1999	America		Short
1999	O Anthos tis Limnis	Hasan	Translated: The Flower of the Lake
2001	Captain Corelli's Mandolin	Kokolios	USA
2001	To Kalokairi tis Annas	Sales man	Translated: Anna's Summer
2002	Katalathos Astinomikos		TV movie Translated: Policeman by Accident
2002	I Fouska	Uncle	Translated: The Bubble
2002	Alexandros kai Aishe		Translated: Alexander and Aishe
2003	Skipper Straad		Short
2003	Politiki kouzina	Grandpa's friend	English title: A Touch of Spice
2003	Sto Hani	Kara Alis	Translated: To the Inn
2004	Trilogia 1: To Livadi Pou Dakrizei	Zisis	Translated: Trilogy: The Weeping Meadow
2005	Hotel Asteria	Giorgos	TV movie
2005	To Oneiro tou Ikarou	Old Gypsy	Translated: Icarus' Dream
2005	Opa!	Hector	
2005	One in a Million	Old man	USA; Short
2005	Munich	Hotel Aristides Porter	USA
2005	My Family and Other Animals	Porter / Waitor	UK; TV movie
2006	o etsi		
2007	Koroido en'taxei'	Aimilios Roukounas	Translated: All Right Sucker
2008	Oi Prasines, Oi Kokkines, Oi Thalassies Oi Tsouhtres		TV movie Translated: The Green, The Red, The Blue Jellyfish
2008	O Ilias tou 16ou	Manos	Translated: Ilias of 16th
2011	Nisos 2: To kynigi tou hamenou thisavrou	Sifnios	
2011	Einai trelloi autoi oi Ellines		
2012	A Green Story	Grandfather	
2012	Dead Europe	Hotel manager	UK; Uncredited
2012	Lost Monument		Short
2012	O Anthropos pou Taize ton Iskio tou	Roland	Short Translated: The Man Who Was Feeding His Shadow (final film role)

=== Television ===
Year	Title	Role	Notes
1971	Proti grammi		Translated: Forefront
1974	Alithines Istories		Translated: True Stories
1983	I Kiria Doremi	Ship's bartender	Translated: Mrs Doremi
1984	The First Olympics: Athens 1896	Eleni's father	TV mini-series
1991	I Agapi tis Gatas	Moustafas	Translated: The Cat's love
1992	Oi Frouroi tis Achaias	Kir Michalis	Translated: Achaias' Guardians
1992	Epikindines Sxeseis	Markos	Translated: Dangerous Relationships
1993	Casa Di Macaroni	Vasilis	
1994	To Asimenio Dinario		Translated: The Silver Dinar
1995	Stras		
1996	Sofia...Orthi	Mr. Tolis	Episode 13; Translated: Sofia...upright
1998	I Aithousa tou Thronou	Policeman	Episode 1.2; Translated: The Throne Room
1998	I Zoi Pou Den Ezisa	Thomas	Translated: The Life I Didn't Live
1999	Egklimata	Butcher	Episode 1.2; Translated: Crimes
1999	Thimata Eirinis		Episodes 1.1 & 1.15; Translated: Victims of Peace
2000–2001	Kokkinos Kiklos	Mitsos/Bambis/Kafetzis	Episode: Episkeptis; Episode: To Telos Tou Paixnidiou (Mitsos); Episode: Stin Tixi (Bambis); Episode: Chronia Polla (Kafetzis); Translated: Red Circle
2001	Eisai to Tairi Mou	Giorgis	Episode 1.8; Translated: You Are My Soulmate
2004	Voitheia Geitonoi		Translated: Neighbors, help
2004	Efta Thanasimes Petheres		Translated: Seven Deadly Mother-In-Laws
2004	Archipelagos		Translated: Archipelago
2004	Ta Paidia tis Niovis	Kadis	Translated: Niovis' kids
2005	Peninta-Peninta	Turkish officer	Episode 2.1; Translated: Fifty-Fifty
2005	Le dernier seigneur des Balkans (O Teleutaios Arxontas ton Valkanion)		TV mini-series (4 episodes); History; France/Greece/Poland/Spain/Bulgaria; Language: French
2007	Mia Stigmi, Dio Zoes	Anestis	Translated: One Moment, Two Lives
2007–2008	Maria, i Aschimi	Niketas	Translated: Ugly Maria
