= European Film Award for Best Cinematographer =

Annual award given for cinematic achievements in cinematography

European Film Award for Best Cinematography
- Country: Europe
- Presented by: European Film Academy
- First award: 1989
- Currently held by: Benjamin Kračun – The Substance (2024)
- Website: europeanfilmawards.eu

The European Film Award for Best Cinematographer, also known as Carlo Di Palma European Cinematographer Award, is an award given to cinematographers working in the motion picture industry by the European Film Academy.

== Winners and nominees ==
=== 1980s ===
Year	Cinematographer(s)	English title	Original title
1988 (1st)	Nomination for Special Aspect Award		
1988 (1st)	Henri Alekan	Wings of Desire	Der Himmel über Berlin
1988 (1st)	Mário Barroso	The Cannibals	Os Canibais
1989 (2nd)	Ulf Brantas and Jörgen Persson	The Women on the Roof	Kvinnorna på taket
1989 (2nd)	Krzysztof Ptak	300 Miles to Heaven	300 mil do nieba
1989 (2nd)	Yefim Reznik	Little Vera	Ма́ленькая Ве́ра
1989 (2nd)	Sándor Kardos	Eldorado	Eldorádó
1989 (2nd)	Giorgos Arvanitis	Landscape in the Mist	Τοπίο στην ομίχλη

=== 1990s ===
Year	Cinematographer(s)	English title	Original title
1990 (3rd)	Tonino Nardi	Open Doors	Porte aperte
1990 (3rd)	Pierre Lhomme	Cyrano de Bergerac	
1990 (3rd)	Göran Nilsson	The Guardian Angel	Skyddsängeln
1991 (4th)	Walther Vanden Ende	Toto the Hero	Toto le héros
1992 (5th)	Jean-Yves Escoffier	The Lovers on the Bridge	Les Amants du Pont-Neuf
1997 (9th)	John Seale	The English Patient	
1997 (9th)	Tibor Mathé	The Witman Boys	Witman fiúk
1997 (9th)	Ron Fortunato	Nil by Mouth	
1998 (10th)	Adrian Biddle	The Butcher Boy	
1998 (10th)	Thierry Arbogast	Black Cat, White Cat	Црна мачка, бели мачор / Crna mačka, beli mačor
1998 (10th)	Dany Elsen	The Red Dwarf	
1998 (10th)	Joseph Vilsmaier	Comedian Harmonists	
1999 (11th)	Lajos Koltai	Sunshine	
1999 (11th)	Lajos Koltai	The Legend of 1900	La leggenda del pianista sull'oceano
1999 (11th)	Yves Cape	Humanité	L'humanité
1999 (11th)	Alexei Fyodorov and Anatoli Rodinov	Moloch	Молох
1999 (11th)	Jacek Petrycki	Journey to the Sun	Güneşe Yolculuk

=== 2000s ===
Year	Cinematographer(s)	English title	Original title	Ref.
2000 (13th)	Vittorio Storaro	Goya in Bordeaux	Goya en Bourdeaux	
2000 (13th)	Yuri Klimenko	The Barracks	Барак	
2000 (13th)	Agnès Godard	Beau Travail		
2000 (13th)	Éric Guichard and Jean-Paul Meurisse	Himalaya	Himalaya: L'Enfance d'un chef	
2000 (13th)	Edgar Moura	Jaime		
2000 (13th)	Aleksandr Burov	The Wedding	Свадьба	
2001 (14th)	Bruno Delbonnel	Amélie	Le Fabuleux Destin d'Amélie Poulain	
2001 (14th)	Éric Gautier	Intimacy	Intimité'	
2001 (14th)	Rein Kotov	The Heart of the Bear	Karu süda	
2001 (14th)	Frank Griebe	The Princess and the Warrior	Der Krieger und die Kaiserin	
2001 (14th)	Fabio Olmi	The Profession of Arms	Il mestiere delle armi	
2001 (14th)	Tamás Babos	Paszport		
2002 (15th)	Paweł Edelman	The Pianist		
2002 (15th)	Ivan Strasburg	Bloody Sunday		
2002 (15th)	Javier Aguirresarobe	Talk to Her	Hable con ella	
2002 (15th)	Frank Griebe	Heaven		
2002 (15th)	Timo Salminen	The Man Without a Past	Mies vailla menneisyyttä	
2002 (15th)	Alwin H. Küchler	Grill Point	Halbe Treppe	
2002 (15th)	Tilman Büttner	Russian Ark	Русский ковчег	
2003 (16th)	Anthony Dod Mantle	Dogville		
2003 (16th)	Anthony Dod Mantle	28 Days Later		
2003 (16th)	Chris Menges	Dirty Pretty Things		
2003 (16th)	Marcel Zyskind	In This World		
2003 (16th)	Italo Petriccione	I'm Not Scared	Io non ho paura	
2003 (16th)	Bogumił Godfrejów	Distant Lights	Lichter	
2003 (16th)	Tom Fährmann	The Miracle of Bern	Das Wunder von Bern	
2004 (17th)	Eduardo Serra	Girl with a Pearl Earring		
2004 (17th)	Lajos Koltai	Being Julia		
2004 (17th)	Alwin H. Küchler	Code 46		
2004 (17th)	José Luis Alcaine	Bad Education	La mala educación	
2004 (17th)	Javier Aguirresarobe	The Sea Inside	Mar adentro	
2004 (17th)	Andreas Sinanos	Trilogy: The Weeping Meadow	Τριλογία: Το λιβάδι που δακρύζει	
2005 (18th)	Franz Lustig	Don't Come Knocking		
2005 (18th)	Christian Berger	Hidden	Caché	
2005 (18th)	Anthony Dod Mantle	Manderlay		
2005 (18th)	Ryszard Lenczewski	My Summer of Love		
2005 (18th)	Gyula Pados	Fateless	Sorstalanság	
2005 (18th)	Bruno Delbonnel	A Very Long Engagement	Un long dimanche de fiançailles	
2006 (19th)	Barry Ackroyd	The Wind that Shakes the Barley		
2006 (19th)	José Luis Alcaine	Volver		
2006 (19th)	Timo Salminen	Lights in the Dusk	Laitakaupungin valot	
2006 (19th)	Roman Osin	Pride & Prejudice		
2007 (20th)	Frank Griebe	Perfume: The Story of a Murderer		
2007 (20th)	Mikhail Krichman	The Banishment	Изгнание	
2007 (20th)	Anthony Dod Mantle	The Last King of Scotland		
2007 (20th)	Fabio Zamarion	The Unknown Woman	La sconosciuta	
2008 (21st)	Marco Onorato	Gomorrah	Gomorra	
2008 (21st)	Luca Bigazzi	Il Divo		
2008 (21st)	Oscar Faura	The Orphanage	El orfanato	
2008 (21st)	Sergey Trofimov and Rogier Stoffers	Mongol	Монгол	
2009 (22nd)	Anthony Dod Mantle	Antichrist		
2009 (22nd)	Anthony Dod Mantle	Slumdog Millionaire		
2009 (22nd)	Christian Berger	The White Ribbon	Das weiße Band	
2009 (22nd)	Maksim Drozdov and Alisher Khamidkhodjaev	Paper Soldier	Бумажный солдат	
2009 (22nd)	Stéphane Fontaine	A Prophet	Un prophète	

=== 2010s ===
Year	Cinematographer(s)	English title	Original title	Ref.
2010 (23rd)	Giora Bejach	Lebanon		
2010 (23rd)	Caroline Champetier	Of Gods and Men	Des hommes et des dieux	
2010 (23rd)	Pavel Kostomarov	How I Ended This Summer	Как я провёл этим летом	
2010 (23rd)	Barış Özbiçer	Honey	Bal	
2011 (24th)	Manuel Alberto Claro	Melancholia		
2011 (24th)	Fred Kelemen	The Turin Horse	A torinói ló	
2011 (24th)	Guillaume Schiffman	The Artist		
2011 (24th)	Adam Sikora	Essential Killing		
2012 (25th)	Sean Bobbitt	Shame		
2012 (25th)	Darius Khondji	Amour		
2012 (25th)	Bruno Delbonnel	Faust	Фауст	
2012 (25th)	Gökhan Tiryaki	Once Upon a Time in Anatolia	Bir Zamanlar Anadolu'da	
2012 (25th)	Hoyte van Hoytema	Tinker Tailor Soldier Spy		
2013 (26th)	Asaf Sudry	Fill the Void	למלא את החלל	
2014 (27th)	Łukasz Żal and Ryszard Lenczewski	Ida		
2015 (28th)	Martin Gschlacht	Goodnight Mommy	Ich seh, Ich seh	
2016 (29th)	Camilla Hjelm Knudsen	Land of Mine	Under sandet	
2017 (30th)	Mikhail Krichman	Loveless	Нелюбовь	
2018 (31st)	Martin Otterbeck	Utøya: July 22	Utøya 22. juli	
2019 (32nd)	Robbie Ryan	The Favourite		

=== 2020s ===
Year	Cinematographer(s)	English title	Original title	Ref.
2020 (33rd)	Matteo Cocco	Hidden Away	Volevo nascondermi	
2021 (34th)	Crystel Fournier	Great Freedom	Große Freiheit	
2022 (35th)	Kate McCullough	The Quiet Girl	An Cailín Ciúin	
2023 (36th)	Rasmus Videbæk	The Promised Land	Bastarden	
2024 (37th)	Benjamin Kračun	The Substance		
2025 (38th)	Mauro Herce	Sirāt		
2025 (38th)	Fabian Gamper	Sound of Falling	In die Sonne schauen	
2025 (38th)	Manu Dacosse	The Stranger	L'Étranger	
2026 (39th)	Gris Jordana	La bola negra		
2026 (39th)	Frank van den Eeden	Coward		
2026 (39th)	Łukasz Żal	Fatherland		

== Most wins for Best Cinematography by country ==
Country	Awards	Nominations
France	1	10
United Kingdom	6	4
Spain	1	4
Denmark	2	1
Netherlands		2
Belgium	1	1
Israel	2	
Germany	1	7
Italy	4	4
Hungary	1	6
(Republic of Ireland) Ireland	2	
Poland	2	4
Russia	1	6
Finland		2
Ukraine		
Austria	1	2
Sweden	1	1
Turkey	0	
Soviet Union	0	
Bosnia and Herzegovina	0	
Romania	0	
Norway	0	1
Bulgaria	0	
Croatia	0	1
Czech Republic	0	
Greece	0	2

== See also ==
- Academy Award for Best Cinematography
- BAFTA Award for Best Cinematography
- César Award for Best Cinematography, Lumière Award for Best Cinematography
- Critics' Choice Movie Award for Best Cinematography
- American Society of Cinematographers Award for Outstanding Achievement in Cinematography in Theatrical Releases
- David di Donatello for Best Cinematography
- Goya Award for Best Cinematography
- Polish Academy Award for Best Cinematography, Camerimage
- Golden Calf for Best Photography
- Czech Lion Award for Best Cinematography
- Magritte Award for Best Cinematography
- Guldbagge Award for Best Cinematography
- Robert Award for Best Cinematography, Bodil Award for Best Cinematographer
- Golden Arena for Best Cinematography
- Manaki Brothers Film Festival
