= Christoforos Nezer (d. 1995) =

Greek actor (1903–1995)

Christoforos Nezer Χριστόφορος Νέζερ
- Born: 1903; Athens, Greece
- Died: 1995 (aged 91–92); Athens, Greece
- Occupation: actor

Christoforos Nezer (Greek: Χριστόφορος Νέζερ; 1903 – 1995) was a Greek actor and brother of Marika Nezer.

He was descended from the Bavarian Nezer family, which came to Greece with King Otto. He took part in several movies under the director Theodoros Angelopoulos.

== Filmography ==
Year	Film	Greek name and translation	Role
1943	Grammos	Γράμμος	-
1958	The Lake of Thinking		
1972	Days of '36	Μέρες του '36 (Days of '36)	prison warden
1975	O katadikos	Ο κατάδικος (The Convict)	-
1975	O thiasos	Ο θίασος (The Troupe)	-
1977	Oi kynigoi	Οι κυνηγοί (The Hunters)	a politician
1978	I kangeloporta	Η καγκελόπορτα (The Iron Gate)	-
1980	Eleftherios Venizelos	Ελευθέριος Βενιζέλος	-
1980	Megalexandros	Μεγαλέξανδρος' (Alexander the Great)	Mr. Tzelepis
1984	Loufa kai Parallagi	Λούφα και Παραλλαγή	general
1986	O melissokomos	Ο μελισσοκόμος (The Beekeper)	-
1991	to meteoro vima tou pelargou	Το μετέωρο βήμα του πελαργού (The Suspended Step of the Stork)	president of the parliament
1993	Gynaikes dilitirio	Γυναίκες δηλητήριο (Poison Women)	Giorgos
1994	To spiti stin exohi	Το σπίτι στην εξοχή (A House In the Countryside)	-
1995	To vlemma tou Odyssea	Το βλέμμα του Οδυσσέα (Ulysses' Gaze)	-
