= Days of '36 =

1972 film by Theo Angelopoulos

- DVD cover
- Μέρες του '36
- Directed by: Theo Angelopoulos
- Written by: Theo Angelopoulos; Petros Markaris; Stratis Karras; Thanassis Valtinos
- Produced by: Giorgos Papalios
- Starring: Kostas Pavlou; Thanos Grammenos; Giorgos Kyritsis; Petros Zarkadis; Christoforos Neezer; Toula Stathopoulou; Christos Kalavrouzos; Vasilis Tsaglos; Giannis Kandilas; Petros Hoidas; Takis Doukatos; Petros Markaris; Kostas Sfikas; Christoforos Himaras; Vangelis Kazan; Alekos Boubis; Giorgos Tzifos; Kaiti Ibrohori; Yannis Smaragdis; Thanassis Valtinos; Lambros Papadimitrakis; Titika Vlahopoulou; Yanka Avayianou; Kiriakos Katrivanos; Panos Kokkinopoulos; Kostas Mandilas
- Cinematography: Giorgos Arvanitis; Vasilis Hristomoglou
- Edited by: Vasilis Syropoulos
- Music by: Giorgos Papastephanou
- Production company: Papalios Productions
- Distributed by: Trigon-film
- Release date: 20 September 1972 (Thessaloniki Festival of Greek Cinema)
- Running time: 105 minutes
- Country: Greece
- Language: Greek

Days of '36 (Greek: Μέρες του '36, romanized: Méres tou '36) is a 1972 Greek dramatic independent underground art film directed by Theo Angelopoulos. Its title is a tribute to Constantine P. Cavafy.

Filmed during the Regime of the Colonels, the film draws parallels between the regime and the dictatorship of Ioannis Metaxas, but it does so implicitly, in order to escape censorship. Angelopoulos elsewhere speaks of an "aesthetic of the unspoken." He points out that the most important things always happen out of the field of view, behind closed doors or on the phone. When something is said, it is only whispered. According to Angelopoulos, he called the film "the opposite of Z".

== Synopsis ==
In May 1936, in a Greece riven by political strife, a trade union leader is assassinated. Sofianos, a petty criminal and smuggler as well as a police informant and leftist agitator, is accused of the murder. Kept incommunicado in a room separate from the other detainees, his only two visitors are a member of parliament from the Conservative Party and his driver, who is also his brother. One day, Sofianos takes the member of parliament as a hostage inside his cell to obtain his release before midnight; it is not clear how he has obtained the revolver which he was using. The prison guards are powerless, while the warden is under pressure from his political bosses to find a quick resolution to the standoff.

Sofianos's lawyer tries to reason with him, explaining to his client that the weapon in his possession is a trap that has been set up for him, and that by taking the deputy as a hostage he is playing the game of those who accuse him. The lawyer conducts an investigation to exonerate Sofianos but ends up being beaten up in a deserted street.

In the meantime, an escape attempt takes place in the prison, but three escapees are caught up in the countryside.

Under pressure from representatives of the major powers, the political and prison authorities are trying to put an end to the hostage-taking by various means, including the poisoning of the prisoner. Eventually, at nightfall, a sniper shoots Sofianos in his cell.

The next morning, the three escapees are shot and the body of Sofianos is added to the funeral truck.

== Technical information ==
- Title: Days of '36
- Original title: Μέρες του '36 (tr. Méres tou '36)
- Director: Theo Angelopoulos
- Screenplay: Theo Angelopoulos, Petros Markaris, Stratis Karras and Thanassis Valtinos
- Cinematography: Giorgos Arvanitis
- Production Design/Costume Design: Mikes Karapiperis
- Music: Giorgos Papastephanou
- Editing: Vassilis Syropoulos
- Production Manager: Giorgos Samiotis
- Country: Greece
- Format: Color – Mono – 35 mm
- Genre: Drama
- Duration: 105 Minutes
- Release date: 20 September 1972 (Thessaloniki Festival of Greek Cinema)

== Cast ==
- Kostas Pavlou: Sofianos
- Thanos Grammenos: Sofianos' Brother/Kriezis's Driver
- Giorgos Kyritsis: Kontaxis
- Petros Zarkadis: Sofianos' Accomplice
- Christoforos Neezer: Prison Director
- Toula Stathopoulou: Prostitute
- Christos Kalavrouzos: Second Trade Unionist
- Vasilis Tsaglos: Prison Guard
- Giannis Kandilas: Minister Kriezis/Hostage
- Petros Hoidas: Prosecutor
- Takis Doukatos: Police Chief
- Petros Markaris: Murdered Trade Unionist
- Kostas Sfikas: Prosecutor's Assistant
- Christoforos Himaras: Minister
- Vangelis Kazan
- Alekos Boubis
- Giorgos Tzifos
- Kaiti Ibrohori
- Yannis Smaragdis
- Thanassis Valtinos
- Lambros Papadimitrakis
- Titika Vlahopoulou
- Yanka Avayianou
- Kiriakos Katrivanos
- Panos Kokkinopoulos
- Kostas Mandilas

== Awards ==
It was awarded Best Director and Best Picture at the Thessaloniki Festival of Greek Cinema in 1972. At the Berlin International Film Festival in 1973, it received a prize from the International Federation of Film Critics.

== Bibliography ==
- Michel Demopoulos, directeur de publication, Le Cinéma grec [Greek Cinema], Paris, Centre Georges Pompidou, collection "cinéma/pluriel," 1995, 263 pages, ISBN 2858508135. (in French)
- Vrasidas Karalis, A History of Greek Cinema, New York City and London, Continuum International Publishing Group, 2012, 344 pages, ISBN 978-1-4411-9447-3.
- Sylvie Rollet, directeur de publication (préface: Theo Angelopoulos), Théorème 9: Théo Angelopoulos au fil du temps [Theo Angelopoulos over the Course of Time], Paris, Presses Sorbonne Nouvelle, 2007, 189 pages, ISBN 978-2-87854-372-8. (in French)
- Stéphane Sawas, "Grèce (1967–1974) – Les écrans grecs sous la dictature des colonels: la grande rupture,» [Greece (1967–1974) – Greek Screens Under the Dictatorship of the Colonels: The Great Break] dans Raphaël Muller et Thomas Wieder, directeurs de publication, Cinéma et régimes autoritaires au xxe siècle: Écrans sous influence [Cinema and Authoritarian Regimes in the Twentieth Century: Screens Under Influence], Paris, Éditions École Normale Supérieure rue d'Ulm et Presses Universitaires de France, collection "Les rencontres de Normale Sup'," 2008, 285 pages, ISBN 978-2-13-055749-4. (in French)
- Stéphane Sawas, "Entre amnésie collective et mémoire retrouvée: La guerre civile grecque au cinéma," [Between Collective Amnesia and Rediscovered Memory: The Greek Civil War in Cinema] dans Carola Hähnel-Mesnard, Marie Liénard-Yeterian, et Cristina Marinas, directeurs de publication, Culture et mémoire: Représentations contemporaines de la mémoire dans les espaces mémoriels, les arts du visuel, la littérature et le théâtre [Culture and Memory: Contemporary Representations of Memory in Memorial Spaces, Visual Arts, Literature and Theater], Paris, Éditions de l'École Polytechnique et Éditions Ellipses, 2008, 534 pages, ISBN 978-2-7302-1492-6. (in French)
