= The Hunters (1977 film) =

1977 film

- Directed by: Theodoros Angelopoulos
- Written by: Theodoros Angelopoulos; Stratis Karras
- Produced by: Theodoros Angelopoulos
- Starring: Vangelis Kazan; Eva Kotamanidou; Giorgos Danis; Mairi Chronopoulou
- Cinematography: Giorgos Arvanitis
- Edited by: Giorgos Triandafyllou
- Music by: Loukianos Kilaidonis
- Release date: 10 October 1977
- Running time: 168 minutes
- Country: Greece
- Language: Greek

The Hunters (Greek: Οι Κυνηγοί, translit. Oi kynigoi) is a 1977 Greek dramatic art film directed by Theodoros Angelopoulos. It was entered into the 1977 Cannes Film Festival.

== Plot ==
The film's plot takes place at Lake Pamvotida and begins when six hunters (an industrialist, a politician, a soldier, a contractor, a former prefect and a hotelier) discover, on New Year's Eve 1977, the body of a guerrilla from the Civil War period. The group of hunters transports the body to the remote hotel where their wives are staying, and there begins an intense explosion of historical memory: an endless flashback to the last three decades and the guilt that weighs on them. Their tormenting thoughts end when they decide to return the body to where it belongs: under the snow.

== Cast ==
- Mary Chronopoulou as Mrs. Diamantis
- Eva Kotamanidou as The General's wife
- Aliki Georgouli as Mrs. Papadopoulos
- Vangelis Kazan as Hotelier
- Betty Valassi as Sawas' wife
- Giorgos Danis as Industrialist
- Stratos Pahis as Constructor
- Christoforos Nezer as Politician
- Dimitris Kaberidis as Yannis
- Takis Doukakos as Military Police Chief
- Nikos Kouros as Militarist
