= Alexander the Great (1980 film) =

- Directed by: Theodoros Angelopoulos
- Written by: Theo Angelopoulos; Petros Markaris
- Produced by: Theo Angelopoulos; Nikos Angelopoulos
- Starring: Omero Antonutti; Eva Kotamanidou; Mihalis Giannatos
- Cinematography: Giorgos Arvanitis
- Edited by: Giorgos Triandafyllou
- Music by: Chalaris Christodoulos
- Production companies: Theo Angelopoulos Films; Radiotelevisione Italiana; Zweites Deutsches Fernsehen; Greek Film Center
- Distributed by: IFA (Argentina) fr:trigon-film (Switzerland, Austria, Germany)
- Release date: July 1980
- Running time: 210 minutes
- Countries: Greece, Italy, West Germany
- Languages: Greek; English

Alexander the Great (Greek: Ο Μεγαλέξανδρος) is a 1980 Greek film directed by Theo Angelopoulos.

== Plot ==
The film is based on the Dilesi Massacre of 1870 during which several bandits kidnapped British tourists and demanded a ransom. The film opens with a character named Alexander the Great who is the leader of the bandits being freed from prison.

Alexander and the bandits have kidnapped a group of British aristocrats and bring them to an agrarian community in the mountains that Alexander, the villagers, and a group of Italian anarchists (who arrive later in the film) are trying to build on a system of public ownership and egalitarian beliefs. They demand that the aristocrats return the land to the villagers but their demands are not met when soldiers surround the settlement.

The anarchists, at differences with Alexander, try to leave but are killed by the soldiers. The soldiers also kill Alexander's original comrades. Alexander kills the hostages, and the villagers murder Alexander, in what Vrasidas Karalis notes as a practice of theophagia, or god-eating. The only survivor is a child. The camera pans over Athens and a voice-over states: "This is how Alexander entered the cities...."

== Cast ==
- Omero Antonutti as Alexandros
- Eva Kotamanidou as Alexandros' Daughter
- Mihalis Giannatos as Dragoumanos
- Grigoris Evangelatos as Alexandros' Schoolteacher
- Miranda Kounelaki as Mrs. Tzelepis
- Laura De Marchi as Italian Anarchist
- Toula Stathopoulou as Village Woman
- Thanos Grammenos as Village Man
- Haris Pisimisis as Haralabos Pisimisis
- Christoferos Nezer as Mr. Tzelepis
- Francesco Carnelutti as Italian Anarchist
- Norman Mozzato as Italian Anarchist
- Brizio Montinario as Italian Anarchist
- Claude Betan as Italian Anarchist
- Ilias Zafeiropoulos as Alexandros as a Schoolboy

== Production ==
The film was financed by Angelopoulos himself along with the help of German and Italian television. The source text was The Book of Megalexandros and the Dilesi Massacre in 1972.

== Style ==
Angelopoulos has said on his own film: "The first thing to be said is that it's the most simple film I've made so far. Its progress is linear, and it hasn't developed its stylistic form in the course of editing like the other films. There are no chronological jumps--the film begins on New Year's Eve in 1900 and proceeds from there, except for the final sequence when the little Alexander becomes Megalexandros and goes towards the city. Which is a modern city--present-day Athens, in fact--in contrast to the rural, turn-of-the-century world of the rest of the film. When the little Alexander enters the city, he brings all the experience of the century with him. He has gained a total experience of life, sex and death, and over it there is a great question mark. How long will the night last, and when will a new day break?"

== Reaction and Interpretation ==
While Dan Georgakas writes that Alexander the Great was not well-received critically when first released, though the film has been well received at international festivals. Yet, it still does not have a Region 1 release. In a program note, a critic named K.J. notes that "Only a filmmaker with Angelopoulos' daring would attempt to translate his epic vision of Greece to film."

Dougal MacDonald reviews less favorably: "It is this [technique of long shots and slow pans] which has driven many festival-goers to a state of ecstasy, to assertions that this is imaginative and what filmmaking is really about. There is also a small band (of which I am one) which holds that once is imagination, twice is repetition and thrice and after is a mixture of pretentious and boring. One can make such a shot clockwise or counter-clockwise in one dimension. Thereafter, the eschewing of boredom insists either on movement in another dimension or discovery of a new creative toy. By failing to realize this, Angelopoulos has marred his film by what he patently intended to be its major creative feature." A reviewer for Time Out lauded the work as a "relentless demonstration of stylistic brilliance", but also stated that "it leaves one wondering why the parable is not more challenging and its point less predictable."

Vrasidas Karalis writes that the film reflects the contemporary state of political messianism where people see themselves as leaders who have to carry out a specific historical mission. He compares it to the cult of personality of Jim Jones in Jonestown. Karalis adds that Angelopoulos reflected folk painting and "the spatial arrangement of Byzantine iconography," noting the prevalence of slow movement, off-camera action, and the use of earthy colors.

== Accolades ==
Film Festival	Award	Recipient	Result
Venice Film Festival 1980	Golden Lion for Experimental Film	Theo Angelopoulos	Won
Venice Film Festival 1980	Award of the International Federation of Film Critics (FIPRESCI)	Theo Angelopoulos	Won
Panhellenic Union of Cinema Critics (PHUCC)	Best Film	Theo Angelopoulos	Won
Thessaloniki International Film Festival	Gold Award	Theo Angelopoulos	Won
Thessaloniki International Film Festival	Best Film	Theo Angelopoulos	Won
Thessaloniki International Film Festival	Best Photography	Arvanitis Giorgos	Won
Thessaloniki International Film Festival	Best Scenography	Karapiperis Mikes	Won
Thessaloniki International Film Festival	Best Sound Recording	Lazaridis Argyris	Won

== See also ==
- Alexander (2004 film)
- Alexander the Great (1956 film)
- Alexander the Great
