= 8th European Film Awards =

Award ceremony for European films held in 1995

- Date: 12 November 1995
- Site: Bar jeder Vernunft, Berlin, Germany
- Hosted by: none
- Organized by: European Film Academy

Highlights
- Best Picture: Land and Freedom

The 8th European Film Awards were presented on 12 November 1995 in Berlin, Germany. The winners were selected by the members of the European Film Academy.

== Awards ==
=== Best Film ===
English title	Original title	Director(s)	Country
Land and Freedom		Ken Loach	United Kingdom
Rendez-Vous in Paris	Les Rendez-vous de Paris	Éric Rohmer	France
Ulysses' Gaze	Το βλέμμα του Οδυσσέα	Theo Angelopoulos	Greece
Butterfly Kiss		Michael Winterbottom	United Kingdom
Deathmaker	Der Totmacher	Romuald Karmakar	Germany
La Haine	La Haine	Mathieu Kassovitz	France

=== Best Documentary ===
English title	Original title	Director(s)	Country
Viva Stalin	-	Jens Meurer	Germany

=== Lifetime Achievement Award ===
Recipient	Occupation
(France) Marcel Carné	film director
