= The Beekeeper (1986 film) =

1986 film

- Film poster
- Directed by: Theodoros Angelopoulos
- Written by: Theodoros Angelopoulos; Tonino Guerra; Dimitris Nollas
- Produced by: Theodoros Angelopoulos
- Starring: Marcello Mastroianni
- Cinematography: Giorgos Arvanitis
- Edited by: Takis Yannopoulos
- Music by: Eleni Karaindrou
- Release date: 23 October 1986
- Running time: 122 minutes
- Country: Greece
- Language: Greek

The Beekeeper (Greek: Ο Μελισσοκόμος, translit. O Melissokomos) is a 1986 Greek drama art film directed by Theodoros Angelopoulos. The film is the second installment in Angelopoulos's "trilogy of silence", preceded by Voyage to Cythera and followed by Landscape in the Mist. Swedish filmmaker Ingmar Bergman hailed The Beekeeper as a "masterpiece".

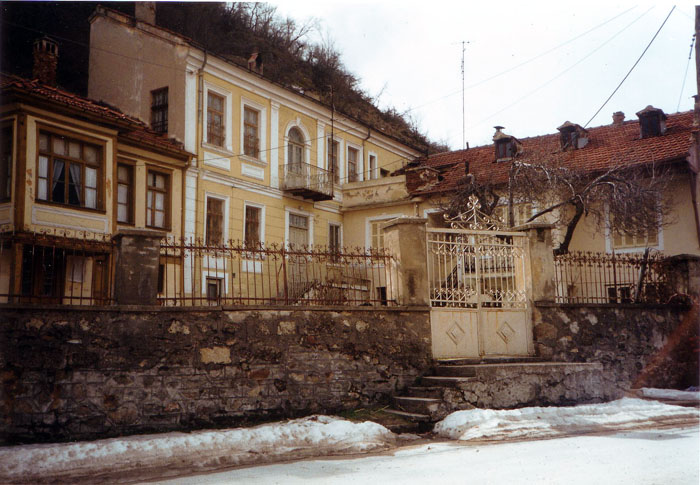
House of Florina where the scenes were filmed. The Prespes lakes and Florina are the setting for many films by Theodoros Angelopoulos.

The Beekeeper was selected for the 43rd Venice International Film Festival. The film was the first of Angelopoulos's to use an already well-known actor, in this case, Marcello Mastroianni, who by that time had already won the Best Actor award at the 1970 Cannes Film Festival once and had been nominated twice for the Best Actor at the 35th Academy Awards and the 50th Academy Awards.

== Plot ==
The film follows the journey of Spyros, a beekeeper, to various parts of Greece after his daughter's wedding. Spyros has just retired as a teacher and sets out on his annual journey in spring to move his beehives to a series of locations with flowering plants. A girl hops on Spyros's truck, and travels with him. They visit Spyros's old friends and his wife along the way, and finally arrive at a theater owned by one of his friends, which is about to be sold. There, Spyros and the girl finally have an erotic encounter, long after Spyros has tried to coerce her into kissing but failed. The girl leaves after a few nights, before the movie ends with Spyros turning over his beehive boxes, causing him to be stung repeatedly by the understandably angry bees. The final scene sees the dying Spyros tapping on the ground, as he continues to suffer from more and more agonising stings, which reminds us of the tapping of his sick friend before Spyros left him in the hospital.

== Cast ==
- Marcello Mastroianni as Spyros
- Nadia Mourouzi as the girl
- Serge Reggiani as the sick man
- Jenny Roussea as Spyros's wife
- Dinos Iliopoulos as Spyros's friend, owner of Ciné Pantheon
- Iakovos Panotas as soldier/the girl's boyfriend
- Vassia Panagopoulou
- Stamatis Gardelis
- Mihalis Giannatos
- Karyofyllia Karabeti
- Konstandinos Konstandopoulos
- Nikos Kouros
- Christoforos Nezer
- Stratos Pahis
- Dimitris Poulikakos
- Athinodoros Prousalis

== Reception ==
Janet Maslin criticized The Beekeeper in 1993, writing that it "wastes Marcello Mastroianni in his title role" and that "(n)ot even those inclined to dwell on the film's occasional honeycomb imagery or its heavy sense of foreboding will find much to command the attention," arguing that The Beekeeper is interesting only in the context of Angelopoulos's other two titles in his "trilogy of silence" (which also includes Voyage to Cythera and Landscape in the Mist). It was also written in Time Out that the film "has a stately pace and a shortage of event or information that are a lot to take." John Gillett for a London Film Festival screening praised The Beekeeper as having "wonderfully textured images by Arvanitis, a succession of beautifully sustained traveling shots, and an emotional intensity which moves to a grave, overwhelming climax."

Ronald Bergan, in his obituary of Angelopoulos, described The Beekeeper as a "compelling film" which "could be called a metaphysical road movie". In The Independent, however, Holly Williams in 2010 lauded the film as "ponderously paced but poignant" and stated that "the directing is assured, and the performances restrained and heartbreakingly believable." Acquarello of Strictly Film School called the work "a haunting, compassionate, and profoundly melancholic portrait of isolation, dislocation, estrangement, and obsolescence," referring to it as an "indelible chronicle" of the contemporary Greek society.

The Beekeeper was nominated for Golden Lion at the 43rd Venice International Film Festival.
