= Trilogy: The Weeping Meadow =

- Greek poster for the film.
- Original title: Τριλογία: Το λιβάδι που δακρύζει
- Directed by: Theo Angelopoulos
- Screenplay by: Theo Angelopoulos; Tonino Guerra; Petros Markaris; Giorgio Silvagni
- Produced by: Nikos Sekeris
- Starring: Alexandra Aidini; Thalia Argyriou; Giorgos Armenis
- Cinematography: Andreas Sinanos
- Edited by: Yorgos Triantafyllou
- Music by: Eleni Karaindrou
- Distributed by: Rosebud (Greece); Celluloid Dreams (Worldwide)
- Release dates: 11 February 2004 (Berlinale); 20 February 2004
- Running time: 169 minutes
- Country: Greece
- Language: Greek
- Box office: $64,424

Trilogy: The Weeping Meadow (Greek: Τριλογία: Το λιβάδι που δακρύζει) is a 2004 Greek historical drama film written and directed by Theo Angelopoulos. It stars Alexandra Aidini, Thalia Argyriou, Giorgos Armenis, Vasilis Kolovos and Nikos Poursanidis, and was released during the 2004 Berlin International Film Festival on 11 February 2004.

It is the first film of a projected trilogy about recent events in Greek history. Followed in 2008 with The Dust of Time, the trilogy was ultimately left incomplete after Angelopoulos' unexpected death in January 2012.

== Plot ==
The film revives themes of Angelopoulos' 1975 film The Travelling Players, and its events span from 1919 to the aftermath of World War II. It tells the story of Greek history through the sufferings of one family. A band of refugees that returns to Greece after the Russian Revolution adopts an orphaned girl, Eleni (Alexandra Aidini). Eleni becomes the focus of the story. The film follows her through adolescence and the marriage to her musician adopted-brother Alexis (Nikos Poursanidis). Eleni becomes pregnant by Alexis, and bears twin boys, who are sent away at birth. Many years later she is forced to marry her widowed adopted father. On her wedding day, Eleni escapes with Alexis to Thessaloniki, where they reunite with their sons. Their lives are then ripped apart by World War II and the ensuing Greek Civil War.

== Cast ==
- Alexandra Aidini as Eleni
- Thalia Argyriou as Danae
- Giorgos Armenis as Nikos the Fiddler
- Vasilis Kolovos as Spyros
- Nikos Poursanidis as Alexis
- Eva Kotamanidou as Cassandra
- Toula Stathopoulou as Woman in Coffee House

== Reception ==
=== Critical reception ===
Trilogy: The Weeping Meadow received generally favorable reviews from critics. At Metacritic it holds a 73/100 score based on 12 reviews. At Rotten Tomatoes it has a 67% score based on 27 reviews, with an average rating of 6.3/10. Peter Bradshaw of The Guardian gave the film two out of five stars, and commented: "The movie is fiercely austere; no human emotion leaks out and the characters are as blank as chess-pieces." Dana Stevens of The New York Times: "The Weeping Meadow is a beautiful and devastating meditation on war, history and loss." Derek Elley of Variety: "The movie plays like a career summation in which the 68-year-old writer-director has simply run out new ideas."

=== Awards and nominations ===
Awards

- FIPRESCI Award at the European Film Awards 2004
- "Spiritual Competition" Jury Award at the Fajr International Film Festival 2005

Nominations

- Golden Bear at the Berlin International Film Festival 2004
- European Film Awards 2004
  - "People's Choice Award"
  - "Best Director" (Theodoros Angelopoulos)
  - "Best Cinematographer" (Andreas Sinanos)
  - "Best Composer" (Eleni Karaindrou)
