= Mary Chronopoulou =

Greek actress (1933–2023)

Mary Chronopoulou Μαίρη Χρονοπούλου
- Born: 16 July 1933; Athens, Greece
- Died: 6 October 2023 (aged 90); Athens, Greece
- Resting place: Paiania, Attica
- Education: National Theatre of Greece
- Occupations: Actress; Singer
- Years active: 1954–1996; 2023
- Spouse: Dimos Botsaris (m. 1975; div. 1976)

Mary Chronopoulou (Greek: Μαίρη Χρονοπούλου; 16 July 1933 – 6 October 2023) was a Greek actress. She was one of the most popular actresses of the 1960s.

== Life and career ==
Mary Chronopoulou was born in Athens on 16 July 1933. She starred in many films, 16 of which were produced by Finos Film. She was one of the main protagonists of Greek theatre. Chronopoulou died from complications of a fall at an Athens hospital on 6 October 2023, at the age of 90. Her remains were cremated after a civil ceremony at her home in Paiania, where her ashes were later interred.

== Works ==
=== Film ===
| Year | Title | Role |
|---|---|---|
| 1954 | Happy Beginning | Young girl in the dream |
| 1958 | A Matter of Dignity | Chloe’s friend |
| 1959 | Stournara 288 | Mary |
| 1962 | Without Identity | Zanet |
| 1963 | Anxious Youth | Dora |
| 1963 | The Red Lanterns | Mary Pana |
| 1963 | The Lazy One | Boubi Pelekanou |
| 1964 | The Oldchaps | Anna |
| 1964 | Scream | Anna |
| 1964 | The Sunday Girl | Barbara |
| 1964 | Cyprus in Flames | Maria |
| 1965 | The Naked Brigade | Katina |
| 1965 | The Rogues | Stella |
| 1966 | Blood on the Land | Irene |
| 1966 | The Fear | Kanali |
| 1966 | Tears for Elektra | Lina |
| 1966 | Zero Hour Society | Lia Mourouzi |
| 1967 | The Blue Beads | Sophia |
| 1967 | Bread for a Runaway | Marina |
| 1968 | A Lady at the Bouzoukia | Elena Apergi |
| 1968 | A Woman's Past | Anna |
| 1968 | Too Late For Tears | Irene Katakouzinou |
| 1968 | The Boulevard of Hate | Sophia |
| 1968 | Mermaids and Rascals | Flora |
| 1969 | When the City Dies | Tzella Razi |
| 1970 | Visibility Zero | Christina Richter |
| 1970 | In the Name of the Law | Tonia |
| 1970 | The Jungle Cities | Nelli Rokou |
| 1972 | Ippocrates and Democracy | Aspasia |
| 1973 | Γυναικοκρατία (Womanocracy) | Helen |
| 1977 | The Hunters | Wife of The Industrialist |
| 1979 | Mother's Invitation | Martha Alexandrou |
| 1980 | Everyone with Their Own Madness | Journalist |
| 1980 | The Hem | Stefania |
| 1980 | The Savage Hunt | Irene |
| 1982 | School Panic | Vicky |
| 1982 | The Gigolo of Athens | Savvina Karra |
| 1984 | Voyage to Cythera | Voula |
| 1987 | The Children of the Swallow | Fotini |
| 1996 | To Liberty! | Nina Horn |

=== Television ===
| Year | Title | Role | Notes |
|---|---|---|---|
| 1971 | 13th Investigative Bureau | Leading role | |
| 1972-1973 | Joyful Sunday | Unknown | |
| 1973 | The Golden Bullet | Herself | Presenter |
| 1981 | The Protagonists | Dora | Leading Role |
| 1983-1984 | Basketball of Knowledge | Herself | Presenter |
| 1984 | Theatrical Evening | Various roles | 2 episodes |
| 1989 | …and Happy Easter! | Herself | Special show, Presenter |
| 1992-1994 | Mother is the only One | Mary Moisiadou | Leading role |
| 1994 | Us and Us | Mary Chrona | 1 episode |
| 2023 | The Other Me: Nemesis | Matrona | 1 episode |

=== Theater ===
| Year | Title | Role | Venue |
|---|---|---|---|
| 1956 | Medea | Member of the Chorus | Touring theatre, National Theatre of Greece |
| 1956 | Clytemnestra | Member of the Chorus | National Theatre of Greece |
| 1957 | Androcles and the Lion | Soldier - Christian Woman - Gladiator - Slave - Servant | National Theatre of Greece |
| 1957 | Iphigenia in Aulis | Member of the Chorus | Ancient Theatre of Epidaurus |
| 1961 | Dangerous Corner | Olwen Peel | Dionysia Theatre |
| 1962 | The Mousetrap | Mollie Ralston | Florida Theatre |
| 1963 | Look Back in Anger | Alison Porter | Diana Theatre |
| 1964 | The Castle | Olga | Veaki Theatre |
| 1965 | To Clothe the Naked | Ersilia Drei | Veaki Theatre |
| 1974 | And Now? What We Are Doing? | Unknown | Minos Theatre |
| 1981 | They're Playing Our Song | Sonia | Kalouta Theatre |

== Awards ==
- Thessaloniki Film Festival Award for Best Actress for The Children of the Swallow, 1987
- Honorary Award of the Hellenic Film Academy, 2021
