= Eternity and a Day =

1998 film directed by Theodoros Angelopoulos

- French-language release poster
- Greek: Μια αιωνιότητα και μια μέρα
- Directed by: Theo Angelopoulos
- Written by: Tonino Guerra; Theo Angelopoulos; Petros Markaris; Giorgio Silvagni
- Produced by: Theo Angelopoulos; Eric Heumann; Giorgio Silvagni
- Starring: Bruno Ganz; Isabelle Renauld; Fabrizio Bentivoglio
- Cinematography: Yorgos Arvanitis; Andreas Sinanos
- Edited by: Yannis Tsitsopoulos
- Music by: Eleni Karaindrou
- Distributed by: Artistic License
- Release dates: 23 May 1998 (Cannes); 3 September 1998 (MWFF); 13 September 1998 (Toronto)
- Running time: 137 minutes
- Country: Greece
- Language: Greek
- Box office: $107,178

Eternity and a Day (Greek: Μια αιωνιότητα και μια μέρα, romanized: Mia aioniótita kai mia méra) is a 1998 Greek drama film directed by Theo Angelopoulos, and starring Bruno Ganz, Isabelle Renauld and Fabrizio Bentivoglio.

The film won the Palme d'Or and the Prize of the Ecumenical Jury at the 1998 Cannes Film Festival. It was selected as the Greek entry for the Best Foreign Language Film at the 71st Academy Awards, but was not accepted as a nominee.

== Plot ==
Alexandros, a middle-aged writer, leaves his seaside apartment in Thessaloniki after learning he has a terminal illness and must enter a hospital the next day to perform more tests. He is trying to get his affairs in order and to find someone who would take care of his dog. He speaks in his mind to his dead wife, Anna, who appears still young to him.

Alexandros hides a young Albanian squeegee kid from the police who are arresting other boys like him at a traffic stop in order to deport them. Later, he pays a visit to his 22-year-old daughter, but he does not tell her of his diagnosis. Instead he gives her some letters written by her mother, which she reads out loud, triggering his memories of the time when their daughter was a newborn at her baby shower. He learns that his daughter and her husband have sold the family's beach house without telling him. Also, they refuse to keep his dog with them.

On his way back, Alexandros meets the immigrant boy again, and witnesses his capture at the hands of human traffickers who try to sell him into illegal adoption. Alexandros infiltrates the clandestine meeting and in a moment of confusion tries to sneak away with the kid but is stopped by the traffickers and must pay what they ask for him. He tries to put the kid on a bus and then a taxi, but he keeps running away, so he decides to take him across the border to Albania himself.

Alexandros sees at the snowy mountain border an eerie barbed wire fence with what seem to be bodies stuck to it. As the pair waits for the gate to open, they have a change of mind about crossing, when the boy admits he has been lying about his life in Albania. The two of them barely escape a border sentry and make it back to Alexandros's automobile.

The boy's perilous existence brings Alexandros out of his stupor and self-pity, and seemingly re-energizes him in his love for a 19th-century Greek poet, Dionysios Solomos, whose unfinished poem he longs to complete. The old man and the boy are connected by fear. The former over what lies ahead for him, and whether his life has had any impact; the latter over the perilous return trip to Albania on a path over the mountains lined with land mines, as well as traffickers.

Alexandros pays a visit to his housekeeper, Ourania. She is manifestly smitten with him, but is in the middle of a wedding party and dances between her son and his bride. The scene plays on until Alexandros interrupts. He leaves the dog with her, and then the dance and music, which had stopped, resume as if nothing had halted them.

The boy goes to the ruins of a hospital, mourning another young boy, Selim, via a candlelight vigil, with dozens of other youths. The pair take a bus trip and encounter all sorts of people, from a tired political protester to an arguing couple to a classical music trio. They also look out the window as a trio of people on bicycles pedal by them, oddly dressed in bright yellow raincoats. The boy departs in the middle of the night, stowing aboard a huge, brightly lit ship whose destination is unknown.

Alexandros enters his old home. He looks about, exits out the back door, and into the sunny past where Anna and other friends are singing. They stop, ask him to join them, then they all dance, and soon, there is only the poet and his wife in motion. Then, she slowly pulls away, and he claims his hearing is gone. He also cannot see her, it seems. He calls out and asks how long tomorrow will be, after he had told her he refuses to go into the hospital as planned. She tells him tomorrow will last eternity and a day.

== Cast ==
- Bruno Ganz as Alexandre
- Isabelle Renauld as Anna
- Fabrizio Bentivoglio as the poet
- Achileas Skevis as the child
- Alexandra Ladikou as Anna's mother
- Despina Bebedelli as Alexandre's mother
- Helene (Eleni) Gerasimidou as Urania
- Iris Chatziantoniou as Alexandre's daughter
- Nikos Kouros as Anna's uncle
- Alekos Oudinotis as Anna's father
- Nikos Kolovos as the doctor

== Soundtrack ==
The score by Eleni Karaindrou was released on the ECM New Series label in 1998.

== Reception ==
On the review aggregator website Rotten Tomatoes, 95% of 22 critics' reviews are positive, with an average rating of 7.3/10. Metacritic, which uses a weighted average, assigned the film a score of 80 out of 100, based on 21 critics, indicating "generally favorable" reviews.

== Accolades ==
List of awards and nominations
Award	Category	Recipients	Result
1998 Cannes Film Festival	Palme d'Or	Theodoros Angelopoulos	Won
1998 Cannes Film Festival	Prize of the Ecumenical Jury	Theodoros Angelopoulos	Won
1998 Greek State Film Awards	Best Film	Theodoros Angelopoulos	Won
1998 Greek State Film Awards	Best Supporting Actress	Eleni Gerasimidou	Won
1998 Greek State Film Awards	Best Director	Theodoros Angelopoulos	Won
1998 Greek State Film Awards	Best Screenplay	Theodoros Angelopoulos	Won
1998 Greek State Film Awards	Best Music	Eleni Karaindrou	Won
1998 Greek State Film Awards	Best Set Decoration	Giorgos Ziakas, Costas Dimitriadis	Won
1998 Greek State Film Awards	Best Costumes Design	Giorgos Patsas	Won

== See also ==
- Infinity plus one
- List of submissions to the 71st Academy Awards for Best Foreign Language Film
- List of Greek submissions for the Academy Award for Best Foreign Language Film
