= Dimitris Poulikakos =

Greek actor and singer

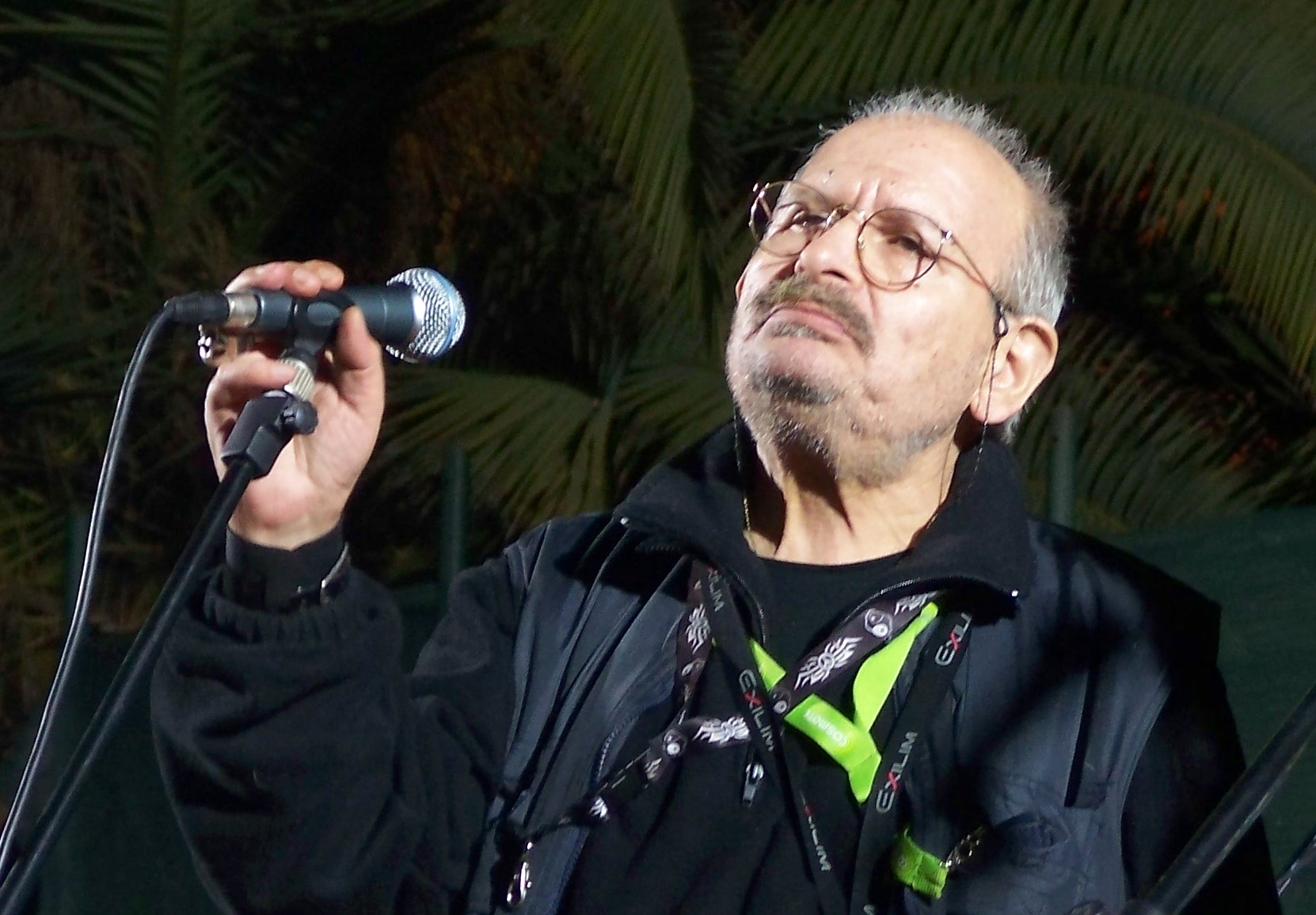

Background information
- Also known as: Theios Nontas, Dr. Polikarpov
- Born: 21 January 1943 (age 83); Patission Street, Athens, Greece
- Genres: Rock blues
- Occupations: singer composer acting
- Years active: 1967–present
- Labels: EMI; MINOS; MBI

Dimitris Poulikakos (Greek: Δημήτρης Πουλικάκος; born 21 January 1943) is a Greek actor and rock singer. He is the leader of the rock band Exadaktylos and a member of the band MGC.

== Filmography ==
Dimitris Poulikakos participated in more than 60 movies

- 1972: Fonissa, I (a.k.a. The Murderess)
- 1972: Aldevaran
- 1975: Kelli miden, To
- 1976: Happy Day
- 1976: Diadikasia (a.k.a. Proceedings)
- 1977: Mia zoi se thymamai na fevgeis
- 1977: Arhontes (T' eihes Gianni, t' eiha panta)
- 1978: Tembelides tis eforis koiladas, Oi (a.k.a. Idlers of the Fertile Valley)
- 1981: Souvliste tous! Etsi tha paroume to kouradokastro (a.k.a. Barbecue Them!)
- 1981: Apenanti, Oi (a.k.a. A Foolish Love)
- 1982: Arpa Colla
- 1982: Reporter, O
- 1982: Aima ton agalmaton, To (a.k.a. The Bleeding Statues)
- 1983: O Drakoulas ton Exarheion (a.k.a. Dracula of Exarcheia) (also Composer)
- 1983: Parexigisi, I (a.k.a. Misunderstanding)
- 1983: Revanche
- 1984: Loufa kai parallagi (a.k.a. Loaf and Camouflage)
- 1984: To kanoun kathe mera
- 1985: Meteoro kai skia (a.k.a. Meteor and Shadow)
- 1985: Kai pali oraioi eimaste
- 1986: Periptosi aftodikias
- 1986: Melissokomos, O (a.k.a. The Beekeeper)
- 1987: Sweet Country (a.k.a. Glykeia patrida) with Jane Alexander, Randy Quaid)
- 1987: Made in Greece
- 1987: Tile-kannivaloi (a.k.a. Telecannibals)
- 1987: Terirem
- 1987: Patris, listeia, oikogeneia
- 1987: Paidia tis Helidonas, Ta (a.k.a. The Children of the Swallow)
- 1987: Bios + politeia (a.k.a. Living Dangerously)
- 1987: ... kai dyo avga Tourkias (a.k.a. Two Turkish Eggs)
- 1988: Fakellos Polk ston aera, O (a.k.a. The Polk File on Air)
- 1989: Oi Aftheretoi (TV Series)
- 1989: Gamos sto Perithorio (a.k.a. A Wedding on the Fringe)
- 1990: Erastes sti mihani tou hronou (a.k.a. Lovers Beyond Time)
- 1991: Meteoro vima tou pelargou, To (a.k.a. The Suspended Step of the Stork) with Marcello Mastroianni, Jeanne Moreau
- 1992: Donusa
- 1994: Gynaika pou epistrefei, I (a.k.a. The Woman Who Comes Back)
- 1994: Spiti stin exohi, To (a.k.a. Country House)
- 1995: Un bruit qui rend fou (a.k.a. The Blue Villa) with Fred Ward, Arielle Dombasle
- 1995: Me ton Orfea ton Avgousto (a.k.a. Orpheus Descending)
- 1995: Tranzito (a.k.a. Transito)
- 1995: Sapounopetra – To hrima sto laimo sas (a.k.a. Sapounopetra)
- 1995: Ftero tis mygas, To (a.k.a. The Wing of the Fly)
- 1998: Rodina akrogialia, Ta (a.k.a. Shores of Twilight)
- 1998: Medousa (a.k.a. Medusa)
- 1999: Thilyki etaireia (a.k.a. Company of Women)
- 2000: Vitsia gynaikon (a.k.a. Women's Vices)
- 2000: Milo tis eridos, To (a.k.a. The Apple of Discord)
- 2000: Epohi ton asevon, I (a.k.a. The Age of Irreverence)
- 2007: Erotika mathimata gia epanastatiki drasi (a.k.a. Love Lessons on Revolutionary Action)
- 2008: Athina – Konstadinoupoli (a.k.a. Athens – Istanbul)

== Discography ==
- 1976: Metafore – ekdrome o Mitsos
- 1979: Crazy Love stou Zografou
- 2004: Adespota Skylia

=== Participations ===
- Rock stories
- 1984: Revans
- 1984: Zorba the Freak
- 1996: Paspartou
- 1998: Oulf!
- 2000: 11
