= Tonino Guerra =

Italian concentration camp survivor, poet, writer and screenwriter (1920–2012)

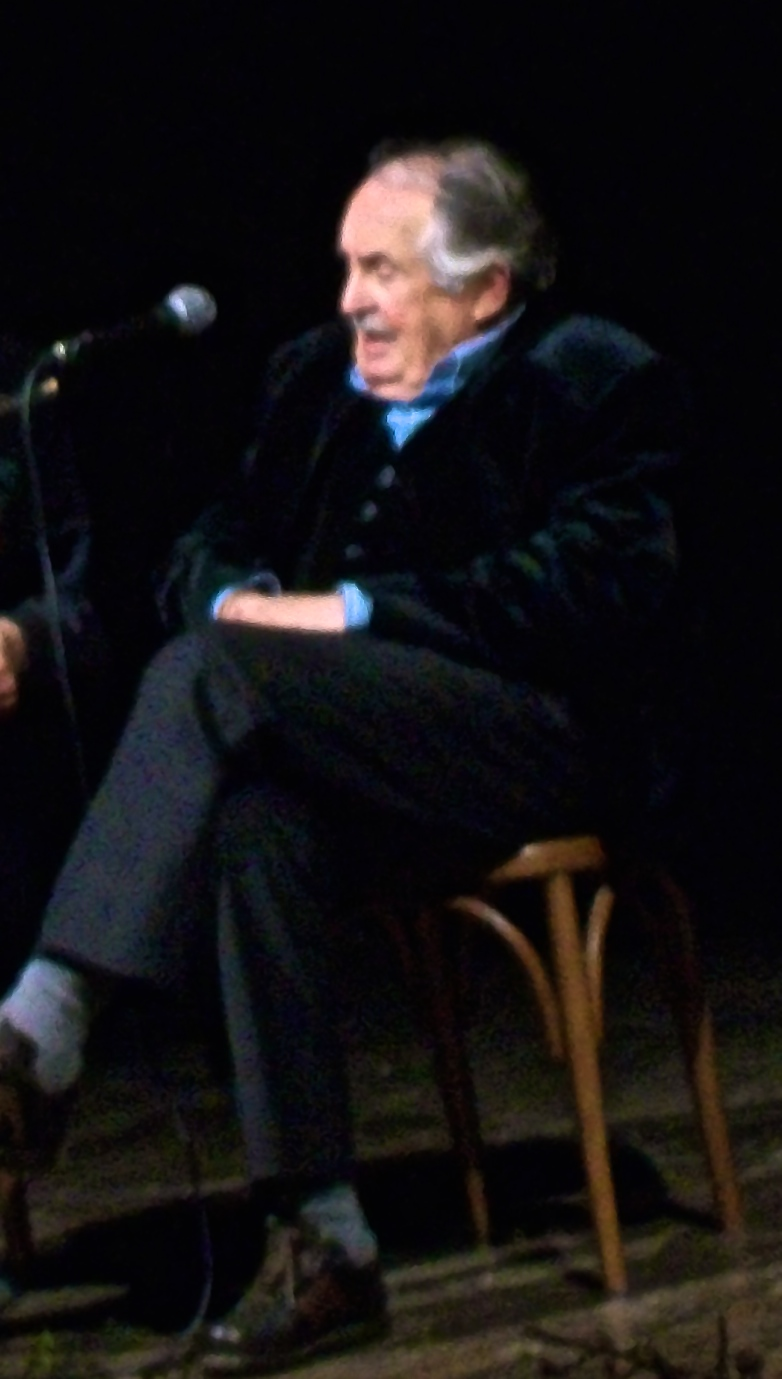
- Guerra in 2011
- Born: Antonio Guerra; 16 March 1920; Santarcangelo di Romagna, Italy
- Died: 21 March 2012 (aged 92); Santarcangelo di Romagna, Italy
- Occupations: Writer, poet, screenwriter

Antonio "Tonino" Guerra (16 March 1920 – 21 March 2012) was an Italian poet, writer and screenwriter who collaborated with some of the most prominent film directors, such as Andrei Tarkovsky, Michelangelo Antonioni, Theo Angelopoulos, Elio Petri and Federico Fellini.

== Life and work ==
Guerra was born in Santarcangelo di Romagna. According to his obituary in The Guardian, Guerra first started writing poetry when interned in a prison camp in Germany, after being rounded up at the age of 22 with other antifascists from Santarcangelo. The Guardian wrote: "To pass the time he told his companions stories: when he came home in 1945 he found a publisher for a book of them, I Scarabocc (Cockroaches, but also 'scribblings')." At 30, he moved to Rome and worked as a schoolteacher. During this time he met Elio Petri, the future director of Investigation of a Citizen Above Suspicion (1970), who worked as assistant to Giuseppe De Santis. Guerra was able to get his first screenwriting credit after he and Petri went to the Abruzzi mountains to find out about wolf-hunting; "Though they discovered that wolf hunters no longer existed, De Santis went ahead anyway with the film, Uomini e Lupi (Men and Wolves, 1957)".

Although a follower of Cesare Zavattini, who essentially defined the style and morals of Italian neorealism, Guerra deviated from his mentor: while Zavattini brought the directors with whom he collaborated over to his own social and moral speculation, Guerra went to the filmmakers and helped them advance their own concept. He worked with such filmmakers as Michelangelo Antonioni, in L'Avventura, La Notte, L'Eclisse, Red Desert, Blowup, Zabriskie Point and Identification of a Woman; Federico Fellini, in Amarcord; Theo Angelopoulos, in Landscape in the Mist, Eternity and a Day and Trilogy: The Weeping Meadow; Andrei Tarkovsky, in Nostalghia and Voyage in Time; and Francesco Rosi, in The Mattei Affair, Lucky Luciano, Illustrious Corpses and Christ Stopped at Eboli.

In 1990, Guerra in collaboration with Giovanni Urbinati to create the exhibition "La Cattedrale dove va a dormire il mare/The Cathedral where the sea goes to sleep." at the deconsecrated church in Budrio near Bologna. In 1995, he was awarded with an Honorable Diploma at the 19th Moscow International Film Festival.

== Selected filmography ==
=== Writer ===
- Piece of the Sky (1959)
- L'avventura (1960)
- La notte (1961)
- The Assassin (1961)
- Numbered Days (1962)
- L'Eclisse (1962)
- Red Desert (1964)
- Marriage Italian Style (1964)
- Casanova 70 (1965)
- Blow-Up (1966)
- Catch As Catch Can (1967)
- Ghosts – Italian Style (1968)
- Dismissed on His Wedding Night (1968)
- In Search of Gregory (1969)
- A Quiet Place in the Country (1969)
- The Voyeur (1970)
- Zabriskie Point (1970)
- The Mattei Affair (1972)
- Lucky Luciano (1973)
- Amarcord (1973)
- Illustrious Corpses (1976)
- Caro Michele (1976)
- Butterfly on the Shoulder (1978)
- Christ Stopped at Eboli (1979)
- The Night of the Shooting Stars (1981)
- Identification of a Woman (1982)
- Voyage in Time (1983)
- Nostalghia (1983)
- And the Ship Sails On (1983)
- Henry IV (1984)
- Voyage to Cythera (1984)
- Ginger and Fred (1985)
- The Beekeeper (1986)
- Chronicle of a Death Foretold (1987)
- Landscape in the Mist (1988)
- Burro (1989)
- The Palermo Connection (1989)
- The Sun Also Shines at Night (1990)
- The Suspended Step of the Stork (1991)
- Beyond the Clouds (1995)
- Ulysses' Gaze (1995)
- Eternity and a Day (1998)
- Tierra del Fuego (2000)
- Trilogy: The Weeping Meadow (2004)
- Bab'Aziz (2005)

=== Actor ===
- Er Più – storia d'amore e di coltello (1971)
- Naissance d'un Golem (1991) - (uncredited)
- Le Chien, le Général et les Oiseaux (2003) - Il generale (voice)
