= Australia (1989 film) =

- Directed by: Jean-Jacques Andrien
- Written by: Jean Gruault; Jacques Audiard; Jean-Jacques Andrien; Marc Rosenberg
- Produced by: Marie-Pascale Osterrieth
- Starring: Fanny Ardant; Jeremy Irons; Tchéky Karyo; Agnès Soral
- Cinematography: Giorgos Arvanitis
- Edited by: Henri Colpi; Christian Dior
- Music by: Nicola Piovani
- Distributed by: UGC Distribution
- Release date: 13 September 1989
- Running time: 118 minutes
- Country: France
- Languages: French; English

Australia is a 1989 film directed by Jean-Jacques Andrien.

== Plot ==
Edouard Pierson, a Belgian-born wool dealer who emigrated to Australia after World War II, returns home to assist his family with their wool business. Edouard was left a single father after his girlfriend died, and when he goes to Belgium he leaves behind a young girl whom his family doesn't know about. He meets a beautiful woman, Jeanne, another single parent, and they develop an intense relationship. Edouard's relationship with his family has its ups and downs, and many secrets are revealed before the movie's conclusion ties everything together.

== Cast ==
- Fanny Ardant as Jeanne Gauthier
- Jeremy Irons as Edouard Pierson
- Tchéky Karyo as Julien Pierson
- Agnès Soral as Agnès Deckers
- Hélène Surgère as Odette Pierson
- Maxime Laloux as François Gauthier
- Patrick Bauchau as André Gauthier
- Danielle Lyttleton as Saturday Pierson
- Dorothy Alison as Doreen Swanson

== Awards ==
- 1989 Venice Film Festival - Golden Osella for Best Cinematography - Giorgos Arvanitis
- 1990 Joseph Plateau Awards - Best Belgian Cinematography - Giorgos Arvanitis
