= Vangelis Kazan =

Greek character actor

Vangelis Kazan (Greek: Βαγγέλης Καζάν) (1936 – 10 March 2008) was a Greek character actor.

== Biography ==
Kazan was born in Nafplion. His career in theater, cinema and television spanned for half a century. He repeatedly collaborated with Theo Angelopoulos and was awarded the Best Actor award at the Thessaloniki Film Festival in 1975 for his part in The Travelling Players. He died in Athens.

Year	Title	Role
1964	Treason	police detective
1968	Girls in the Sun	hotel receptionist
1970	Visibility Zero	Gerasimos
1975	Weak Spot	man with newspaper
1975	The Travelling Players	Aegisthus
1977	The Hunters	Savas
1980	The Man with the Carnation	major Georgios Papadopoulos
1988	Landscape in the Mist	actor
1994	End of an Era	Fotis Vamvakas
