= Vasilis Kolovos =

Greek actor

- Born: 1946 (age 79–80); Petroto, Domokos, Greece
- Occupation: Actor
- Years active: 1971-present

Vasilis Kolovos (Greek: Βασίλης Κολοβός; born 1946) is a Greek actor. He appeared in more than forty films since 1971.

== Filmography ==
Year	Title	Role	Notes
1978	1922		
1988	Landscape in the Mist		
2004	Trilogy: The Weeping Meadow		
