= The Naked Brigade =

1965 film by Maury Dexter

- Directed by: Maury Dexter
- Written by: Albert J. Cohen; Irwin Winehouse; A. Sanford Wolfe
- Produced by: Albert J. Cohen
- Starring: Shirley Eaton; Ken Scott; Mary Chronopoulou
- Cinematography: Aristeidis Karydis-Fuchs
- Edited by: Eleftherios Siaskas
- Music by: Menelaos Theofanidis
- Production company: Boxoffice Attractions
- Distributed by: Universal Pictures
- Release date: April 1, 1965
- Running time: 99 minutes
- Countries: Greece; United States
- Language: English

The Naked Brigade is a 1965 Greek-American war film directed by Maury Dexter and starring Shirley Eaton, Ken Scott and Mary Chronopoulou. The screenplay concerns a British girl who becomes trapped on Crete during World War II.

== Plot ==
During the German invasion of Crete in 1941, a British girl is trapped on the island. Eventually she joins the resistance fighters against the Nazis.

== Cast ==
- Shirley Eaton as Diana Forsythe
- Ken Scott as Christo
- Mary Chronopoulou as Katina
- John Holland as Maj. Hamilton
- Sonia Zoidou as Athena
- Kostas Baladimas as Manolakakis
- Gikas Biniaris as Stavros Karrayiannis
- Christoforos Himaras as Spyros Karrayiannis
- Patrick Kavanaugh as Lt. Bentley
- Sokratis Korres as Lefteris Karrayiannis
- Karl Nurk as Professor Forsythe
- Nikos Papakonstantinou as Major Heilmann
- Clive Russell as Cpl. Reade
- Aris Vlachopoulos as Father Nicholas
- Eleni Zafeiriou as Sofia
- Zannino as Yannis Karrayiannis

== Production ==
The film was shot in Crete.

== See also ==
- List of American films of 1965
