= Giorgos Arvanitis =

Greek cinematographer

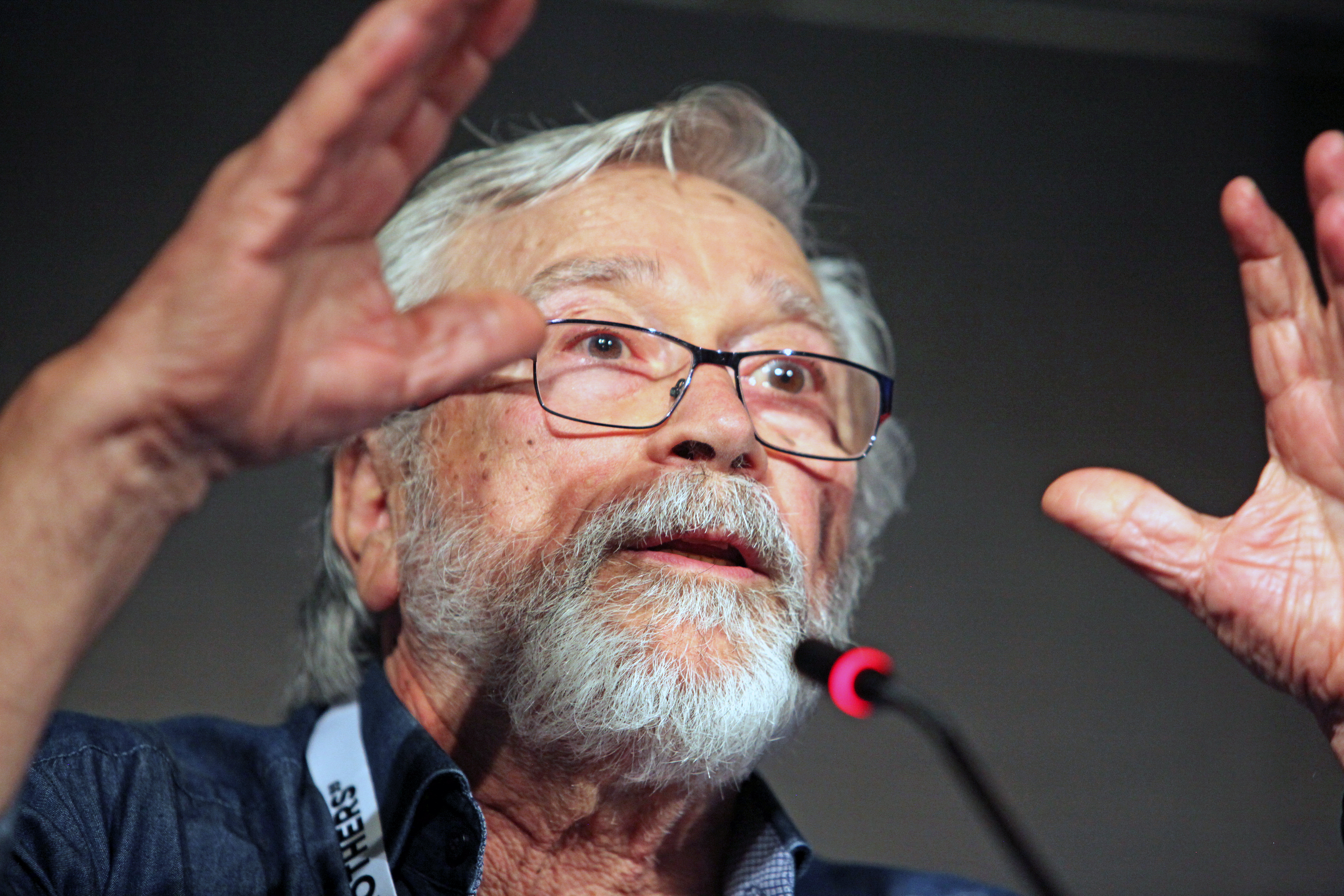
- Giorgos Arvanitis at the Manaki Brothers Film Festival in Bitola in 2019
- Born: Giorgos Arvanitis; Dilofo, Makrakomi, Phthiotis, Greece
- Occupation: Cinematographer
- Years active: 1967–present

Giorgos (or Yorgos) Arvanitis (Greek: Γιώργος Αρβανίτης) is a Greek cinematographer.

== Early life and education ==
Giorgos (or Yorgos) Arvanitis was born in the village of Dilofo, Makrakomi, Phthiotis, Greece.

Having received an education as an electrician in the construction sector, he started working in the film industry in his early 20s, advancing from 2nd camera assistant to finally become a director of photography.

== Career ==
Arvanitis has been an important figure in the Greek film industry, having worked on many films produced by Finos Films. In 1968, he worked on Theo Angelopoulos's first short film Εκπομπή (Broadcast). Since then, he has worked in every single one of Angelopoulos' movies, including award-winning Eternity and a Day (Palme d'or, Cannes 1998), except for the very last trilogy he was shooting (Trilogy: The Weeping Meadow, The Dust of Time, The Other Sea).

During his career, his has worked with some of the greatest Greek directors such as Dinos Katsouridis, Pantelis Voulgaris, Michael Cacoyannis, and Jules Dassin.

In 1989, he moved to France, looking for a brighter future at a time when the total number of Greek movies was in decline.

In 1989 he received the Golden Osella for Best Cinematography at the Venice International Film Festival for the movie Australia directed by Jean-Jacques Adrien. Since then he has worked with directors such as Volker Schlöndorff, Jean-Pierre and Luc Dardenne, Marco Bellocchio, Goran Paskaljevic, Marco Ferreri, Bruno Podalydès, Agnieszka Holland, Amos Gitai, and Nikos Panayiotopoulos.

== Memberships ==
He is a member of the Association Française des directeurs de la photographie Cinématographique.

== Awards and honours ==
He has received numerous prizes for his work including (non-exhaustive list):

- Thessaloniki Film Festival, Greek cinema awards, Best photography for Nyfes (2004), Doxombous (1988), Mia toso makrini apousia (1985), O Thiassos (1974), Meres tou 36 (1972), Anaparastassi (1970)
- Golden Bayard at the Namur International Festival of French-Speaking Film for Faraw! (1997)
- Nomination for the Camerimage Golden Grog for 'Ulysses' Gaze' (1995) and for Eternity and a Day together with Andreas Sinanos (1998)
- Golden Kikito at the Gramado Film Festival for Il Sogno della farfalla (1994)
- Osella for Best Cinematography at the Venice Film Festival (Mostra Internazionale d'Arte Cinematografica) for Australia (1989)
- Best Photography award, Chicago Film Festival for Topio stin omichli (1988)
- Golden Camera 300 for life achievement at the Manaki Brothers Film Festival (2019)

== Filmography ==
- 1967 : Oi Thalassies oi Hadres
- 1970 : Reconstitution
- 1970 : Ipolochagos Natassa
- 1972 : Days of '36
- 1975 : Assault on Agathon
- 1975 : The Travelling Players
- 1977 : Iphigenia
- 1977 : The Hunters
- 1978 : A Dream of Passion
- 1980 : Alexander the Great
- 1983 : Homecoming Song
- 1984 : Voyage to Cythera
- 1986 : The Beekeeper
- 1988 : Landscape in the Mist
- 1989 : Australia
- 1991 : The Suspended Step of the Stork
- 1991 : Voyager
- 1994 : The Butterfly's Dream
- 1995 : Ulysses' Gaze
- 1995 : Total Eclipse
- 1997 : Bent
- 1997 : Port Djema
- 1998 : Eternity and a Day
- 1998 : Train of Life
- 1999 : Innocent
- 1999 : Romance
- 2001 : Fat Girl
- 2002 : Kedma
- 2004 : Process
- 2004 : Brides
- 2004 : Anatomy of Hell
- 2005 : See You at Regis Debray
- 2005 : The Great Ecstasy of Robert Carmichael
- 2006 : A Crime
- 2007 : The Last Mistress
- 2008 : Dorothy Mills
- 2015 : Graziella, directed by Mehdi Charef, starring Rossy de Palma
- 2019 : Adults in the Room
- 2019 : Fanny Lye Deliver'd
