= Giovanni Urbinati =

Italian ceramist and sculptor (1946–2023)

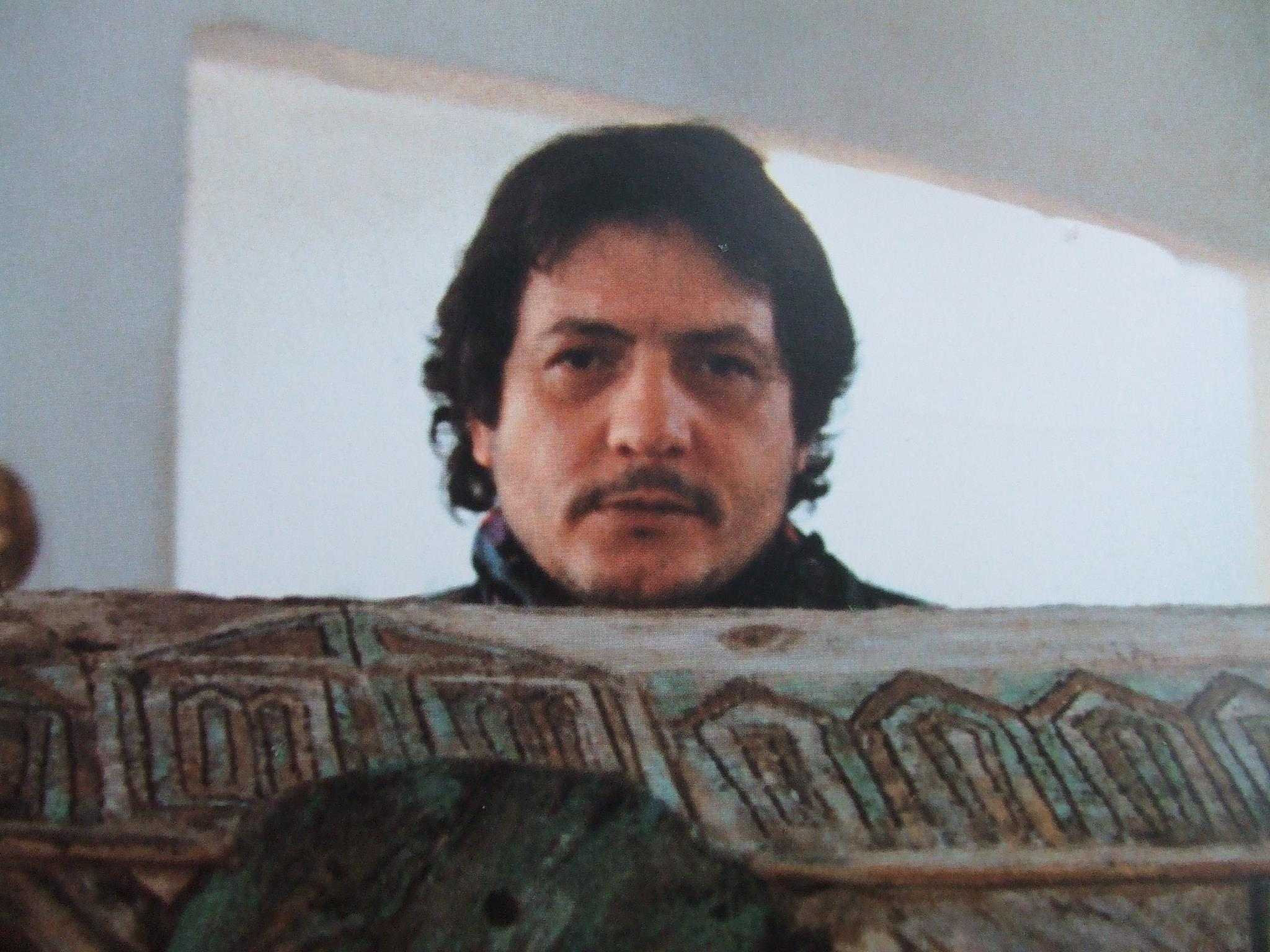
- Urbinati in 2012
- Born: Gio Urbinati; 17 August 1946; Rimini, Italy
- Died: 2 May 2023 (aged 76); Rimini, Italy
- Known for: Sculpture
- Website: http://www.giourbinati.it

Giovanni Urbinati (17 August 1946 – 2 May 2023) was an Italian ceramist and sculptor. He lived in Rimini, and he was exhibited both in Italy and abroad.

== Biography ==
Giovanni Urbinati started the ceramist craft in 1965 at the atelier “Ceramica Stella Alpina”. In 1969 he opened his first workshop in Rimini and he started his research on materials, glazes and luster. Gio' moulded and fired any kind of earth: clay, grass, porcelain and even earth from his garden.

In 1988, he met Tonino Guerra and since then they started a collaboration that brought them to create 1990 the exhibition “La Cattedrale dove va a dormire il mare/The Cathedral where the sea goes to sleep” at the deconsecrated church in Budrio near Bologna.

In 1991, Gio' made in Bascio Alta, a village close to Pennabilli, the “Petrified garden” by a Tonino Guerra idea. This project consisted of seven ceramic carpets and each one was dedicated to a historical figure that was important in the Alta Valmarecchia area. Again, in collaboration with Tonino Guerra in 1995 he made the ceramic sculpture “ The Arch of tale for the eyes of childhood” inside the garden of forgotten fruits of Pennabilli.

In 2003, he made the “ Grande foglia/ The Big leaf” for Palazzo Mareo, the palace designed by Massimiliano Fuksas in Rimini Marina Centro.

In 2011, he exhibited in the Museum of Rimini his thirty years of production.

The work of Giovanni Urbinati is exhibited at the Art Gallery Nera Contemporanea of Bologna, at the Ceramic International Museum of Faenza, Civic Museum of Gualdo Tadino, Civic Museum of Pesaro, Ceramic Art International Museum of Castelli in Abruzzo and at the Vatican Museum.

Urbinati died on 2 May 2023, at the age of 76.
