= 17th European Film Awards =

2004 film awards ceremony in Spain

- Date: December 11, 2004
- Site: Forum Convention Center, Barcelona, Spain
- Hosted by: Maria de Medeiros, Juanjo Puigcorbé
- Organized by: European Film Academy

Highlights
- Best Picture: Head-On
- Best Direction: Alejandro Amenábar; The Sea Inside
- Best Actor: Javier Bardem; The Sea Inside
- Best Actress: Imelda Staunton; Vera Drake
- Most awards: Head-On and The Sea Inside (2)
- Most nominations: Head-On (7)

Television coverage
- Channel: Arte

The 17th European Film Awards were presented on December 11, 2004 in Barcelona, Spain. The winners were selected by the members of the European Film Academy.

== Awards ==
=== Best Film ===
English title	Original title	Director(s)	Country
Head-On	Gegen die Wand	Fatih Akın	Germany, Turkey
A Hole in My Heart	Ett hål i mitt hjärta	Lukas Moodysson	Sweden, Denmark
Bad Education	La mala educación	Pedro Almodóvar	Spain
The Chorus	Les choristes	Christophe Barratier	France, Switzerland
The Sea Inside	Mar adentro	Alejandro Amenábar	Spain, France, Italy
Vera Drake		Mike Leigh	United Kingdom, France

=== Best Director ===
Nominee(s)	English title	Original title
Alejandro Amenábar	The Sea Inside	Mar adentro
Fatih Akın	Head-On	Gegen die Wand
Pedro Almodóvar	Bad Education	La mala educación
Nimród Antal	Kontroll	
Agnès Jaoui	Look at Me	Comme une image
Theo Angelopoulos	Trilogy: The Weeping Meadow	Τριλογία: Το Λιβάδι που Δακρύζει

=== Best Screenwriter ===
Nominee(s)	English title	Original title
Agnès Jaoui and Jean-Pierre Bacri	Look at Me	Comme une image
Pedro Almodóvar	Bad Education	La mala educación
Fatih Akın	Head-On	Gegen die Wand
Paul Laverty	Ae Fond Kiss....	
Jean-Luc Godard	Our Music	Notre musique
Alejandro Amenábar	The Sea Inside	Mar adentro

=== Best Actor ===
Nominee(s)	English title	Original title
Javier Bardem	The Sea Inside	Mar adentro
Bruno Ganz	Downfall	Der Untergang
Birol Ünel	Head-On	Gegen die Wand
Bohdan Stupka	Our Own	Свои
Gérard Jugnot	The Chorus	Les choristes
Daniel Brühl	The Edukators	Die fetten Jahre sind vorbei

=== Best Actress ===
Nominee(s)	English title	Original title
Imelda Staunton	Vera Drake	
Valeria Bruni Tedeschi	5x2	
Asi Levi	Avanim	אבנים
Penélope Cruz	Don't Move	Non ti muovere
Sibel Kekilli	Head-On	Gegen die Wand
Sarah Adler	Our Music	Notre musique

=== European Discovery ===
English title	Original title	Director(s)	Country
A Children's Story	Certi bambino	Andrea and Antonio Frazzi	Italy, France
A Common Thread	Brodeuses	Éléonore Faucher	France
Kroko		Sylke Enders	Germany
Or (My Treasure)	אור	Keren Yedaya	Israel, France
A Wonderful Night in Split	Ta divna splitska noć	Arsen Anton Ostojić	Croatia
Harvest Time	Время жатвы	Marina Razbezhkina	Russia

=== Best Cinematographer ===
Nominee(s)	English title	Original title
Eduardo Serra	Girl with a Pearl Earring	
José Luis Alcaine	Bad Education	La mala educación
Lajos Koltai	Being Julia	
Alwin Kuchler	Code 46	
Javier Aguirresarobe	The Sea Inside	Mar adentro
Andreas Sinanos	Trilogy: The Weeping Meadow	Τριλογία: Το Λιβάδι που Δακρύζει

=== Best Composer ===
Nominee(s)	English title	Original title
Bruno Coulais	The Chorus	Les choristes
Alberto Iglesias	Bad Education	La mala educación
Free Association	Code 46	
Alexandre Desplat	Girl with a Pearl Earring	
Stephen Warbeck	The Alzheimer Case	De zaak Alzheimer
Eleni Karaindrou	Trilogy: The Weeping Meadow	Τριλογία: Το Λιβάδι που Δακρύζει
