= Landscape in the Mist =

1988 Greek coming-of-age tragedy road film by Theo Angelopoulos

- Film poster
- Directed by: Theo Angelopoulos
- Written by: Theo Angelopoulos; Tonino Guerra; Thanassis Valtinos
- Produced by: Theo Angelopoulos; Eric Heumann; Amedeo Pagani; Stéphane Sorlat
- Starring: Michalis Zeke; Tania Palaiologou; Stratos Tzortzoglou
- Cinematography: Giorgos Arvanitis
- Edited by: Yannis Tsitsopoulos
- Music by: Eleni Karaindrou
- Production companies: Th. Angelopoulos; Paradis Films; ET1; Basicinematografica
- Distributed by: New Yorker Films
- Release dates: 10 September 1988 (Greece); 14 September 1990 (United States)
- Running time: 126 minutes
- Countries: Greece; France; Italy
- Language: Greek

Landscape in the Mist (Greek: Τοπίο στην ομίχλη, translit.Topío stín omíchli) is a 1988 Greek coming-of-age tragedy road film co-written and directed by Theo Angelopoulos. The film was selected as the Greek entry for the Best Foreign Language Film at the 62nd Academy Awards, but was not accepted as a nominee. A critics' poll by the Village Voice included it in the 100 Best Films of the 20th Century list. The film is the third installment in Angelopoulos' Trilogy of Silence, following Voyage to Cythera (1984) and The Beekeeper (1986). Since then it has been regarded as Angelopoulos' greatest masterpiece, one of the best films of 1988, of the 80s, of the 20th century, and one of the greatest and best Greek films of all time.

== Plot ==
Pubescent Voula (Tania Palaiologou) and her five-year-old brother Alexandros (Michalis Zeke) want to see their father, whom they have never met before. Their mother tells them he lives in Germany and so Voula and Alexandros one day secretly leave their home to find him. They go to the Athens Railway Station and try to use the Germany Express, but are removed from the train for not having a ticket. A police officer takes them to a distant uncle, who convinces the officer that the children do not have a father in Germany. He informs him that their mother lied to them, to prevent them from knowing the truth: that they have different fathers and are simply the results of one-night stands. Although Voula and Alexandros eavesdrop on the conversation, they still believe their mother and believe the uncle is lying. A blizzard suddenly hits the village, diverting the attention of the adults, and the children manage to escape.

They continue their journey on foot and eventually meet a young man named Orestis (Stratos Tzortzoglou), who broke down with his bus. He offers to take them with him, and the children accept the offer. Orestis is the driver of a traveling theater troupe playing a piece about Greek history. Recently the troupe has been struggling with declining audience numbers, due to people searching for easier distraction.

As the path of Orestis splits from theirs, the children leave the troupe and look for different means of transportation to Germany. They manage to find a truck driver (Vassilis Kolovos), willing to take them with him. Later, while Alexandros is asleep, the driver rapes Voula, and flees afterwards, shocked by his own actions. Alexandros and Voula soon reach another train station, where they again try to travel by train. When they spot the ticket inspector, they escape just in time before being caught. They bump into Orestis again, who takes them with him on his motorcycle. Meanwhile, Orestis' theater troupe breaks up and the members begin to sell their various requisites. Orestis takes Voula and Alexandros to an empty beach cafe and they walk the promenade with him. Suddenly, the children witness a huge marble hand held by a helicopter emerge from the sea. The index finger of the hand is broken off.

Due to his impending military service, Orestis is forced to sell his motorcycle. He later meets the buyer again in a bar, and it is implied that he has sexual relations with him. Voula is disappointed in Orestis, having developed a crush in him herself, and the children leave again. Orestis later searches for them, and finds them on a deserted, newly constructed highway section. He takes Voula into his arms and starts consoling the crying girl: "The first time, it's always as if you're dying." They break up with Orestis again, this time for good. At another train station, a soldier gives Voula money to buy train tickets and the children again board a train for Germany. They exit shortly before the passport control at the border. Outside, they realize that the border is formed by a river, and use a small boat to cross it. Suddenly, shots are fired by border guards and a tree begins to emerge from the fog. As the fog begins to clear, Voula and Alexandros run for the tree and embrace it.

== Themes ==
The film frames a pilgrimage toward an absent father as a myth-versus-reality odyssey, using the children’s quest to probe disillusionment, memory, and the collapse of protective fictions in late‑20th‑century Greece.

Absence and “silence” recur as structuring ideas: missing parents, off‑screen authority figures (the unseen patriarch/grandfather), and long, contemplative takes that render power distant yet determining in the children’s lives.

Loss of innocence is central: the journey’s coming‑of‑age arc passes through predation and trauma yet resists sensationalism, with Angelopoulos staging violence in ellipsis to center aftermath, memory, and the siblings’ fragile resilience.

The traveling theatre and recurring civic/industrial spaces (stations, highways, ports) turn the road movie into a meditation on Greek history, collective memory, and modernity’s alienation, echoing Angelopoulos’s earlier engagement with troupe-as-Greece allegory.

Mythic and symbolic images punctuate realism—the giant marble hand with a broken index finger, the sea, fog, and the final tree—signaling a search for orientation and purpose amid historical drift and personal upheaval.

Religious and existential undertones (journey, borders, and the “promised” father) are refracted through the siblings’ perspective, so the odyssey reads as both a national allegory and a child’s metaphysical awakening at the edge of Europe’s frontiers.

== Cast ==
- Michalis Zeke as Alexandros
- Tania Palaiologou as Voula
- Stratos Tzortzoglou as Orestis
- Vassilis Kolovos as truck driver
- Ilias Logothetis as Seagull
- Michael Giannatos as train station guardian
- Toula Stathopoulou as woman in police station
- Gerasimos Skiadaressis as soldier
- Dimitris Kaberidis as uncle
- Tassos Palatzidis as train conductor

== Production ==
Angelopoulos stated he once read in the newspaper about two children embarking on a journey to Germany to find their father. He was so impressed by this strong desire to find the father, that the idea of producing a film about it came to his mind. Landscape in the Mist was Angelopoulos' first film to be distributed in the United States, being distributed by New Yorker Films.

Orestis and his traveling theater troupe are a reference to Angelopoulos' earlier film The Travelling Players (1975).

=== Soundtrack ===
The soundtrack, containing traces of romantic music and stressed by the oboe, was composed by Eleni Karaindrou. Karaindrou stated the impetuous children strongly reminded her of the romantic escapes from earlier times, which is why she wanted the soundtrack to contain traces of Mendelssohn and Franck. When it came to the selection of the fitting instrument, she chose the oboe, because it is romantic and screams at the same time.

== Reception ==
On the review aggregator website Rotten Tomatoes, 71% of 14 critics' reviews are positive, with an average rating of 6.8/10.

=== Accolades ===
Year	Award	Category	Result
1988	45th Venice International Film Festival	Silver Lion	Won
1988	45th Venice International Film Festival	Prize of the Students of the La Sapienza University	Won
1988	45th Venice International Film Festival	OCIC Award	Won
1989	2nd European Film Awards	Best Film	Won
1989	39th Berlin International Film Festival	InterFilm Award	Won

== See also ==
- List of submissions to the 62nd Academy Awards for Best Foreign Language Film
- List of Greek submissions for the Academy Award for Best Foreign Language Film
