= Ulysses' Gaze =

1995 Greek war drama film

- DVD cover
- Directed by: Theo Angelopoulos
- Written by: Theo Angelopoulos; Tonino Guerra; Petros Markaris; Giorgio Silvagni; Kain Tsitseli
- Based on: Odyssey by Homer
- Produced by: Phoebe Economopoulos; Eric Heumann; Giorgio Silvagni
- Starring: Harvey Keitel; Maia Morgenstern; Erland Josephson
- Cinematography: Giorgos Arvanitis; Andreas Sinanos
- Edited by: Giannis Tsitsopoulos; Takis Koumoundouros
- Music by: Eleni Karaindrou
- Production companies: Greek Film Centre; MEGA Channel; Paradis Films; La Générale d'Images; La Sept Cinéma
- Distributed by: Roissy Films
- Release date: 13 September 1995 (Cannes)
- Running time: 176 minutes
- Countries: Greece; Albania; Serbia; Romania; United Kingdom; Germany; Bosnia; France; Germany
- Languages: English; Greek; Bulgarian; Albanian; Serbian; Romanian; Kurdish; Macedonian; German
- Box office: $42,202

Ulysses' Gaze (Greek: Το βλέμμα του Οδυσσέα, translit. To Vlemma tou Odyssea) is a 1995 internationally co-produced war drama film directed by Theo Angelopoulos, loosely based on Homer's epic poem Odyssey, and starring Harvey Keitel, Maia Morgenstern and Erland Josephson.

The film was selected as the Greek entry for the Best Foreign Language Film at the 68th Academy Awards but it was not nominated.

== Plot ==
Successful Greek filmmaker A (Harvey Keitel), returns to Greece. He has come to participate in a screening of one of his earlier films and to begin a personal journey across the Balkans. After the screening is disrupted by local ideological conflict, A takes a taxi from Greece to Albania. Ostensibly A is searching for 3 undeveloped reels of film shot by the Manaki brothers. The mysterious reels could predate the brother's first film, The Weavers, which is believed to be the first film shot in the Balkans.

A's journey fuses his own memories, the experiences of the Manaki brothers, and contemporary images of the Balkans. A drifts from Albania to North Macedonia, Bulgaria, Romania and Serbia. He travels on a train, a barge laden with a statue of Lenin (Polyphemus) and eventually a row boat. Though A makes some acquaintances along the way, he never lingers. His search for the roots of cinema, memory, and the Balkan identity pull him inevitably towards decay and death.

A eventually travels to the besieged Sarajevo. He meets Ivo Levy (Erland Josephson), the curator of an underground cinema archive who had attempted to develop the missing reels before the war. A convinces Levy to continue his work with the reels. The film ends on a rare foggy day in Sarajevo. Ironically the fog protects locals from snipers and gives the city a rare chance to flourish. A explores the city with Levy's family. Near the river the family encounters military personnel and they are executed.

== Cast ==
- Harvey Keitel as A
- Maia Morgenstern as Woman In A's Home Town (Penelope) / Kali (Calypso) / Widow (Circe) / Naomi (Nausicaa)
- Erland Josephson as Ivo Levy
- Thanassis Veggos as Taxi Driver
- Yorgos Michalakopoulos as Nikos
- Dora Volanaki as The Old Lady In Albania
- Mania Papadimitriou as A's Mother

== Production ==
Ulysses' Gaze is part of Angelopoulos' trilogy on borders, his first film made outside of Greece. The film shown at the beginning was inspired by a screening of Angelopoulos' earlier The Suspended Step of the Stork.

The dialog played over loudspeakers in the town square was spoken by Marcello Mastroianni. Gian Maria Volonté died during filming, and was replaced by Erland Josephson. The film is dedicated to Volonté's memory.

=== Music ===
Eleni Karaindrou composed the film score, which was released through ECM in 1995.

Featuring:

- Kim Kashkashian – viola
- Vangelis Christopoulos – oboe
- Andreas Tsekourad – accordion
- Socratis Anthis – trumpet
- Vangelis Skouras – French Horn
- Christos Sfetsas – violoncello
- Georgia Voulvi – voice
- Lefteris Chalkiadakis – conductor
- Manfred Eicher - producer

Track listing

Side one
No.	Title	Length
1.	"Ulysses’ Theme"	1:25
2.	"Litany Variation I"	3:12
3.	"Ulysses’ Theme Variation I"	1:27
4.	"Woman’s Theme"	1:09
5.	"Ulysses’ Theme Variation II"	1:11
6.	"Ulysses’ Theme Variation III"	1:33
7.	"The River"	4:57
8.	"Ulysses’ Theme"	2:11
9.	"Ulysses’ Theme, Litany"	6:54
10.	"Ulysses’ Gaze"	17:02
11.	"Byzantine Psalm"	1:12
12.	"Ulysses’ Theme Variation IV"	1:32
13.	"Ulysses’ Theme Variation V"	1:30
14.	"Ulysses’ Theme Variation VI"	3:33
15.	"Ulysses’ Theme, Lento, Largo"	5:29
16.	"Litany Variation II"	3:29
17.	"Ulysses’ Theme Variation VII"	1:31
Total length:		59:27

== Accolades ==
- Grand Jury Prize - 1995 Cannes Film Festival
- Critics Award 1995 - European Film Academy
- All-TIME 100 Movies - TIME magazine
- The Top 100 Films of All Time - The Moving Arts Film Journal

== See also ==
- List of submissions to the 68th Academy Awards for Best Foreign Language Film
- List of Greek submissions for the Academy Award for Best Foreign Language Film
