= The Suspended Step of the Stork =

- Greek release poster.
- Directed by: Theo Angelopoulos
- Written by: Theo Angelopoulos; Tonino Guerra, et al
- Produced by: Theo Angelopoulos
- Starring: Marcello Mastroianni; Jeanne Moreau; Gregory Patrikareas; Gerasimos Skiadaresis; Christoforos Nezer; Dimitris Poulikakos
- Cinematography: Giorgos Arvanitis; Andreas Sinanos
- Music by: Eleni Karaindrou
- Release date: 4 December 1991 (France)
- Running time: 143 minutes; 126 minutes (Greece)
- Country: Greece
- Language: Greek

The Suspended Step of the Stork (Greek: Το Mετέωρο Bήμα Tου Πελαργού, translit. To Meteoro Vima Tou Pelargou) is a 1991 Greek film directed by Theodoros Angelopoulos. It was entered into the 1991 Cannes Film Festival.

== Cast ==
- Marcello Mastroianni as Missing Politician
- Jeanne Moreau as The Woman
- Gregory Patrikareas as Alexandre the Reporter (as Gregory Karr)
- Ilias Logothetis as Colonel
- Dora Hrisikou as The Girl
- Vassilis Bouyiouklakis as Production Manager
- Dimitris Poulikakos as Chief Photographer
- Gerasimos Skiadaressis as Waiter
- Tasos Apostolou as Perchman
- Akis Sakellariou as Sound Operator
- Athinodoros Prousalis as Hotel-keeper
- Mihalis Giannatos as Shopkeeper
- Christoforos Nezer as Parliament's President
- Yilmaz Hassan as Hanged Man
- Benjamin Ritter as Sound Operator

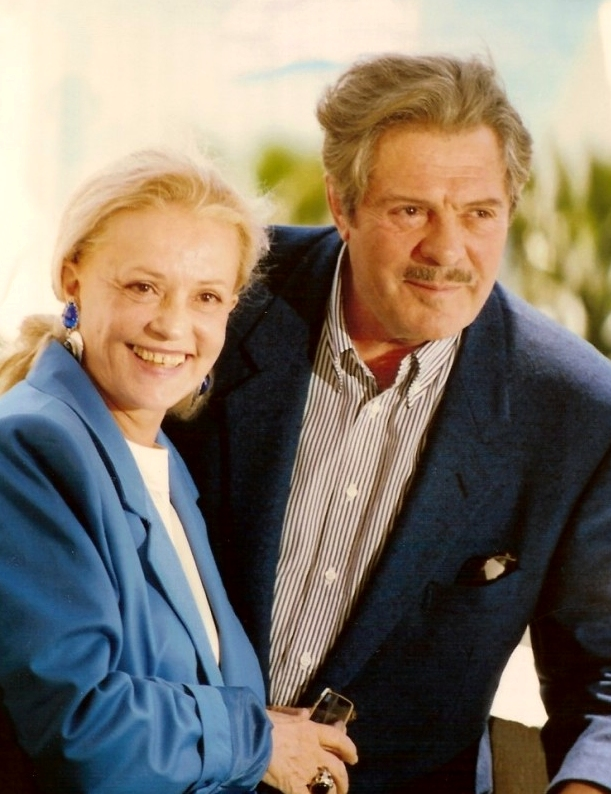
Jeanne Moreau and Marcello Mastroianni promoting the film at the 1991 Cannes Film Festival.

== Plot ==
A journalist (Gregory Patrick Karr) is in a town on the border of Greece where refugees await approval of their papers. He notices an old man (Marcello Mastroianni) whom he suspects is a famous politician who, years ago, disappeared without a trace. He works to uncover the man's story, meeting one of his old lovers (Jeanne Moreau) in the process.

== Themes ==
The film explores the concept of borders, specifically in relation to the history of the Balkans. In The films of Theo Angelopoulos: A Cinema of Contemplation, Andrew Horton writes that the images in Suspended Step "force us to meditate, in a clearer light, on the concept of borders and the territories-geographical, cultural, political, and personal-they lock in and out." He likens the structure of the film to that of Citizen Kane, noting that in Angelopoulos' film the reporter is a more individualized character. In Suspended Step, the journalist does not discover his "Rosebud", but rather gains an appreciation of the possibility of a new humanism in the process of border crossing. The final shot of the reporter watching phone lines being built embodies this idea, "offering the healing touch of movement beyond boundaries."

== Reception ==
New York Times critic Caryn James noted that although The Suspended Step of the Stork has "all the elements of a first-rate Angelopoulos film", it suffers from a "bland, banal" protagonist that "dissolves suspense wherever he turns." Though she offers praise for Mastroianni's performance, James refers to the film as "uneven" and "strained".
