= Eva Kotamanidou =

Greek actress (1936–2020)

Eva Kotamanidou (Greek: Εύα Κοταμανίδου) was a Greek actress.

Born on 16 March 1936 in Nea Filadelfeia, Athens, she became most known for O Thiassos (1975), Topio stin omichli (1988) and Alexander the Great (1980). She died on 26 November 2020, aged 84. In the elections of June and November 1989, she was elected as a member of the Parliament of Athens with the Synaspismos party. In the elections of May and June 2012, she was a candidate for the State Parliament with the Democratic Left.
