= Voyage to Cythera =

- Directed by: Theodoros Angelopoulos
- Written by: Theodoros Angelopoulos; Tonino Guerra; Thanassis Valtinos
- Produced by: Yorgos Samiotis
- Starring: Manos Katrakis
- Cinematography: Yorgos Arvanitis
- Edited by: Yorgos Triandafyllou
- Music by: Eleni Karaindrou
- Release date: 21 April 1984 (Greece)
- Running time: 137 minutes
- Country: Greece
- Language: Greek

Voyage to Cythera (Greek: Ταξίδι στα Κύθηρα, translit. Taxidi sta Kythira) is a 1984 Greek drama film directed by Theodoros Angelopoulos, and starring Manos Katrakis.

It was entered into the 1984 Cannes Film Festival, where it won the FIPRESCI Prize and the award for Best Screenplay, where it was also nominated for the Palme D'or.

== Plot ==
An old communist returning to Greece after 32 years in the Soviet Union is disillusioned with the state of things.

== Cast ==
- Manos Katrakis as Spyros
- Mary Chronopoulou as Voula
- Dionysis Papagiannopoulos as Antonis
- Dora Volanaki as Katerina
- Giulio Brogi as Alexandros
- Giorgos Nezos as Panagiotis
- Athinodoros Prousalis as chief of police
- Michael Giannatos as police officer

== Reception ==
Richard Bernstein of The New York Times was unfavorable toward the work; he stated that there were "extraordinary scenes", but argued that "when the end comes, the viewer is left [...] with the vague unsettled feeling that, aside from gaining the knowledge that exile is emptiness, two and a half hours in the presence of much onscreen joylessness has produced little satisfaction." Bernstein contended that Voyage to Cythera is "like a slightly too long allegory whose moral you just don't get." A reviewer for Time Out was mixed, writing, "The first half of the film [...] is suffused with that peculiar melancholy which Angelopoulos has made entirely his own. One begins to lose the thread in the second half, however, when the old man and his wife are cast adrift on a symbolic voyage to Cythera, birthplace of Aphrodite".

Other critics have praised the film. In the fifth edition of The New Biographical Dictionary of Film, David Thomson wrote that the "beauty of the film has seldom been equaled". In an article for the British Film Institute, Christina Newland included Voyage to Cythera in her list of 10 great Greek films. Matthew Thrift also lauded the trilogy of which the film is a part, writing that all three films "see Angelopoulos at the height of his creative powers". In the book A History of Greek Cinema, Vrasidas Karalis referred to Voyage to Cythera as one of the best films of its decade.
