= The Travelling Players =

- Theatrical poster
- Directed by: Theodoros Angelopoulos
- Written by: Theodoros Angelopoulos
- Produced by: Giorgis Samiotis
- Starring: Eva Kotamanidou; Aliki Georgouli; Vangelis Kazan; Stratos Pahis; Maria Vassiliou; Petros Zarkadis; Kiriakos Katrivanos; Giannis Fyrios; Nina Papazaphiropoulous; Alekos Boubis; Grigoris Evangelatos; Kosta Stiliaris
- Cinematography: Giorgos Arvanitis
- Edited by: Takis Davlopoulos; Giorgos Triandafyllou
- Music by: Loukianos Kilaidonis
- Distributed by: Papalios Productions
- Release dates: 12 May 1975 (Cannes); 13 October 1975
- Running time: 230 minutes
- Country: Greece
- Languages: Greek; German; English

The Travelling Players (Greek: Ο Θίασος, translit. O Thiasos, "The Troupe") is a 1975 Greek historical drama film written and directed by Theodoros Angelopoulos that traces the history of mid-20th-century Greece from 1939 to 1952.

Many critics have described The Travelling Players as Angelopoulos' masterpiece; 16 critics and five directors voted it one of their favorite films in the British Film Institute's 2012 Sight & Sound poll.

== Plot ==
A group of travelling players tour through Greece putting on a play called Golfo the Shepherdess. The first level of the film shows them setting up, rehearsing, promoting and performing in fustanella this 1893 piece, a bucolic verse drama of love, betrayal and death. In the next level the film focuses on the historical events between 1939 and 1952 as they are experienced by the travelling players and as they affect the communities which they visit: the last year of Metaxas' authoritarian dictatorship, the war against the Italians, the Nazi occupation, the liberation, the civil war between the government and communist insurgents, and British and American intervention in Greek affairs. In a further level the characters live their own drama of jealousy and betrayal, with its roots in the ancient myth of the House of Atreus. Agamemnon, a Greek refugee from Asia Minor, goes to war against the Italians in 1940, joins the resistance against the Germans, and is executed by them after being betrayed by Clytemnestra and Aegisthos. Aegisthos, Clytemnestra's lover, is an informer and collaborator working with the German occupiers. Orestes, son of Agamemnon and Clytemnestra, fights on the side of the leftists, avenges his father's death by killing his mother and Aegisthos. He is arrested in 1949 for his guerrilla activities and is executed in prison in 1951. Electra, his sister, helps the leftists and aids her brother in avenging the treachery of their mother and Aegisthos. After the death of Orestes she continues the work of the troupe and her relationship with Pylades. Chrysotheme, Electra's younger sister, collaborates with the Germans, prostitutes herself during the occupation, sides with the British during liberation, and later marries an American. Pylades, close friend of Orestes, is a Communist who is exiled by the Metaxas regime, joins the guerrillas and is arrested and exiled again. Finally he is forced to sign a written denunciation of the left after torture by the right wing and he is released from prison in 1950.

== Production ==
The Travelling Players was released to the general public after the Regime of the Colonels had ended in 1974 and Greece returned to a democratic rule. However Theo Angelopoulos had been working on the film throughout 1974 when the dictatorship was still in power, and had to hide his work from the authorities. To continue working he claimed he was producing a version of the Orestes myth set in the Axis occupation of Greece during World War II. Angelopoulos claimed that the colonels' junta gave him the idea for The Travelling Players; Angelopoulos, who was formerly a film critic for a socialist newspaper, wanted to analyze two things: the first being the history of Greece from a left-wing perspective, and second why it had been so difficult to establish democracy in Greece. The film was released in 1975.

== Style ==
Like many of Theo Angelopoulos' films, The Travelling Players uses long, static takes combined with complex tracking shots, and beautiful landscape photography to create a surrealistic atmosphere. Shots in the film often drift back and forth in time without warning and after a major scene there will be some down time for the viewer to contemplate what has just transpired.

== Responses ==
The Travelling Players was a great commercial success in Greece and also garnered international acclaim. It is regarded by many critics as the supreme achievement of the New Greek Cinema, and by some as one of the most important films of the latter half of the 20th century. It ranked #102 in the 2012 Sight & Sound critics' poll of the greatest motion pictures ever made, and has won numerous awards. On review aggregator Rotten Tomatoes, the film holds an 86% freshness rating, based on 14 reviews.

The Japanese filmmaker Akira Kurosawa cited The Travelling Players as one of his favorite films.

Although Angelopoulos had intended to enter The Travelling Players in the 1975 Cannes festival, the conservative Greek government prevented this. Despite the acclaim it has received, the film has yet to receive a proper Region 1 DVD release; there is, however, a region-free release.

== Awards ==
The film was selected as the Greek entry for the Best Foreign Language Film at the 48th Academy Awards, but was not accepted as a nominee.

- 1975. International Film Critics Award (FIPRESCI), Cannes.
- 1975. Best Film, Best Director, Best Screenplay, Best Actor, Best Actress, Greek Critics Association Awards, International Thessaloniki Film Festival
- Interfilm Award, «Forum» 1975 Berlin Festival.
- 1976. Best film of the Year, British Film Institute,
- Italian Film Critics Association: Best Film in the World, 1970-80.
- FIPRESCI: One of the Top Films in the History of Cinema.
- Grand Prix of the Arts, Japan.
- Best Film of the Year, Japan.
- Golden Age Award, Brussels.

== See also ==
- List of submissions to the 48th Academy Awards for Best Foreign Language Film
- List of Greek submissions for the Academy Award for Best Foreign Language Film
