= Theo Angelopoulos =

Greek film director, screenwriter and film producer (1935–2012)

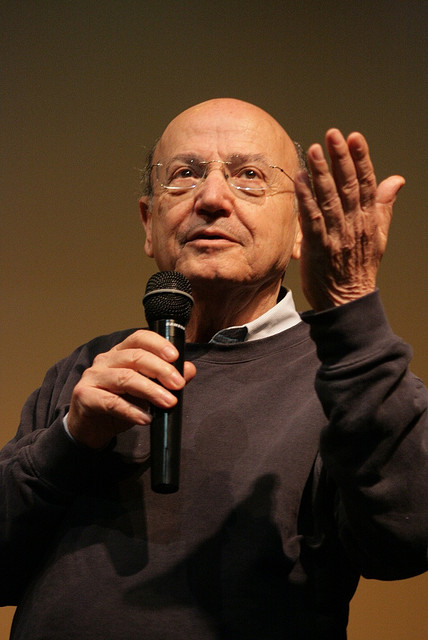
- Angelopoulos in 2009
- Born: Theodoros Angelopoulos; 27 April 1935; Athens, Greece
- Died: 24 January 2012 (aged 76); Piraeus, Greece
- Resting place: First Cemetery of Athens
- Education: University of Athens; IDHEC
- Occupations: Film director, screenwriter
- Years active: 1965–2012
- Spouse: Foivi Oikonomopoulou (m. 1980)
- Children: 3
- Awards: Palme d'Or (1998)
- Website: Official website

Theodoros "Theo" Angelopoulos (Greek: Θεόδωρος Αγγελόπουλος; 27 April 1935 – 24 January 2012) was a Greek filmmaker, screenwriter and film producer. He dominated the Greek art film industry from 1975 on, and Angelopoulos was one of the most influential and widely respected filmmakers in the world. He started making films in 1967. In the 1970s he made a series of political films about modern Greece.

Angelopoulos' films, described by Martin Scorsese as those of "a masterful filmmaker", are characterized by slight movement and distance changes, long takes, and complex, carefully composed scenes. His cinematic method is often described as "sweeping" and "hypnotic." Angelopoulos has said that in his shots, “time becomes space and space becomes time.” The pauses between action or music are important to creating the total effect.

In 1998 his film Eternity and a Day went on to win the Palme d'Or at the 51st edition of the Cannes Film Festival, and his films have been shown at many of the world's esteemed film festivals.

== Biography ==
Theodoros Angelopoulos was born in Athens on 27 April 1935. His father Spyros hailed from the town of Ampeliona, Messenia in the Peloponnese. During the Greek Civil War, his father was taken hostage and returned when Angelopoulos was 9 years old; according to the director, the absence of his father and looking for him among the dead bodies (during the "Dekemvriana" in Athens) had a great impact on his cinematography. He studied law at the University of Athens, but after his military service went to Paris to attend the Sorbonne. He soon dropped out to study film at the Institut des hautes études cinématographiques (IDHEC) before returning to Greece. There, he worked as a journalist and film critic. Angelopoulos began making films after the 1967 coup that began the Regime of the Colonels. He made his first short film in 1968 and in the 1970s he began making a series of political feature films about modern Greece: Days of '36 (Meres Tou 36, 1972), The Travelling Players (O Thiassos, 1975) and The Hunters (I Kynighoi, 1977). In 1978, he was a member of the jury at the 28th Berlin International Film Festival.

Theo Angelopoulos is a masterful filmmaker. He really understands how to control the frame. There are sequences in his work—the wedding scene in The Suspended Step of the Stork; the rape scene in Landscape in the Mist; or any given scene in The Traveling Players—where the slightest movement, the slightest change in distance, sends reverberations through the film and through the viewer. The total effect is hypnotic, sweeping, and profoundly emotional. His sense of control is almost otherworldly.

— Martin Scorsese

He quickly established a characteristic style, marked by slow, episodic and ambiguous narrative structures as well as long takes (The Travelling Players, for example, consists of only 80 shots in about four hours of film). These takes often include meticulously choreographed and complicated scenes involving many actors.

His regular collaborators include the cinematographer Giorgos Arvanitis, the screenwriter Tonino Guerra and the composer Eleni Karaindrou. One of the recurring themes of his work is immigration, the flight from homeland and the return, as well as the history of 20th century Greece. Angelopoulos was considered by British film critics Derek Malcolm and David Thomson as one of the world's greatest directors. Famous film directors including Werner Herzog Emir Kusturica, Akira Kurosawa, Ingmar Bergman, Wim Wenders, Dušan Makavejev, William Friedkin, Manoel de Oliveira, and Michelangelo Antonioni, among others, were admirers of his works.

While critics have speculated on how he developed his style, Angelopoulos made clear in one interview that "The only specific influences I acknowledge are Orson Welles for his use of plan-sequence and deep focus, and Mizoguchi, for his use of time and off-camera space." He had also cited Andrei Tarkovsky's 1979 work Stalker as an influence.

Angelopoulos was awarded honorary doctorates by the Université libre de Bruxelles, Belgium in 1995, by Paris West University Nanterre La Défense, France, by the University of Essex, UK in July 2001, by the University of Western Macedonia, Greece in December 2008, and by the University of the Aegean, Greece in December 2009.

== Death ==
Angelopoulos died late on Tuesday, 24 January 2012, several hours after being involved in a crash while shooting his latest film, The Other Sea in Athens. On that evening, the filmmaker had been with his crew in the area of Drapetsona, near Piraeus when he was hit by a motorcycle, which unconfirmed reports suggested was ridden by an off-duty police officer. The crash occurred when Angelopoulos, 76, attempted to cross a busy road. He was taken to a hospital, where he was treated in an intensive care unit but succumbed to his serious injuries several hours later. His funeral was a public expense, on 27 January at the First Cemetery of Athens.

== Filmography ==
Film and television work by Theo Angelopoulos
| Year | Original title | English title | Director | Writer | Notes |
|---|---|---|---|---|---|
| 1968 | Η εκπομπή (I Ekpombi) | Broadcast | Yes | Yes | Short film |
| 1970 | Αναπαράσταση (Anaparastasi) | Reconstruction | Yes | No | |
| 1972 | Μέρες του '36 (Meres tou '36) | Days of '36 | Yes | No | Part 1 of the "Trilogy of History" |
| 1975 | Ο Θίασος (O Thiassos) | The Travelling Players | Yes | Yes | Part 2 of the "Trilogy of History" |
| 1977 | Οι Κυνηγοί (I Kinighi) | The Hunters | Yes | Yes | Co-writer; Part 3 of the "Trilogy of History" |
| 1980 | Ο Μεγαλέξανδρος (O Megalexandros) | Alexander the Great | Yes | No | |
| 1983 | Αθήνα, επιστροφή στην Ακρόπολη (Athina, epistrofi stin Akropoli) | Athens, Return to the Acropolis | Yes | Yes | Segment of Capitali culturali d'Europa |
| 1984 | Ταξίδι στα Κύθηρα (Taxidi sta Kythira) | Voyage to Cythera | Yes | Yes | Co-writer; Part 1 of the "Trilogy of Silence" |
| 1986 | Ο Μελισσοκόμος (O Melissokomos) | The Beekeeper | Yes | Yes | Co-writer; Part 2 of the "Trilogy of Silence" |
| 1988 | Τοπίο στην ομίχλη (Topio stin Omichli) | Landscape in the Mist | Yes | Yes | Co-writer; Part 3 of the "Trilogy of Silence"; European Film Award for Best Film 1989 |
| 1991 | Το Mετέωρο Bήμα Tου Πελαργού (To Meteoro Vima tou Pelargou) | The Suspended Step of the Stork | Yes | No | Part 1 of the "Trilogy of Borders" |
| 1995 | Το βλέμμα του Οδυσσέα (To Vlemma tou Odyssea) | Ulysses' Gaze | Yes | Yes | Co-writer; Part 2 of the "Trilogy of Borders" |
| 1995 | Lumière et compagnie | Lumière and Company | Yes | Yes | Co-director/co-writer; Segment: Up to 52 seconds |
| 1998 | Μια αιωνιότητα και μια μέρα (Mia aioniotita kai mia mera) | Eternity and a Day | Yes | Yes | Co-writer; Part 3 of the "Trilogy of Borders"; Palme d'Or 1998 |
| 2004 | Τριλογία: Το λιβάδι που δακρύζει (Trilogia I: To Livadi pou dakryzi) | Trilogy: The Weeping Meadow | Yes | No | Part 1 of the trilogy on modern Greece |
| 2007 | Chacun son cinéma | To Each His Own Cinema | Yes | Yes | Co-director/co-writer; Segment: Trois minutes (Three Minutes) |
| 2008 | Η Σκόνη του Χρόνου (I skoni tou chronou) | The Dust of Time | Yes | No | Part 2 of the trilogy on modern Greece |
| 2011 | Mundo Invisivel | Invisible World | Yes | Yes | Co-director/co-writer; Segment: Sky below |
| — | I alli thalassa | The Other Sea | Yes | Yes | Part 3 of the trilogy on modern Greece |

== Awards ==
Angelopoulos won numerous awards, including the Palme d'Or at the 51st edition of the Cannes Film Festival in 1998 for Eternity and a Day (Mia aioniotita kai mia mera). His films have been shown at the most important film festivals around the world.

| Year | Issuer | Award | Film | Result |
|---|---|---|---|---|
| 1968 | Thessaloniki | Hellenic Association of Film Critics – Best Short Fiction | The Broadcast | Won (Note: At the Thessaloniki International Film Festival of 1968, The Broadcast was also the recipient of an Honorable Mention by the Hellenic Association of Film Critics Award.) |
| 1970 | Thessaloniki | Best Greek Art Film | Reconstitution | Won (Note: At the Thessaloniki International Film Festival of 1970, Reconstitution was also awarded: The Best Greek Cinematography: Giorgos Arvanitis; The Best Greek Supporting Actress: Toula Stathopoulou.) |
| 1970 | Thessaloniki | Best Greek New Director | Reconstitution | Won |
| 1970 | Thessaloniki | Hellenic Association of Film Critics – Best Film | Reconstitution | Won |
| 1971 | Berlinale | FIPRESCI – Special Mention | Reconstitution | Won |
| 1971 | Georges Sadoul | Best Film of the Year Shown in France | Reconstitution | Won |
| 1971 | Hyères | Best Foreign Film | Reconstitution | Won |
| 1972 | Thessaloniki | Best Greek Director | Days of '36 | Won (Note: At the Thessaloniki International Film Festival of 1972, Giorgos Arvanitis was awarded the Best Greek Cinematography prize for Days of '36.) |
| 1973 | Berlinale | FIPRESCI – Forum of New Cinema | Days of '36 | Won |
| 1975 | Cannes | FIPRESCI (Parallel Sections) | The Travelling Players (Note: The Travelling Players was also awarded: The Best Film in the World for 1970–1980 by Italian Film Critics Association.; One of the Top Films in the History of Cinema by FIPRESCI.; The Grand Prix of the Arts, Japan.; The Golden Age Award, Brussels.) | Won |
| 1975 | Berlinale | Interfilm Award – Forum of New Cinema | The Travelling Players | Won |
| 1975 | Thessaloniki | Best Greek Film | The Travelling Players | Won (Note: At the Thessaloniki International Film Festival of 1975, The Travelling Players was also awarded: The Best Greek Actor: Vangelis Kazan; The Best Greek Actress: Eva Kotamanidou; The Best Greek Cinematography: Giorgos Arvanitis; The Greek Critics Association Award) |
| 1975 | Thessaloniki | Best Greek Director | The Travelling Players | Won |
| 1975 | Thessaloniki | Best Greek Screenplay | The Travelling Players | Won |
| 1975 | BFI | Sutherland Trophy | The Travelling Players | Won |
| 1977 | Cannes | Palme d'Or | The Hunters | Nominated |
| 1978 | Chicago | Golden Hugo for Best Film | The Hunters | Won |
| 1980 | Kinema Junpo | Best Foreign Language Film Director | The Travelling Players | Won |
| 1980 | Japanese Academy | Best Foreign Language Film | The Travelling Players | Nominated |
| 1980 | Venice | FIPRESCI | Alexander the Great | Won |
| 1980 | Thessaloniki | Best Greek Film | Alexander the Great | Won |
| 1980 | Thessaloniki | Hellenic Association of Film Critics – Best Film | Alexander the Great | Won |
| 1984 | Cannes | Palme d'Or | Voyage to Cythera | Nominated (Note: At the 37th Cannes Film Festival, the Best Screenplay was awarded to Theodoros Angelopoulos, Tonino Guerra, and Thanassis Valtinos, and, the FIPRESCI International Film Critics Award was awarded ex-aequo with Paris, Texas by Wim Wenders.) |
| 1984 | Cannes | Best Screenplay | Voyage to Cythera | Won |
| 1984 | FIPRESCI | International Critic's Prize | Voyage to Cythera | Won |
| 1984 | Rio | Critics' Award | Voyage to Cythera | Won |
| 1986 | Venice | Golden Lion | The Beekeeper | Nominated |
| 1988 | Venice | Silver Lion | Landscape in the Mist | Won (Note: At the 46th Venice International Film Festival, Landscape in the Mist and Theodoros Angelopoulos were also awarded: The Prize of the Students of the University "La Sapienza"; The Pasinetti Award for the Best Film; The OCIC Award tied with The Legend of the Holy Drinker (La leggenda del santo bevitore) by Ermanno Olmi; The C.I.C.A.E. Award; The Sergio Trasatti Award; Theodoros Angelopoulos, and the film cast and crew were also nominated for: Best European Cinematographer: Giorgos Arvanitis; Best European Director: Theo Angelopoulos; Best European Screenwriter: Theo Angelopoulos, Tonino Guerra, and Thanassis Valtinos; Best European Supporting Performance) |
| 1989 | Berlinale | Interfilm Award – Forum of New Cinema | Landscape in the Mist | Won |
| 1989 | EFA | European Film Award for Best Film | Landscape in the Mist | Won |
| 1991 | Cannes | Palme d'Or | The Suspended Step of the Stork | Nominated |
| 1991 | Chicago | Golden Hugo for Best Director | Landscape in the Mist | Won (Note: At the 27th Chicago International Film Festival, Landscape in the Mist was also awarded the Silver Plaque for Best Cinematography) |
| 1995 | Cannes | Palme d'Or | Ulysses' Gaze | Nominated |
| 1995 | Cannes | Grand Jury Prize | Ulysses' Gaze | Won |
| 1995 | Cannes | International Critics' Prize | Ulysses' Gaze | Won |
| 1995 | EFA | FIPRESCI – FELIX of the Critics | Ulysses' Gaze | Won |
| 1996 | FSCC | Prix Léon Moussinac – Best Foreign Film | Ulysses' Gaze | Won |
| 1996 | INSFJ | Best Foreign Film Director | Ulysses' Gaze | Won |
| 1997 | Goya | Best European Film | Ulysses' Gaze | Nominated |
| 1997 | Mainichi | Best Foreign Language Film | Ulysses' Gaze | Won |
| 1997 | Sant Jordi | Best Foreign Film | Ulysses' Gaze | Won |
| 1997 | Turia | Best Foreign Film | Ulysses' Gaze | Won |
| 1998 | Cannes | Palme d'Or | Eternity and a Day | Won |
| 1998 | Cannes | Prize of the Ecumenical Jury | Eternity and a Day | Won |
| 1998 | São Paulo | Audience Award – Best Feature | Ulysses' Gaze | 3 |
| 1998 | Thessaloniki | Best Greek Film | Eternity and a Day | Won |
| 1998 | Thessaloniki | Best Greek Director | Eternity and a Day | Won |
| 1998 | Thessaloniki | Best Greek Screenplay | Eternity and a Day | Won |
| 1999 | ACCA | Silver Condor for Best Foreign Film | Ulysses' Gaze | Won |
| 2001 | ACCA | Silver Condor for Best Foreign Film | Eternity and a Day | Won |
| 2004 | Berlinale | Golden Bear | Trilogy: The Weeping Meadow | Nominated |
| 2004 | EFA | European Film Award for Best Film | Trilogy: The Weeping Meadow | Nominated (Note: At the 17th European Film Awards (2004), Theodoros Angelopoulos was also nominated for Best Director.) |
| 2004 | EFA | Audience Award | Trilogy: The Weeping Meadow | Nominated |
| 2004 | EFA | FIPRESCI – European Film Academy Critics | Trilogy: The Weeping Meadow | Won |
| 2005 | Fajr | Special Jury Prize – Spiritual Competition | Trilogy: The Weeping Meadow | Won |

=== Lifetime achievement awards ===
Theodoros Angelopoulos was also the recipient of many awards for his long standing career.

| Year | Provider | Award |
|---|---|---|
| 1995 | Université libre de Bruxelles | Honorary Doctorate |
| 1996 | Italian National Syndicate of Film Journalists | European Silver Ribbon |
| 2001 | University of Essex | Honorary Graduate |
| 2003 | Copenhagen International Film Festival | Honorary Award (Note: Theodoros Angelopoulos was the head of the jury of the first edition of the Copenhagen International Film Festival, held between 13–20 August 2003.) |
| 2003 | Flaiano Film Festival | Honorary Award |
| 2004 | Montreal World Film Festival | Grand Prix Special des Amériques |
| 2004 | Busan International Film Festival | Hand Printing |
| 2008 | University of Western Macedonia | Honorary Graduate |
| 2010 | Golden Apricot Yerevan International Film Festival | Lifetime Achievement Award |
| 2009 | University of the Aegean | Honorary Graduate |
| 2010 | Dokuz Eylül University | Honorary Doctorate |
| — | Paris West University Nanterre La Défense | Honorary Doctorate |

== Sources ==
Books

- Fainaru, Dan (2001). Theo Angelopoulos: Interviews (Conversations with Filmmakers Series). University Press of Mississippi. ISBN 978-1578062164.
- Horton, Andrew (1999) [1997]. The Films of Theo Angelopoulos: A Cinema of Contemplation. Princeton, New Jersey: Princeton University Press. ISBN 0-691-01005-6. OCLC 154632603.
- Kolovos, Nikos (1990). Θόδωρος Αγγελόπουλος [Theodoros Angelopoulos] (in Greek). Athens: Aegokeros. OCLC 28342373.
- Kolovos, Nikos (1999). Κινηματογράφος Η τέχνη της βιομηχανίας [Cinema: The Art of Industry] (in Greek). Athens: Kastaniotis. ISBN 960-03-2704-1. OCLC 54107678.
- Merry, Bruce (2004). Encyclopedia of Modern Greek Literature. Westport, Connecticut: Greenwood. p. 145. ISBN 0-313-30813-6. OCLC 53938047. Archived from the original on 22 February 2012.
- Syska, Rafał (2008). Poezja Obrazu: Filmy Theo Angelopoulosa [Poetry of Pictures: Theo Angelopoulos Films] (in Polish). Kraków: Rabid. ISBN 978-83-60236-34-5. OCLC 297540425.
- Thomson, David (2002). The New Biographical Dictionary of Film. New York: Alfred A. Knopf. pp. 21–22. ISBN 0-375-41128-3. OCLC 49247183.

Journals, magazines, and web

- Constantinidis, Stratos E. (May 2000). "Greek Film and the National Interest: A Brief Preface". Journal of Modern Greek Studies. 18 (1). Baltimore: Johns Hopkins University; Project MUSE: 1–12. ISSN 0738-1727. OCLC 360217850.
- Malcolm, Derek (15 June 2000). "Theo Angelopoulos: The Travelling Players". Guardian Unlimited. London.
