= Petros Markaris =

Greek writer (b. 1937)

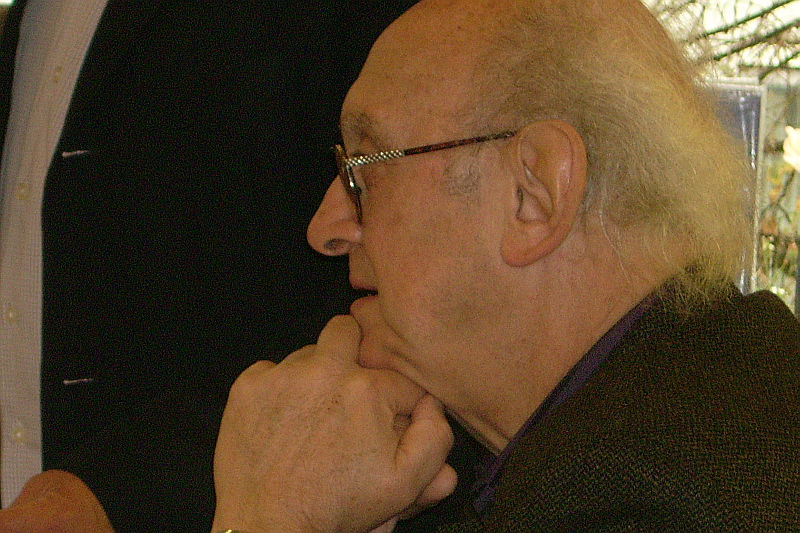
- Petros Markaris in 2007
- Born: Istanbul, Turkey
- Occupation: Author
- Writing career
- Genre: Mystery fiction
- Notable work: Costas Haritos series

Pétros Márkaris (Greek: Πέτρος Μάρκαρης; born Bedros Markarian) is a Greek crime fiction writer. He is known for his detective novels starring the grumpy Athenian police investigator Costas Haritos.

== Early life and education ==
The son of an Armenian entrepreneur and a Greek mother, Pétros Márkaris was born as Bedros Markarian in Istanbul.

He attended the St. George's Austrian High School in Istanbul and studied economics after his Abitur for some years in Vienna and in Stuttgart. The family moved to Athens in 1954, but Markaris did not settle permanently there until 1964. That year over 15,000 Greeks (Greek passport holders) were expelled from Istanbul and their properties were confiscated, a major blow for the city's millenarian Greek community. Because of his father, he belonged to the Armenian minority for many years and did not have any citizenship; he became a Greek citizen shortly after 1974, together with the rest of the Armenian minority in Greece. Markaris speaks and writes in Greek, Turkish and German. Today he lives in Athens.

== Literary works ==
Markaris wrote several plays and cooperated with Theo Angelopoulos on a number of film scripts. He translated several German dramas into Greek such as Goethe's Faust I and Faust II, as well as Brecht's Mother Courage.

=== The Costas Haritos series ===
The Costas Haritos series has as their main hero and first person narrator a detective in the Athenian criminal police in his fifties. He has a squabbling, fairly uneducated, and TV-addicted, but dearly loved wife, an aspiring, but stubborn, law student daughter, and an unpleasant, brown-nosing boss. It is hinted several times that Haritos assisted with the torture of leftist prisoners as a very young man under the Colonels' regime, a fact he is quite ashamed of now, and which makes him insecure whenever he has to deal with political leftists of all shades (obviously a fairly common species in Greece even today). Being somewhat old-fashioned (and not always too consistent) in his personal views, he deplores the loss of Greek traditions (but still has French croissants for breakfast rather than sesame rings), dislikes the masses of foreigners entering Greece (which does not stop him from befriending and highly respecting individual foreigners) and despises corruption (but gives large "tips" to his physician). His subjective self-deprecating comments contrast well with the objective high work-ethic and even heroism he displays. The modern Athens of rampant air pollution, ugly concrete buildings, constant traffic jams, and hordes of annoying tourists, is the backdrop of the first four novels (the fifth is set in Istanbul).

The first three books of the series have seen U.K. editions in English as well, under the titles (all straightforward translations from the Greek titles): "Late-Night News" ("Deadline in Athens" in the U.S.), "Zone Defence" and "Che Committed Suicide": the next, "Main Shareholder", as of 2012 has not been published yet in English. The fifth novel in the series, not yet scheduled for publication in English, is named "Earlier, Much Earlier", and is placed in Istanbul, in the milieu of the local, indigenous Greek community (the Rum). A sixth novel, entitled "Expiring Loans" (Ληξιπρὀθεσμα Δἀνεια), was published in Greek in late 2010, and has been translated into several languages. This was the first book in the "Crisis Trilogy" (Τριλογἰα της Κρἰσεως), of which the second, "Termination" (Περαἰωση), first came out in 2011; the third, "Bread, Education, Liberty" (Ψωμί, Παιδεία, Ελευθερία) was published in 2012. In 2023, this book was translated into Persian by Qasem Sanavi. An epilogue to the series (another full mystery) came out in 2014: "End Titles" (Τίτλοι Τέλους).

=== Other work ===
In addition to the Inspector Haritos novels, Markaris has written a non-fiction work entitled "Η Αθήνα της Μιας Διαδρομής" (literally "The Athens of a Single Route"). It is a description and recent history of Athens in the environs of the Electric Train (Piraeus to Kifissia — forerunner of the Metro). In the prologue, Markaris says that the book was originally published in German, and he had no intention of publishing it in Greek, feeling that what would interest foreigners would not be of interest to Greeks. However, his publisher convinced him to reconsider, and the book was published in 2013.

== Awards ==
In August 2013, Markaris was awarded the Goethe Medal for his "distinguished contribution to the German language and international cultural relations".

== Selected bibliography ==
- Νυχτερινό Δελτίο ("Night Bulletin") (1995)
- Άμυνα Ζώνης ("Zone Defence") (1998)
- Ο Τσε αυτοκτόνησε ("Che Committed Suicide") (2003)
- Αθήνα, Πρωτεύουσα των Βαλκανίων ("Athens, Capital of the Balkans", short story collection) (2005)
- Βασικός Μέτοχος ("Main Shareholder") (2006)
- Παλιά, πολύ παλιά ("Long, long ago") (2008)
- Ελληνικά Εγκλήματα 3 ("Greek Crimes 3", short story collection) (2009)
- Ληξιπρόθεσμα Δάνεια ("Overdue Loans", Judgment Trilogy 1) (2010)
- Περαίωση ("Thinning", Judgment Trilogy 2) (2011)
- Ψωμί, Παιδεία, Ελευθερία, ("Bread, Education, and Liberty", Judgment Trilogy 3) (2012)
- Τίτλοι Τέλους ("End Titles", Judgment Trilogy, Epilogue) (2014)
- Τριημερία ("Three days", short story collection) (2015)
- Offshore (2016)
- Σεμινάρια Φονικής Γραφής ("Writing Seminars") (2018)
- Η εποχή της υποκρισίας ("The Age of Hypocrisy") (2019)
- Ο φόνος είναι χρήμα ("Murder is Money") (2020)
- Η τέχνη του τρόμου ("The Art of Horror") (2021)
