= 1950 in literature =

This article contains information about the literary events and publications of 1950.

== Events ==
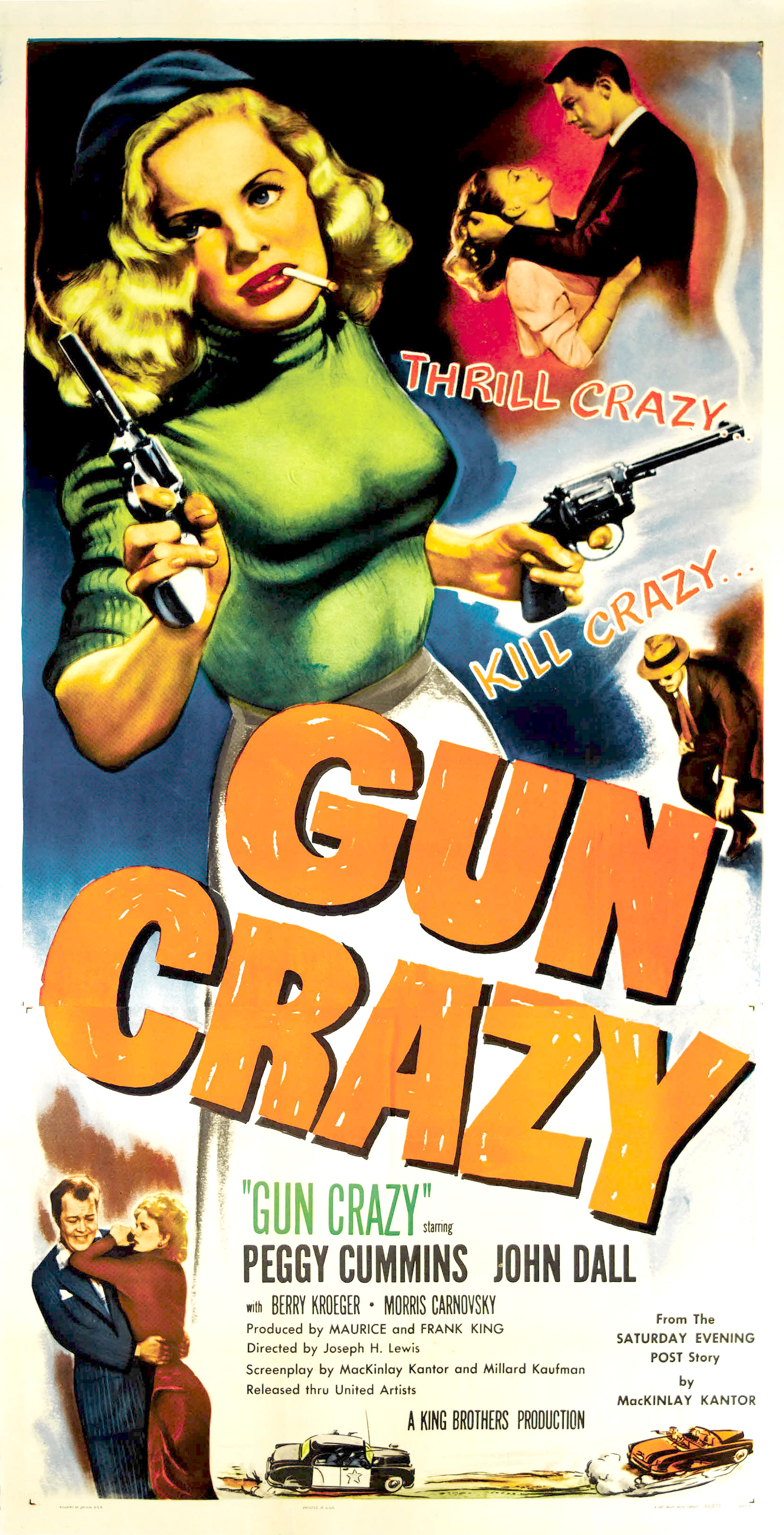
Alternate theatrical release poster of Gun Crazy

- January 19 – Isaac Asimov's first full-length novel, Pebble in the Sky, is published in the United States by Doubleday.
- January 26 – For the film noir Gun Crazy, released on this day in the United States, co-writer Dalton Trumbo is billed as Millard Kaufman, due to the former's inclusion on the Hollywood blacklist. This year Trumbo serves 11 months in prison for Contempt of Congress, in the federal penitentiary in Ashland, Kentucky.
- February – Jack Kerouac has his first novel, The Town and the City, published in the United States.
- April 8 – J. D. Salinger's wartime short story "For Esmé — with Love and Squalor" is published in The New Yorker.
- May 11 – Eugène Ionesco's first play, The Bald Soprano is first performed, in Paris.
- September 10 – George Bernard Shaw is taken to hospital after fracturing a hip falling out of a tree he was pruning. He is released from hospital a few weeks later after a successful operation, but suffers kidney failure and dies at his home, Shaw's Corner (Ayot St Lawrence, Hertfordshire, England), aged 94.
- October – Galaxy Science Fiction magazine launches in the United States.
- October 2 – The daily comic strip Peanuts, by Charles M. Schulz, makes its debut in nine United States newspapers.
- October 16 – C. S. Lewis's children's portal allegorical fantasy novel The Lion, the Witch and the Wardrobe, illustrated by Pauline Baynes, is published by Geoffrey Bles in London, first of the seven-book The Chronicles of Narnia.
- December 20 – Poet T. S. Eliot expresses concerns about "the television habit" in a letter to The Times (London).
- unknown dates
  - Aleksandr Solzhenitsyn is sent to a "special camp" for political prisoners in Kazakhstan.
  - The 13th–14th century Japanese epic poem The Tale of the Heike (平家物語) is retold in modern prose by the historical novelist Eiji Yoshikawa as Shin Heike monogatari (New Tale of the Heike) and published in Asahi Weekly.
  - Blackwell's opens the first specialist children's bookshop, in Broad Street, Oxford (England).
  - Adrian Bell begins his Countryman's Notebook column in the Eastern Daily Press (England).

== New books ==
=== Fiction ===
- Reginald Arkell – Old Herbaceous (reissued 2002)
- Isaac Asimov
  - I, Robot (collected short stories)
  - Pebble in the Sky
- Georges Bataille – L'Abbé C
- Nicolas Bentley – The Floating Dutchman
- Georges Bernanos – Night Is Darkest
- Ray Bradbury – The Martian Chronicles
- Gwen Bristow – Jubilee Trail
- Pearl S. Buck – The Child Who Never Grew
- John Bude – Death Steals the Show
- Victor Canning
  - A Forest of Eyes
  - Venetian Bird
- John Dickson Carr
  - The Bride of Newgate
  - Night at the Mocking Widow (as Carter Dickson)
- Alec Coppel – Mr. Denning Drives North
- Peter Cheyney
  - Dark Bahama
  - Lady, Behave!
- Agatha Christie
  - A Murder Is Announced
  - Three Blind Mice and Other Stories
- Beverly Cleary – Henry Huggins
- Catherine Cookson – Kate Hannigan
- William Cooper – Scenes from Provincial Life
- Edmund Crispin – Frequent Hearses
- A. J. Cronin – The Spanish Gardener
- L. Sprague de Camp and P. Schuyler Miller – Genus Homo
- L. Sprague de Camp and Fletcher Pratt – The Castle of Iron
- Daphne du Maurier – The Parasites
- Marguerite Duras – Un Barrage contre le Pacifique (The Sea Wall)
- Friedrich Dürrenmatt – The Judge and His Hangman (Der Richter und sein Henker)
- Hans Fallada (died 1947) – The Drinker (Der Trinker; written 1944)
- Jeffrey Farnol – The Ninth Earl
- Ford Madox Ford (died 1939) – Parade's End (tetralogy first published together under this title)
- James Fugaté (as James Barr) – Quatrefoil: A Modern Novel
- Hugh Garner – Cabbagetown
- Gaito Gazdanov – The Buddha's Return (Возвращение Будды, Vozvrashchenie Buddy, serialization completed)
- Anthony Gilbert
  - Murder Comes Home
  - A Nice Cup of Tea
- Frank Gilbreth, Jr. and Ernestine Gilbreth Carey – Belles on Their Toes
- Winston Graham – Night Without Stars
- Vasily Grossman – Stalingrad
- Giovannino Guareschi – The Little World of Don Camillo
- Frank Hardy – Power Without Glory
- Ernest Hemingway – Across the River and Into the Trees
- John Hersey – The Wall
- Georgette Heyer - The Grand Sophy
- Robert Hichens – Beneath the Magic
- Patricia Highsmith – Strangers on a Train
- Anne Hocking – Death Disturbs Mr. Jefferson
- Elizabeth Jane Howard – The Beautiful Visit
- Robert E. Howard – Conan the Conqueror
- Richard Hull – Invitation to an Inquest
- Hammond Innes – The Angry Mountain
- MacKinlay Kantor – Lee and Grant at Appomattox
- Margaret Kennedy – The Feast
- Jack Kerouac – The Town and the City
- Frances Parkinson Keyes – Joy Street
- Damon Knight – To Serve Man (short stories)
- Manuel Mujica Láinez – Misteriosa Buenos Aires (short stories)
- Doris Lessing – The Grass Is Singing
- Audrey Erskine Lindop – The Tall Headlines
- E. C. R. Lorac – Accident by Design
- Rose Macaulay – The World My Wilderness
- Ross Macdonald – The Drowning Pool
- Gladys Mitchell – Groaning Spinney
- Roger Nimier – The Blue Hussar
- Juan Carlos Onetti – La vida breve (A Brief Life)
- Cesare Pavese – La luna e i falò
- Mervyn Peake – Gormenghast
- Pramoedya Ananta Toer – Perburuan (The Fugitive)
- Kukrit Pramoj – Four Reigns (สี่แผ่นดิน, Si Phaen Din, serialized)
- Barbara Pym – Some Tame Gazelle (originally written c.1934)
- Ellery Queen – Double, Double
- Conrad Richter – The Town
- Henry Morton Robinson – The Cardinal
- Cezaro Rossetti – Kredu min, sinjorino!
- Budd Schulberg – The Disenchanted
- Samuel Shellabarger – The King's Cavalier
- Nevil Shute – A Town Like Alice
- Josef Škvorecký – Konec nylonového věku (The End of the Nylon Age)
- John Steinbeck – Burning Bright
- Rex Stout
  - Three Doors to Death
  - In the Best Families
- Cecil Street
  - Family Affairs
  - The Two Graphs
  - A Village Afraid
- Julian Symons – The Thirty-First of February
- Edith Templeton – Summer In The Country
- Josephine Tey – To Love and Be Wise
- Tereska Torrès – Women's Barracks
- Boris Vian – L'Herbe rouge
- Gore Vidal – Dark Green, Bright Red
- A. E. van Vogt – The Voyage of the Space Beagle
- Mika Waltari – The Adventurer
- Evelyn Waugh – Helena
- Denton Welch – A Voice Through a Cloud
- Antonia White – The Lost Traveller
- Kathleen Winsor – Star Money
- Yasushi Inoue
  - 黯い潮 (Kuroi ushio)
  - その人の名は云えない (Sono hito no na ha ienai)
  - 闘牛 (Tōgyū, The Bullfight)
- Frank Yerby – Floodtide

=== Children and young people ===
- Mabel Esther Allan
  - Over the Sea to School
  - A School in Danger
- Rev. W. Awdry – Troublesome Engines (fifth in The Railway Series of 42 books by him and his son Christopher Awdry)
- Leila Berg – The Adventures of Chunky (first in the Chunky series)
- Joan Mary Wayne Brown as Mary Gervaise
  - A Pony of Your Own
  - Ponies and Holidays (first two in the Georgie series of ten books)
- Anthony Buckeridge – Jennings Goes to School
- Beverly Cleary – Henry Huggins
- C. S. Forester – Mr. Midshipman Hornblower
- William Glynne-Jones – Pennants on the Main
- C. S. Lewis – The Lion, the Witch and the Wardrobe (first in The Chronicles of Narnia series)
- Elinor Lyon – The House in Hiding (first novel in Ian and Sovra series)
- Katherine Milhous – The Egg Tree
- Anne Parrish – The Story of Appleby Capple
- Richard Scarry – First Book Ever
- Dr. Seuss
  - If I Ran the Zoo
  - Gerald McBoing Boing
  - Yertle the Turtle and Other Stories
- James Thurber – The 13 Clocks

=== Drama ===
- Arthur Adamov
  - La Parodie
  - L'Invasion
  - La Grande et la Petite Manoeuvre
- Bertolt Brecht – The Tutor (Der Hofmeister, adapted from Lenz)
- Wynyard Browne – The Holly and the Ivy
- Emilio Carballido – Rosalba y los Llaveros
- Campbell Christie – His Excellency
- John Dighton – Who Goes There!
- Friedrich Dürrenmatt – Romulus the Great (Romulus der Große)
- Christopher Fry – Venus Observed
- Kermit Hunter – Unto These Hills
- William Inge – Come Back, Little Sheba
- Eugène Ionesco – The Bald Soprano (La Cantatrice chauve)
- Benn Levy – Return to Tyassi
- Frederick Lonsdale – The Way Things Go
- Roger MacDougall
  - The Gentle Gunman
  - To Dorothy, a Son
  - Macadam and Eve
- Esther McCracken – Cry Liberty
- Colin Morris – Reluctant Heroes
- Clifford Odets - The Country Girl
- Terence Rattigan – Who Is Sylvia?
- Nelly Sachs – Eli: Ein Mysterienspiel vom Leiden Israels (verse)
- C. P. Snow – View Over the Park
- John Steinbeck – Burning Bright
- Vernon Sylvaine – Will Any Gentleman?

=== Poetry ===
- Leah Bodine Drake – A Hornbook for Witches
- Pablo Neruda – Canto General
- Stevie Smith – Not Waving but Drowning

=== Non-fiction ===
- Roland Bainton – Here I Stand: A Life of Martin Luther
- Elizabeth David – A Book of Mediterranean Food
- Victor Gollancz (ed.) – A Year of Grace
- Ernst Gombrich – The Story of Art
- Thor Heyerdahl – The Kon-Tiki Expedition
- Octavio Paz – The Labyrinth of Solitude
- Lionel Trilling – The Liberal Imagination: Essays on Literature and Society
- Raymond Williams – Reading and Criticism
- Cecil Woodham-Smith – Florence Nightingale
- Desmond Young – Rommel: The Desert Fox

== Births ==
- January 5 – Valentina Tăzlăuanu, Moldovan essayist, journalist and theatre critic (died 2020)
- January 17 – Luis López Nieves, Puerto Rican writer
- January 19 – Will Weaver, American author
- January 20 – Edward Hirsch, American poet
- January 22 – Paul Bew, Irish historian and academic
- January 24 – Benjamin Urrutia, Ecuadorian author and scholar
- January 25 – Gloria Naylor, African-American novelist and academic (died 2016)
- February 11 – Mauri Kunnas, Finnish children's author
- February 20 – Jean-Paul Dubois, French novelist and journalist
- February 26:
  - Irena Brežná, Slovak-Swiss writer, journalist and activist writing in German
  - Adam Cornford, English poet and essayist
- March 17 – Peter Robinson, British-born Canadian novelist (died 2022)
- March 19 – Kirsten Boie, German children's writer
- March 23 – Ahdaf Soueif, Egyptian novelist
- April 20 – Steve Erickson, American novelist
- May 1 – Aldino Muianga, Mozambican physician and writer
- May 27 – Alex Gray, Scottish crime writer
- June 21 – Anne Carson, Canadian poet and scholar
- June 25 – Barbara Gowdy, Canadian novelist
- July 3 – Zhang Kangkang (张抗抗), Chinese writer
- August 9 – Nicole Tourneur, French novelist (died 2011)
- August 26 – Carl Deuker, American author
- September 7 – Peggy Noonan, American columnist, political writer
- September 16 – Henry Louis Gates, American literary critic
- September 20 – James Blaylock, American fantasy author
- September 28 – Christina Hoff Sommers, American author and philosopher
- October 10 – Nora Roberts, American novelist
- October 12 – Edward Bloor, American novelist
- October 15 – Teresa Amy, Uruguayan poet and translator (died 2017)
- October 17 – David Adams Richards, Canadian author
- October 18 – Wendy Wasserstein, American playwright (died 2006)
- October 27 – Fran Lebowitz, American writer
- November 3 – Massimo Mongai, Italian author
- November 4 – Charles Frazier, American novelist
- December 18 – Leonard Maltin, American film critic and historian
- December 20 – Sheenagh Pugh, English-born poet and novelist
- December 30 – Timothy Mo, Hong Kong British novelist
- unknown dates
  - Bandi, North Korean fiction writer
  - Greg McGee, New Zealand playwright and crime fiction writer
  - Candace Robb, American historical novelist

== Deaths ==
- January 5 – Basil Williams, English historian (born 1867)
- January 8 – Joseph Schumpeter, Austrian/American political economist (born 1883)
- January 21 – George Orwell (Eric Arthur Blair), English novelist (tuberculosis, born 1903)
- February 7 – D. K. Broster, English historical novelist (born 1877)
- February 13 – Rafael Sabatini, Italian-born English-language novelist (born 1875)
- February 24 – Irving Bacheller, American journalist and novelist (born 1859)
- March 5 – Edgar Lee Masters, American poet (born 1868)
- March 11 – Heinrich Mann, German novelist (born 1871)
- March 19 – Edgar Rice Burroughs, American author (born 1875)
- March 22 – Emmanuel Mounier, French philosopher, journalist and theologian (born 1905)
- circa March 30 – Henric Streitman, Romanian essayist and journalist (born 1870)
- April 1 – F. O. Matthiessen, American historian and literary critic (born 1902)
- April 4 – Cuthbert Whitaker, English yearbook editor (born 1873)
- April 8 – Albert Ehrenstein, Austrian Expressionist poet (born 1886)
- April 27 – H. Bonciu, Romanian novelist, poet and translator (cancer, born 1893)
- May 6 – Agnes Smedley, American journalist and writer (born 1892)
- May 8 – Cezaro Rossetti, Scottish-born Esperanto writer (born 1901)
- May 10 – Belle da Costa Greene, American librarian (born 1883)
- May 11 – Alfred O. Andersson, English-born American journalist and newspaper publisher (born 1874)
- June 4 – George Cecil Ives, German-born English poet, writer and reformer (born 1867)
- June 14 – Katharine Glasier, English writer and socialist (born 1867)
- July 7 – Guy Gilpatric, American short story writer (suicide, born 1896)
- August 27 – Cesare Pavese, Italian poet and novelist (born 1908)
- September 6 – Olaf Stapledon, English philosopher and science fiction writer (heart attack, born 1886)
- September 18 – Henrik Rytter, Norwegian dramatist, lyricist and translator (born 1887)
- October 9 – Nicolai Hartmann, German-Latvian philosopher (born 1882)
- October 19 – Edna St. Vincent Millay, American poet (heart attack, born 1892)
- October 31 – Herbert Kelly, English religious writer and cleric (born 1860)
- November 2 – George Bernard Shaw, Irish dramatist, critic and activist (born 1856)
- November 25 – Johannes V. Jensen, Danish author (born 1873)
- December 25 – Xavier Villaurrutia, Mexican poet and dramatist (born 1903)
- December 28 – Sigizmund Krzhizhanovsky, Soviet short-story writer (born 1887)
- unknown dates
  - Edith Escombe, English fiction writer and essayist (born 1866)
  - Helen Rowland, American journalist and humorist (born 1875)

== Awards ==
- Carnegie Medal for children's literature: Elfrida Vipont, The Lark on the Wing
- Friedenspreis des Deutschen Buchhandels: Max Tau
- James Tait Black Memorial Prize for Fiction: Robert Henriques, Through the Valley
- James Tait Black Memorial Prize for Biography: Cecil Woodham-Smith, Florence Nightingale
- Mystery Writer Of Japan – Kazuo Shimada, Shakai-bu Kisha ("City Reporter")
- National Book Award for Fiction: Nelson Algren, The Man with the Golden Arm
- National Book Award for Nonfiction: Ralph L. Rusk, The Life of Ralph Waldo Emerson
- National Book Award for Poetry: William Carlos Williams, Paterson: Book Three and Selected Poems
- Newbery Medal: Marguerite de Angeli, The Door in the Wall
- Newdigate Prize: John Bayley
- Nobel Prize in Literature: Bertrand Russell
- Premio Nadal: Elena Quiroga, Viento del norte
- Pulitzer Prize for Drama: Richard Rodgers, Oscar Hammerstein II, Joshua Logan, South Pacific
- Pulitzer Prize for Fiction: A. B. Guthrie Jr., The Way West
- Pulitzer Prize for Poetry: Gwendolyn Brooks, Annie Allen (first African American winner)
