= 1950 in poetry =

Nationality words link to articles with information on the nation's poetry or literature (for instance, Irish or France).

== Events ==
- Charles Olson publishes his seminal essay, "Projective Verse". In this, he calls for a poetry of "open field" composition to replace traditional closed poetic forms with an improvised form that should reflect exactly the content of the poem. This form is to be based on the line, and each line is to be a unit of breath and of utterance. The content is to consist of "one perception immediately and directly (leading) to a further perception". This essay becomes a kind of de facto manifesto for the Black Mountain poets.
- George Oppen and his wife, Mary, move from the United States to Mexico, where their links to Communism are less problematic.
- The Beloit Poetry Journal is founded by Robert Glauber and Chad Walsh. It is intended to be a publication of Beloit College since Walsh is an English teacher there.
- Pioneer Press founded in Jamaica.
- Saint Lucia Arts Guild founded by Derek and Roderick Walcott.

== Works published in English ==
Listed by nation where the work was first published and again by the poet's native land, if different; substantially revised works listed separately:

=== Canada ===
- Dorothy Livesay, Call My People Home, Canada
- James Wreford Watson, Of Time and the Lover (Toronto: McClelland & Stewart).

=== India, in English ===
- Sri Aurobindo, Savitri ( Poetry in English ), Pondicherry: Sri Aurobindo Ashram
- R. Bhagavan, Poems ( Poetry in English ), the author's first book of poems, Calcutta: Writers Workshop; India .
- Doreen W. Wickremasinghe, editor, Poems of East & West, Colombo: Colombo Apothecaries Co., 170 pages; anthology; Ceylon (now Sri Lanka),

=== New Zealand ===
- Ursula Bethell, Collected Poems, Christchurch: Caxton Press (posthumous)
- Alistair Campbell, Mine Eyes Dazzle, Christchurch: Pegasus Press, including "The Return" and "Elegy"
- M. K. Joseph, Imaginary Islands
- Kendrick Smithyman, The Blind Mountain, Caxton
- Hubert Witheford, The Shadow of the Flame

=== United Kingdom ===
- W. H. Auden, Collected Shorter Poems 1930-1944, published March 9; English poet living in the United States at this time
- George Barker, The True Confession of George Barker
- Basil Bunting, Poems: 1950
- Norman Cameron, Forgive Me, Sire, and Other Poems
- Walter de la Mare, Inward Companion, published in October
- Robert Duncan, The Mongrel, and Other Poems
- David Gascoyne, A Vagrant, and Other Poems
- Robert Gittings, Wentworth Place.
- John Heath-Stubbs and David Wright, editors, The Forsaken Garden: An Anthology of Poetry 1824-1909
- John Heath-Stubbs, The Swarming of the Bees
- Margery Lawrence, Fourteen to Forty-Eight: a diary in verse
- Ewart Milne, Diamond Cut Diamond, Irish poet published in the UK
- Mervyn Peake, The Glassblowers
- James Reeves, The Wandering Moon
- Jon Silkin, The Portrait, and Other Poems
- Stevie Smith, Harold's Leap

=== United States ===
- W. H. Auden, Collected Shorter Poems 1930-1944 (English poet living at this time in the United States)
- E. E. Cummings, XAIPE: 71 Poems
- Leah Bodine Drake, A Hornbook for Witches
- Robert Duncan, Medieval Scenes
- Richard Eberhart, An Herb Basket
- Robert Lowell, Poems 1938–1949
- Mid-Century American Poets, an anthology including poets who came to prominence in the 1940s, including Robert Lowell, Muriel Rukeyser, Karl Shapiro, Elizabeth Bishop, Theodore Roethke, Randall Jarrell, and John Ciardi
- Theodore Morrison, The Dream of Alcestis
- Howard Nemerov, Guide to the Ruins
- John Frederick Nims, A Fountain in Kentucky
- Ezra Pound, Seventy Cantos
- Carl Sandburg, Complete Poems
- Delmore Schwartz, Vaudeville for a Princess
- William Jay Smith, Celebration at Dark
- Wallace Stevens, The Auroras of Autumn, includes "The Auroras of Autumn," "Large Red Man Reading," "In a Bad Time," "The Ultimate Poem Is Abstract," "Bouquet of Roses in Sunlight," "An Ordinary Evening in New Haven," and "A Primitive Like an Orb"), Knopf
- Peter Viereck, Strike Through the Mask! New Lyrical Poems
- Richard Wilbur, Ceremony and Other Poems, New York: Reynal and Hitchcock
- William Carlos Williams, The Collected Later Poems

=== Other in English ===
- Nancy Cato, The Darkened Window, Australia

== Works published in other languages ==
Listed by nation where the work was first published and again by the poet's native land, if different; substantially revised works listed separately:

=== France ===
- Aimé Césaire, Corps perdu, Martinique author published in France; Paris: Fragrance
- René Char, Les Matinaux
- Jean Follain, Chef-Lieu
- Jean Grosjean, Hypotases
- Henri Michaux, Passages
- Raymond Queneau, Petite cosmogonie portative
- Roger-Arnould Rivière, Nuit et Jour
- Tristan Tzara, pen name of Sami Rosenstock, Parler seul

=== Germany ===
- Berthold Brecht writes the Children's Hymn, a poem protesting what he felt was Nazi corruption of the Deutschlandlied.

=== Hebrew ===
- Haim Gouri, Ad A lot Ha-Shahar ("Till Dawn"), poetry and war diary, Israeli writing in Hebrew
- Hillel Omer (who wrote under the name "Ayin Hillel"), Eretz Ha-Tzohorayim ("The Noon Country"), Publisher: Sifriat Poalim; Israel

=== India ===
Listed in alphabetical order by first name:

- Bhagvati Charan Varma, Tara, Hindi verse play
- Bhatt Damodar Kesavaji, pen name Sudhansu Ramasagar, Indian, Gujarati
- G. Sankara Kurup, Odakkuzhal (The Bamboo Flute), Malayalam
- Buddhidhari Singha, Aves, Maithili
- Khalilur Rahman, A'inah Khane men, Urdu
- Madhunapantula Satyanarayanashastri, Andhra Racayitalu, Telugu-language poet (surname: Satyanarayanashastri)
- Rentala Gopalakrishna, Sangharsana Telugu
- Subhas Mukhopadhyay, Cirkut, Bengali
- Sreedhara Menon, Srirekha, Malayalam

=== Other languages ===
- Nezihe Araz, Benim Dünyam ("My World"), Turkey
- García Baena, Antiguo Muchacho ("Boy of Yore"); Spain
- Dulce María Loynaz, Versos, Cuban poet published in Spain
- Alexander Mezhirov, Коммунисты, вперёд! ("Communists, Ahead!"), includes the title poem, which was first published in 1948; reprinted 1952
- Pablo Neruda, Canto General, Chilean poet
- Nizar Qabbani, You Are Mine, Syrian poet writing in Arabic

== Awards and honors ==
- Consultant in Poetry to the Library of Congress (later the post would be called "Poet Laureate Consultant in Poetry to the Library of Congress"): Conrad Aiken appointed this year.
- Harriet Monroe Prize from Poetry magazine: E.E. Cummings
- National Book Award for Poetry: William Carlos Williams, Paterson: Book III and Selected Poems
- Pulitzer Prize for Poetry: Gwendolyn Brooks, Annie Allen (first African American winner)
- Bollingen Prize: Wallace Stevens
- Fellowship of the Academy of American Poets: E. E. Cummings
- Canada: Governor General's Award, poetry or drama: Of Time and the Lover, Charles Wreford Watson

== Births ==
Death years link to the corresponding "[year] in poetry" article:

- January 1 – James Richardson, American poet and academic
- January 20 – Edward Hirsch, American poet and academic
- February 6 – Deborah Digges (died 2009), American poet and academic
- March 5 – Jack Bedson, Australian writer, poet, children's picture book author and university librarian
- April 4 – Charles Bernstein, American poet, critic, editor and teacher
- April 28:
  - Carolyn Forché, American poet, editor and human rights advocate
  - Brian Brett, Canadian poet and novelist
- May 9:
  - Christopher Dewdney, avant-garde Canadian poet
  - Jorie Graham American poet and the editor of numerous volumes of poetry
  - Tato Laviera, Puerto Rician-American poet and author (died 2013)
- May 22 – Bernie Taupin, English lyricist
- June 5 – John Yau, American poet and critic
- June 21 – Anne Carson, Canadian poet, essayist, translator and academic
- July 1 – Ekram Ali, Indian Bengali poet and critic
- August 7 – T. R. Hummer, American
- August 8 – Philip Salom, Australian poet and novelist
- August 12 – Medbh McGuckian, Northern Ireland poet
- August 20 – Chase Twichell, American poet and owner of her own publishing company, Ausable Press
- September 1 – John Forbes (died 1998), Australian
- September 17 – Narendra Modi, Indian politician and poet
- September 30 – Shaunt Basmajian (died 1990), Canadian
- October 8 – Blake Morrison, English poet, critic and writer
- October 24 – Syed Kawsar Jamal Indian Bengali poet and essayist
- November 20 – E. Ethelbert Miller, African American
- December 20 – Sheenagh Pugh, British
- December 24 – Dana Gioia, American poet who retires early from his career as a corporate executive at General Foods to write full-time and later chairman of the National Endowment for the Arts
- Also:
  - Anthony J. Bennett, Australian
  - Charles Buckmaster (died 1972), Australian
  - Frances Chung (died 1990), American
  - Rodney Jones, American poet and academic
  - William Logan, American poet, critic and academic
  - Muntazir Baba (died 2018), Indian-born Pakistani Pashto poet
  - Sandy Shreve, Canadian
  - Nicolette Stasko, American-born Australian poet, teacher and editor; has a daughter with David Brooks
  - Arthur Sze, American
  - Grace Nichols, Guyanese in England
  - Komninos Zervos (also known as "kominos"), Australian performance poet

== Deaths ==
Birth years link to the corresponding "[year] in poetry" article:

- March 5 – Edgar Lee Masters (born 1868), American poet, biographer and dramatist
- May 4 – William Rose Benét (born 1886), American poet, writer, editor, and the older brother of Stephen Vincent Benét
- May 20 – John Gould Fletcher (born 1886), Pulitzer Prize-winning American, Imagist poet and author
- August 27 – Cesare Pavese (born 1908) Italian poet, novelist, literary critic and translator
- October 19 – Edna St. Vincent Millay, 58 (born 1892), of a heart attack;
- September 17 – Hoshino Tenchi 星野天知 (born 1862), Meiji period poet and martial arts master; a co-founder of Bungakukai literary magazine; 8th Grand Master and a teacher of the Yagyu Shinkage-ryu martial-arts school (surname: Hoshino)
- November 14 – Orhan Veli Kanik (born 1914), Turkish poet.
- December 5 – Sri Aurobindo (Bengali: শ্রী অরবিন্দ Sri Ôrobindo) (born 1872), Indian nationalist, poet, Yogi and spiritual Guru writing mostly in English
- December 25
  - Ridgely Torrence (born 1874), American
  - Xavier Villaurrutia (born 1903), Mexican poet and dramatist
- December 26 – James Stephens (born 1880), Irish poet and novelist
- Also:
  - Khavirakpan (born 1895), Indian, Meitei language poet

== See also ==
- Poetry
- List of poetry awards
- List of years in poetry
