= Canto General (1975 album) =

Live album by Mikis Theodorakis
- Recorded: August 13 & August 16, 1975

Canto General, an oratorio for two voices, mixed choir and orchestra by Mikis Theodorakis based on poems from Canto General by Pablo Neruda was recorded live on August 13, 1975, at the Karaiskakis-Stadium, Pireus and on August 16, 1975, at the Panathinaikos-Stadium, Athens.

The recording was performed by the artists who took part in the 1974 Paris première of the seven movements that constituted the oratorio at that time. By 1981, Theodorakis had completed the oratorio to its now valid form in 13 movements. There are two recordings available of the complete opus (1981 conducted by Theodorakis, and 1989 conducted by Loukas Karytinos).

== Track listing ==
=== A side ===
1. Algunas Bestias - 13:40
2. Voy A Vivir (1949) - 5:50

=== C side ===
1. La United Fruit Co. - 7:20
2. Vienen Los Pajaros - 10:15

=== B side ===
1. Los Libertadores - 16:50

=== D side ===
1. Vegetaciones - 7:05
2. America Insurrecta (1800) - 10:35

== Personnel ==
- Manos Katrakis (narrator [introduction])
- Maria Farantouri (vocal)
- Petros Pandis (vocal)
- Alberto Newman (piano)
- Dora Bakopoulou (piano)
- Evangelos Assimakopoulos (guitar)
- Liza Zoe (guitar)
- Chr. Konstantinos (bouzouki)
- L. Karnezis (bouzouki)
- The National Choir of France, directed by Jacques Grimbert
- The Folk Orchestra, directed by Yiannis Didilis
- Les Percussions de Strasbourg
