= Frances Chung =

Frances Chung may refer to:

- Frances Chung (poet), American poet
- Frances Chung (dancer), Canadian dancer
