= La vida breve =

La vida breve, The brief life, or A brief life may refer to:

- La vida breve (opera)
- La vida breve (novel)

== See also ==
- The Brief Wondrous Life of Oscar Wao
- La vida precoz y breve de Sabina Rivas
