= Dust of Time =

Dust of Time may refer to:

- "Dust of Time", a song by English rock group Hawkwind, part of Levitation (album)
- The Dust of Time, a 2008 Greek drama film by Theodoros Angelopoulos
