= Elegy of the Uprooting =

Live album by Eleni Karaindrou
- Released: 2006
- Recorded: March 27, 2005
- Venue: Megaron; Athens, Greece
- Genre: Film music
- Length: 93:06
- Label: ECM New Series; ECM New Series 1952/53
- Producer: Manfred Eicher

Eleni Karaindrou chronology
The Weeping Meadow (2004)	Elegy of the Uprooting (2006)	Dust of Time (2009)

Elegy of the Uprooting is a live double album by Greek composer Eleni Karaindrou recorded with Camerata Orchestra and the ERT Choir conducted by Alexandros Myrat at the Megaron in Athens on March 27, 2005 and released on the ECM New Series the following year.

== Reception ==
The AllMusic review by Thom Jurek awarded the album 5 stars stating "Karaindrou is a giant. In her quiet way she towers over more popular figures, simply by digging through the historical, cultural, and musical past, through the images brought forth by them, and by the poetics of the human heart. There is no hollow sentimentality in this work. In fact, it is stripped of that artifice to reach the purity of emotion, presented by a composer and musicians who understand restraint, allowing the story presented here to reveal itself, not by narrative so much as by context and the honesty of the music itself. Without doubt, this is the modern classical recording of 2006 and will go down as a classic in the field."

Professional ratings
Review scores
Source	Rating
Allmusic	5/5 stars

== Track listing ==
All compositions by Eleni Karaindrou

Disc One:

1. "Prayer" – 3:59
2. "Refugee's Theme" – 1:42
3. "The Weeping Meadow" – 3:28
4. "Dance" – 3:30
5. "An Ode of Tears" – 4:07
6. "For the Phrygian Land a Vast Mourning" – 2:08
7. "By the Sea" – 1:25
8. "Depart and Eternity Theme" – 6:21
9. "Rosa's Aria" – 3:52
10. "Memories" – 2:43
11. "Hecuba's Lament / Hecuba's Theme II" – 1:39
12. "Telamon, You Came to Conquerour Town" – 1:41
13. "The City That Gave Birth to You Was Consumed by Fire" – 2:02
14. "An Ode of Tears" – 0:36
15. "Theme of the Uprooting I" – 0:42
16. "The Weeping Meadow II" – 2:08
17. "Voyage" – 1:57
18. "Voyage to Cythera" – 2:17
19. "On the Road" – 3:10

Disc Two:

1. "Parade" – 2:56
2. "Return" – 2:25
3. "Andromache's Theme" – 0:53
4. "The Land I Call Home" – 1:46
5. "Home of My Forefathers" – 1:46
6. "I Wish I'm Given There" – 1:21
7. "Refugee's Theme" – 2:01
8. "The Seagull" – 1:26
9. "The Song of the Lake" – 2:26
10. "Adagio – Father's Theme" – 2:56
11. "In Vain the Sacrifices" – 2:13
12. "My Beloved, Your Soul is Wandering" – 2:58
13. "The Decision" – 2:40
14. "The Farewell Theme" – 4:25
15. "Theme of the Lake" – 2:32
16. "Hecuba's Theme II" – 1:03
17. "Lament for Astyanax" – 2:11
18. "Exodos" – 2:48
19. "The Weeping Meadow" – 2:53

== Personnel ==
- Eleni Karaindrou – piano
- Maria Farantouri – voice
- Antonis Kontogeorgiou – choirmaster
  - Hellenic Radio and Television Choir
- Alexandros Myrat – conductor
  - Camerata Orchestra
    - Soloists:
      - Vangelis Christopoulos – oboe
      - Socratis Sinopoulos Constantinople – lyra, laouto
      - Maria Bildea – harp
      - Konstantinos Raptis – accordion, bayan
      - Sergiu Nastasa – violin
      - Renato Ripo – cello
      - Stella Gadedi – flute
      - Nikos Guinos – clarinet
      - Sopcratis Anthis – trumpet
      - Spyros Kazianis – bassoon
      - Vangelis Skouras – French horn
      - Aris Dimitriadis – mandolin
      - Christos Tsiamoulis – ney
      - Panos Dimitrakopoulos – kanonaki
      - Andreas Katsiyiannis – santouri
      - Andreas Papas – bendir, daouli
