= Muianga =

Muianga is a surname of Mozambique origin. Notable people with the surname include:

- Aldino Muianga (born 1950), Mozambican physician and writer
- Hélder Muianga, Mozambican footballer
- Natalia Muianga (born 1998), Polish singer and songwriter
- Sete Muianga, Mozambican basketball player
