= A Hornbook for Witches =

Poetry collection by Leah Bodine Drake

- Jacket illustration by Frank Utpatel for A Hornbook for Witches
- Author: Leah Bodine Drake
- Cover artist: Frank Utpatel
- Language: English
- Genre: poetry
- Publisher: Arkham House
- Publication date: 1950
- Publication place: United States
- Media type: Print (Hardback)
- Pages: 70 pp

A Hornbook for Witches: Poems of Fantasy is a collection of poems by Leah Bodine Drake. It was released in 1950, and was the author's first book and her only collection published by Arkham House. It was released in an edition of 553 copies, of which 300 were given to the author, making this one of the rarest books published by Arkham House. The jacket was the work of Frank Utpatel. The volume is dedicated to Drake's ancestor Jean Bodin "who also concerned himself with witches."

According to Sheldon Jaffery's The Arkham House Companion, "the story goes that Ms Drake approached Derleth and requested that a book of her poetry be published by Arkham House, one that would contain a great many more poems than were contained in the 1947 anthology Dark of the Moon. Derleth refused except on the condition that she bear the cost, to which she agreed. After publication of A Hornbook for Witches, Drake received back about 300 copies as her share of the enterprise. Thus, the rarity of the book is explained, as only 253 were available for distribution by Arkham House directly to its dealers and subscribers. It's uncertain what became of Drake's 300 copies, although many may have been given or sold to her friends and neighbors. Lin Carter once told me that he was, some years ago, in a small midwestern city and saw Drake toting a shopping bag overflowing with copies of Hornbook, which she was autographing and selling for $1.50 per copy. The story has the ring of truth since Leah Bodine Drake, at the time the book was published, worked for the Evansville, Indiana Courier. Carter, lacking the foresight that we all acquire through hindsight, failed to buy any copies. He later spent $450.00 for one in less than perfect condition, as it was the last book needed to complete his Arkham House collection."

The New York Times reviewer Orville Prescott described Drake as "a poet who writes in conventional rhyme schemes about very unconventional subjects" and noted that "for the most part Miss Drake goes her own original and fanciful way. Her poems may not be contributions to the great art of poetry, but they are rather fun in a grisly fashion." Boucher and McComas wrote that the collection would appeal "to devotees of supernatural verse (or of attractive book-making)."

An audiobook by the same name was released in 1976, read by Vincent Price. It contains four poems by Drake ("A Hornbook for Witches", "Witches on the Heath", "'All Saints Eve", and "The Ballad of the Jabberwock") as well as other material. The audio was originally released as both LP and on cassette (by Caedmon TC-1497) but can now be sourced on the internet as a CD recording.

== Contents ==
A Hornbook for Witches contains the following poems:

1. "A Hornbook for Witches"
2. "Unhappy Ending"
3. "Witches on the Heath"
4. "The Tenants"
5. "The Ballad of the Jabberwock"
6. "Bad Company"
7. "Mouse Heaven"
8. "Rabbit-Dance"
9. "Wood-wife"
10. "A Likely Story"
11. "The Man Who Married a Swan Maiden"
12. "All-Saints Eve"
13. "The Last Faun"
14. "Changeling"
15. "In the Shadows"
16. "Figures in a Nightmare"
17. "The Witch Walks in Her Garden"
18. "The Seal-Woman's Daughter"
19. "They Run Again"
20. "The Path Through the Marsh"
21. "Old Wives' Tale"
22. "A Vase from Araby"
23. "The Fur Coat"
24. "House Accurst"
25. "The Vision"
26. "Sea-Shell"
27. "Willow Women"
28. "The Girl in the Glass"
29. "Heard on the Roof at Midnight"
30. "Terror by Night"
31. "Legend"
32. "The Heads on Easter Island"
33. "Haunted Hour"
34. "Goat Song"
35. "The Nixie's Pool"
36. "Stranger"
37. "Encounter in Broceliande"
38. "The Window on the Stair"
39. "The Old World of Green"
40. "Curious Story"
41. "The Steps in the Field"
42. "Midsummer Night"
43. "Old Daphne"
44. "Mad Woman's Song"
45. "Griffin's Gold"
46. "Black Peacock"
47. "The Centaurs"
