= The Dust of Time =

- Greek promotional poster
- Directed by: Theodoros Angelopoulos
- Written by: Theodoros Angelopoulos
- Produced by: Phoebe Economopoulous
- Starring: Willem Dafoe; Irène Jacob; Bruno Ganz; Michel Piccoli; Christiane Paul
- Cinematography: Andreas Sinanos
- Edited by: Yannis Tistsopoulos; Giorgos Chelidonides
- Music by: Eleni Karaindrou
- Release dates: 22 November 2008 (Thessaloniki); 12 February 2009 (Greece)
- Running time: 125 minutes
- Country: Greece
- Language: English
- Budget: $13 million

The Dust of Time (Greek: Η Σκόνη του Χρόνου) is a 2008 Greek drama film written and directed by Theodoros Angelopoulos, and starring Willem Dafoe, Irène Jacob, Bruno Ganz, Michel Piccoli and Christiane Paul.

The film is the second of an unfinished trilogy started with Trilogy: The Weeping Meadow in 2004. The final installment, under the working title The Other Sea, was left incomplete due to Angelopoulos' unexpected death in January 2012.

== Plot ==
In 1999, A, an American filmmaker of Greek descent, receives a phone call from his melancholic daughter at the Cinecittà studio. He rushes back to his apartment in Rome, where he finds a letter his mother, Eleni, wrote to his father, Spyros, in 1956.

In 1953, Eleni and Jacob, a Jew of German descent, watch a newsreel in the Soviet industrial city Temirtau (now in Kazakhstan). Spyros arrives, and he and Eleni jump onto a tram, ditching Jacob. The tram arrives at the public square in front of the government office, where Stalin's death is publicly announced. That night, following an intimate encounter, Spyros and Eleni are arrested and separated.

In 1956 in Siberia, Eleni puts her three-year-old son on a train to Moscow, where Jacob's older sister will take care of him.

On New Year's Eve 1973, Eleni and Jacob cross the border from Communist Hungary to Austria. After celebrating the New Year together, Eleni ends the relationship, encouraging Jacob to go on to Israel.

In the summer of 1974, Eleni finally finds Spyros in New York’s suburbs. However, she leaves without greeting him after realizing that he is already married to another woman.

In winter 1974, Eleni crosses the border from the United States to Canada. There, she and A meet again for the first time in many years. A drives Spyros to an Ontario bar, where Eleni works. Spyros proposes to Eleni, which she accepts.

In 1999, Eleni and Spyros arrive in a reunified Berlin. Jacob visits and the three go out to the station. There, Eleni feels dizzy. Spyros phones A and is informed that their granddaughter has been found. Eleni and Spyros go to the old building where their granddaughter barricades herself among addicts and vagabonds. Eleni enters and rescues her granddaughter. They return to A's Berlin apartment, and Eleni lies down in her granddaughter's room. After visiting, Jacob drowns himself in the Spree river.

On New Year's Day 2000, Eleni dies. Spyros and his granddaughter look out of the window. After a while, the two run hand in hand under a snowy Brandenburg Gate.

== Cast ==
- Willem Dafoe as A
- Irène Jacob as Eleni, A's mother
- Michel Piccoli as Spyros
- Bruno Ganz as Jacob
- Christiane Paul as Helga
- Tiziana Pfiffner as Eleni, A's daughter
- Alessia Franchini as A's secretary
- Reni Pittaki as the film composer

== Production ==
The Dust of Time was shot over a four-month period, starting in 2007. Filming took place in Russia, Kazakhstan, Canada, the United States, Germany, Italy, and Greece.

== Release ==
The Dust of Time premiered at the 2008 Thessaloniki International Film Festival. It was shown at the 59th Berlin International Film Festival.

The score by Eleni Karaindrou was released on the ECM label in 2009.

== Reception ==
The Dust of Time received some positive reviews in the Greek press. Peter Brunette of The Hollywood Reporter gave the film a mixed review, stating that the plot had improbable situations and describing the film as "a curious mixture of the brilliant and the absurd." Dan Fainaru of Screen International felt that it is Theodoros Angelopoulos' most affecting and personal film in years. Derek Elley of Variety criticized the film as "a tired-looking attempt to say something significant by a 73-year-old auteur who has neither anything significant left to say nor the cinematic smarts to say it with." Vrasidas Karalis found the film to suffer from overplotting, and viewed its "depictions of intersecting temporalities" as inventive but confusing. In the book Cinema of Theo Angelopoulos, Angelos Koutsourakis wrote that "the expository dialogue [...] often comes across as wooden" and stated that the film had a "bristling recalcitrance".

Ronald Bergan was more positive, writing in The Guardian that "the film sometimes veers from the profound to the portentous, from the sublimely ridiculous to the ridiculously sublime. However, these weaknesses fade beside the strength of the great set pieces [...] and the passion of the narrative."

In a press conference for the Greek media, the director was asked about the critics for his film and replied that "the directors are not chosen by the critics or by the audience but by the time" and that for him all of his films are chapters of the same films, "Chapters, as he said, of a big book, about human destiny, about the times passed and about the times coming".
