= Maria Farantouri =

Greek singer

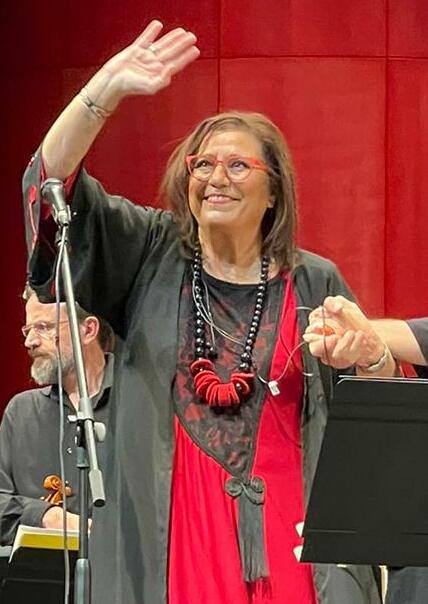
- Farantouri in 2022

Background information
- Born: 28 November 1947 (age 78); Athens, Greece
- Genres: Entekhno
- Occupations: Singer, politician
- Website: www.farantouri.gr

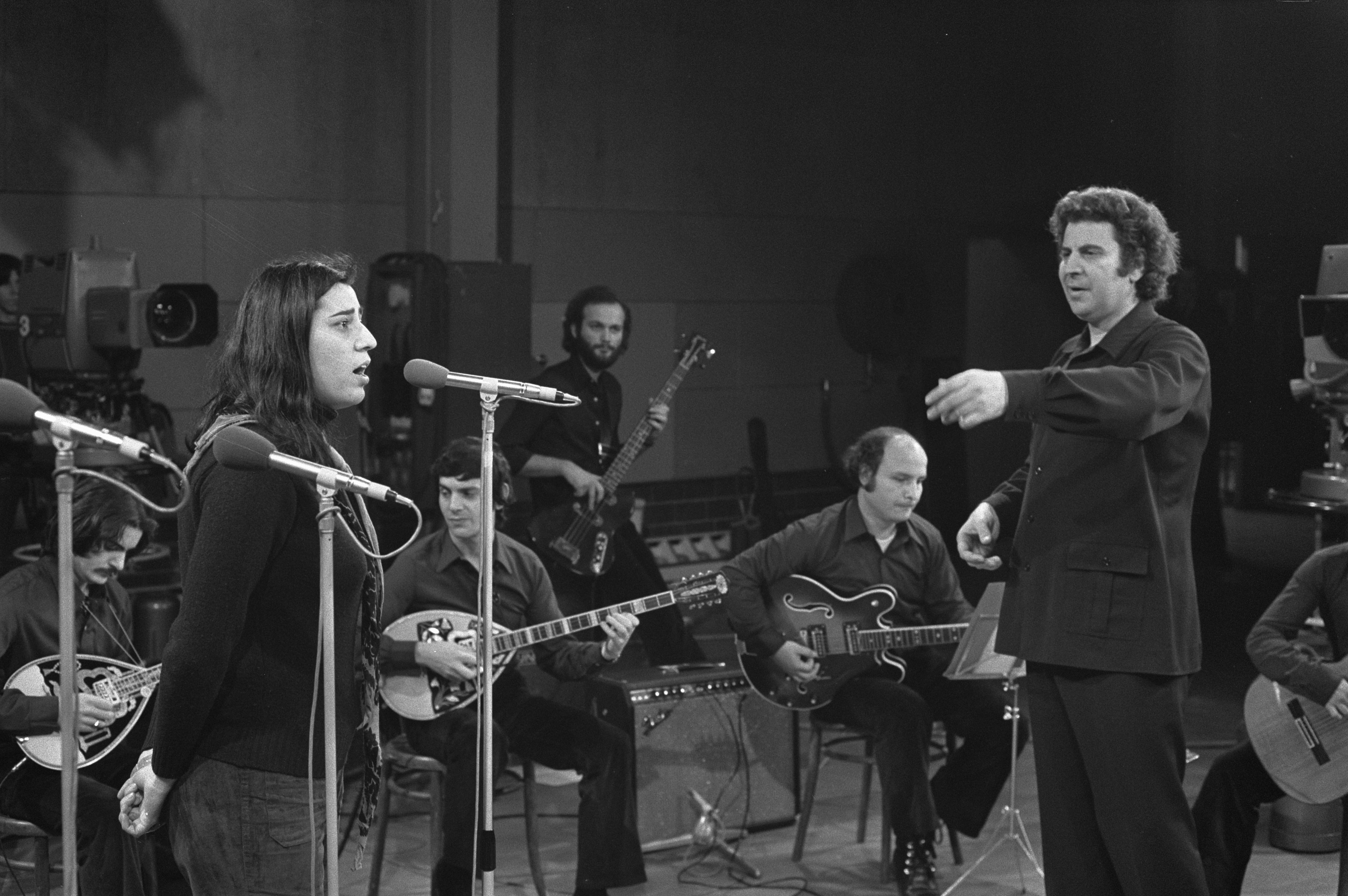
Farantouri and Mikis Theodorakis (1972)

Maria Farantouri or Farandouri (Greek: Μαρία Φαραντούρη; born 28 November 1947) is a Greek singer and also a political and cultural activist. She has collaborated with Greek composers such as Mikis Theodorakis, who wrote the score for Pablo Neruda's Canto General, which Farantouri performed worldwide.

During the Greek military junta of 1967–1974, Maria Farantouri recorded protest songs in Europe with Mikis Theodorakis. In 1971, she recorded Songs and Guitar Pieces by Theodorakis with Australian guitarist John Williams which included seven poems by Federico García Lorca. She has recorded songs in Spanish ('Hasta Siempre Comandante Che Guevara'), Italian, and English ("Joe Hill" and Elisabeth Hauptmann's Alabama Song from Bertolt Brecht's Rise and Fall of the City of Mahagonny), George Gershwin's works, as well as works by Greek composers Manos Hatzidakis, Eleni Karaindrou and Vangelis.

Her voice is contralto with two octaves.

Maria Farantouri was an elected member of the Greek Parliament from 1989 to 1993 representing the Panhellenic Socialist Movement (PASOK). She is married to the poet and former politician Tilemachos Chytiris.

On 23 September 2004, the President of the Hellenic Republic recognized the contribution of Maria Farantouri to Greek song, awarding her the Gold Cross of the Order of the Phoenix. She was awarded the 2014 Premio Tenco for her contribution to international contemporary and traditional music, and the Spanish LiberPress 2017.

== Discography ==
- John Williams Maria Farandouri: Mikis Theodorakis – Songs Of Freedom (1974)
- Maria Farantouri: Mosaic (Libra, 2004)
- Maria Farantouri: Live im Olympia (Plane, 1987)
- Maria Farantouri: 17 Songs (EMI, 1990)
- Maria Farantouri: Tou Feggariou Ta Pathi (Afieroma Sto Federico García Lorca) (Live concert 1996)
- Maria Farantouri: Way Home (Peregrina, 2007)
- Mikis Theodorakis: Sinfonietta, Farantouri, Frankfurt Chamber Orchestra (Intuition, 1999)
- Theodorakis: The Ballad of Mauthausen-Farantouri Cycle (1966)
- Theodorakis: Poetica (Peregrina, 1998)
- Theodorakis: Asmata (Peregrina, 1998)
- Theodorakis: Canto General (various versions)
- Theodorakis: Pnevmatiko Emvatirio (Live at Royal Albert Hall, London 1971)
- Manos Hadjidakis: The era of Mellisanthi (Lyra, 1981)
- Eleni Karaindrou: Elegy of the Uprooting (ECM, 2005)
- Charles Lloyd & Maria Farantouri: Athens Concert 2CDs (ECM, 2010)
- Maria Farantouri: Maria Farantouri Sings Taner Akyol – Maria Farantouri sings in Greek translation poems of the persecution suffered by the Kurdish people.
- Mauthausen Trilogy (Plane, 2000)
- Maria Farantouri: I Triti Porta (The Third Door). Music by Lena Platonos (Minos, 2000)
- Maria Farantouri Sings George Gershwin (Legend, 2007)
- Maria Farantouri: Afieroma Ston Miki Theodoraki (Melody Maker, 2008)
- Maria Farantouri, Hthes Archisa na Tragoudo (I began Singing Yesterday) Live at Herodes Atticus Odeon, 2 CDs, DVD (Minos, 2014)
- Maria Farantouri – Cihan Turkoglu, Beyond the Borders (ECM 2019)
