= Harvey Flink =

American poet (1902–1951)

Harvey Wagner Flink (15 September 1902 – April 1951) was a poet from Pennsylvania known for his poems of the Pennsylvania countryside and his weird poetry. Although his work appeared in a number of periodicals and anthologies, his only solo book of verse is 1943's A Mellow Horn, a result of having been awarded a prize from the now defunct Muse magazine. His work in periodicals included the Centre Daily Times and most notably Weird Tales and brought him national notice. He also appeared in Dark of the Moon: Poems of Fantasy and the Macabre, edited by the author August Derleth. Born in Illinois, he spent most of his life in Centre Hall, Pennsylvania. He never married or had children.
