= Christos Tsiamoulis =

Greek musician

Christos Tsiamoulis (Χρήστος Τσιαμούλης, born Athens 1961) is a Greek musicologist and musician. He is best known for his writings on Greek and East Mediterranean folk music traditions, and as a singer and musician in recordings of recovered Greek folk songs and traditions.

== Discography ==
- Christos Tsiamoulis meets Kh'Alil Karadouman* - Where Nostalgia Hurts (CD) Lyra ML 0708 2001

=== With Ensemble Dynámeis tou Aigaíou ===
- "Dynámeis tou Aigaíou"1985 (LYRA) Mílo mou kókkino
- "Íchos V' "1987 (EMI) Misó fengári próvale
- "Anatolikó Paráthyro" 1989 (MBI) Kókkina cheíli fílisa
- "Óles oi Méres pou Éleipa" 2002 (Filocalia Romana)

=== Own recordings ===
- "Áthos o Emós" 1992 (LYRA)
- "Erotókastro" 1994 (FM RECORDS)
- "Ávra Thalassiní" 1995 [Me tin Kaíti Kouliá] (FM RECORDS)
- "Mousikés tis Ionikís Gis" 1996 (Kéntro Mikrasiatikón Spoudón)
- "Metamórfosis" 1997 with Pedro Estevan Glossa Records
- "Monácha gia na Taxidévo" 1997 with Alk. Ioannídi, K. Papadopoúlou and S. Papázoglou (LYRA)
- "Tragoúdia kai Skopoí tou Póntou" 1998 with M. Kaliontzídi (Anexártiti Paragogí)
- "O Chr. Tsiamoúlis synantá ton Chalíl Karantoumán" 2001 live (LYRA)
- "Anéspera" 2003 with G. Amarantídi (LIBRA)
- "Sas ta 'pan álloi?" 2003 Kálanta Dodekaimérou (Melodikó Karávi)
- "Afýlachti Skopiá" 2004 with Lizéta Kaliméri and Manóli Lidáki (LIBRA)
- "Carte - postale" 2005 instrumental (Melodikó Karávi)
- "Dodekáorto" 2006 with E. Vitáli, M. Mitsiá, Alk. Ioanídi, G. Charoúli (Institoúto "'Agios Máximos o Graikós")

=== Participations ===
- "Apópse stou Thomá" with K. Féri
- "Katharós Ouranós kai Ánemos eínai" with G. Stavrianó (FM RECORDS)
- "Pergaminí" with El. Perinoú (AN'KI)
- "To mantíli tis Neráidas" with F. Papadódima (LYRA)
- "O anthós tou tragoudioú" with L. Kaliméri (LYRA)
- "Smýrni" Estoudiantína N. Ionías Vólou (MINOS)
- "Dákry sto Gyalí" Estoudiantína N. Ionías Vólou (MINOS)
- "Álfa len to próto grámma" songs from the Peleponnes (Melodikó Karávi) 2004
- "Ródo tou Anémou" G. Zínkiris (Melodikó Karávi) 2003
- "To Kleidí" M. Lidákis (AKTI) 2004
- "Kókkino Akrogiáli" M. Lidákis (AKTI) 2004
- "Tampachaniótika" Lámpis Xyloúris (SEISTRON) 2005
- "Melodíes tis Anatolís" (Archeío Ellinikís Mousikís)
- "Choroí tis Ellinikís Anatolís" (Archeío Ellinikís Mousikís) 2005
