= Dust of Time (soundtrack) =

Soundtrack album by Eleni Karaindrou
- Released: 2009
- Recorded: January and March 2008
- Studio: Megaron; Athens, Greece
- Genre: Film music
- Length: 44:40
- Label: ECM New Series; ECM 2070
- Producer: Manfred Eicher

Eleni Karaindrou chronology
Elegy of the Uprooting (2005)	Dust of Time (2009)

Dust of Time: Music for the film by Theodoros Angelopoulos is a soundtrack album by Greek composer Eleni Karaindrou recorded in 2008 and released on the ECM New Series the following year. The music was featured in the film The Dust of Time by Theodoros Angelopoulos.

== Reception ==
The AllMusic review by Thom Jurek awarded the album 4 stars stating "While her many scores for his films have been celebrated for their subtlety and ingenious sense of time and nuance – as well as instrumentation, texture, and color – this one moves across musical cultures as well as across the span of years built into the script. As a piece of music, it walks the line between modern classical music with folk themes and more historical post-Romantic-era composition."

Professional ratings
Review scores
Source	Rating
AllMusic	4/5 stars

== Track listing ==
All compositions by Eleni Karaindrou

1. "Le Temps Perdu" – 2:07
2. "Dance Theme Var II" – 2:40
3. "Notes I" – 1:19
4. "Seeking Var II" – 2:23
5. "Waltz by the River" – 3:33
6. "Unravelling Time I" – 1:21
7. "Tsiganiko I" – 1:22
8. "Dance Theme Var I" – 3:17
9. "Seeking" – 2:37
10. "Memories from Siberia" – 3:16
11. "Unravelling Time II" – 1:21
12. "Notes II" – 2:33
13. "Tsiganiko II" – 1:22
14. "Seeking Var I" – 3:26
15. "Dance Theme" – 4:30
16. "Le Mal Du Pays" – 1:16
17. "Nostalgia Song" – 1:38
18. "Solitude" – 2:21
19. "Adieu" – 2:18

== Personnel ==
- Eleni Karaindrou – composer

=== January 2008 ("Seeking" & "Dance Theme") ===
- Natalia Michailidou – piano
- Alexandros Myrat – conductor
  - Hellenic Radio Television Orchestra

=== March 2008 (tracks 1–8, 10–14 & 16–19) ===
- Eleni Karaindrou – piano (tracks 3, 6, 12, 19)
- Sergiu Nastasa – violin (tracks 1, 5, 7, 8, 11, 13 & 18)
- Renato Ripo – cello (2, 7, 10, 11, 13, 16 & 17)
- Maria Bildea – harp (tracks 1, 2, 5–8, 11 & 13)
- Vangelis Christopoulos – oboe (tracks 2, 6, 8, 10 & 17)
- Spyros Kazianis – bassoon (tracks 2, 6, 8, 10, 11, 17)
- Antonis Lagos – french horn (tracks 8 & 10)
- Dinos Hadjiiordanou – accordion (except tracks 1, 4, 14 & 17–19)
- Camerata – Friends of Music Orchestra (tracks 2, 4, 6, 14 & 19)
