= Beware Your Neighbour =

1951 novel

- First edition (UK)
- Author: Cecil Street
- Language: English
- Series: Desmond Merrion
- Genre: Detective
- Publisher: Collins
- Publication date: 1951
- Publication place: United Kingdom
- Media type: Print
- Preceded by: A Village Afraid
- Followed by: Murder Out of School

Beware Your Neighbour is a 1951 detective novel by the British writer Cecil Street, writing under the pen name of Miles Burton. It was part of a lengthy series of books featuring the detective Desmond Merrion and Inspector Arnold of Scotland Yard. Unlike much of the series it takes place in suburban rather than rural England. Reviewing the novel in The Spectator Esther Howard wrote " I always find that Mr. Burton has nearly the most colourless detectives, prose-style and plots of anyone in the business, and Beware Your Neighbour, death in an exclusive thoroughfare, though mechanically adequate, is entirely devoid of excitement."

== Synopsis ==
In the small prosperous street of Hallows Green a series of threatening letters are sent that appear to be leading up to a murder. Desmond Merrion is a friend of one of the residents and lends his assistance. When a murder is committed Arnold of the Yard arrives and they join forces to crack the case.

== Bibliography ==
- Evans, Curtis. Masters of the "Humdrum" Mystery: Cecil John Charles Street, Freeman Wills Crofts, Alfred Walter Stewart and the British Detective Novel, 1920-1961. McFarland, 2014.
- Herbert, Rosemary. Whodunit?: A Who's Who in Crime & Mystery Writing. Oxford University Press, 2003.
- Reilly, John M. Twentieth Century Crime & Mystery Writers. Springer, 2015.
