= Dark of the Moon: Poems of Fantasy and the Macabre =

Book by August Derleth

- Dust-jacket illustration by Smith-Wollin Studios and Frank Utpatel for Dark of the Moon
- Author: edited by August Derleth
- Cover artist: Smith-Wollin Studios and Frank Utpatel
- Language: English
- Genre: fantasy, horror, poetry
- Publisher: Arkham House
- Publication date: 1947
- Publication place: United States
- Media type: Print (Hardback)
- Pages: xvi, 418
- OCLC: 1298843

Dark of the Moon: Poems of Fantasy and the Macabre is a poetry anthology edited by August Derleth and published in 1947 by Arkham House in an edition of 2,634 copies. It is a pioneering anthology of odd poetry from the Middle Ages to the present, arranged chronologically.

A publishing curiosity is that this book had two different dustjackets – the only Arkham House book to have this feature. Both states of the jacket feature a background photograph of a mountain, although on the two jackets the image is reversed as compared with each other. The first-state jacket has lettering in green, whereas the second state jacket is lettered in orange and white. The jacket with the green lettering is the first state of the dustjacket (pictured right). Its lettering was rendered by Wisconsin artist Frank Utpatel. This state is the rarer of the two jackets, since a large number of the Utpatel jackets were destroyed by silverfish during storage.

The second state dust jacket, which features orange and white lettering, was redesigned by Gary Gore, who from 1959 on, became increasingly more active in working with August Derleth on Arkham House covers.

== Poets included ==
- William Blake
- Robert Burns
- James Hogg
- Sir Walter Scott
- Samuel Taylor Coleridge
- Thomas Moore
- Richard Harris Barham
- Johann Wolfgang von Goethe
- John Keats
- Thomas Lovell Beddoes
- Rabbi Ben Levi
- Henry Wadsworth Longfellow
- Edgar Allan Poe
- Alfred, Lord Tennyson
- William Bell Scott
- J. Sheridan Le Fanu
- Charles Kingsley
- Sidney Thompson Dobell
- William Allingham
- Charles Godfrey Leland
- Fitz-James O'Brien
- Dante Gabriel Rossetti
- James Thomson
- William Morris
- Richard Garnett
- Robert Buchanan
- Christina Rossetti
- A.P. Graves
- James Whitcomb Riley
- Lizette Woodworth Reese
- A. E. Housman
- José Asunción Silva
- Dora Sigerson Shorter
- Edwin Arlington Robinson
- Arthur Guiterman
- Walter de la Mare
- Amy Lowell
- Robert Frost
- Josephine Daskam Bacon
- Joyce Kilmer
- William Rose Benet
- Vincent Starrett
- Roy Helton
- H. P. Lovecraft
- Robert P. Tristam Coffin
- Clark Ashton Smith
- Timeus Gaylord
- Mark Van Doren
- Arthur Inman
- Stephen Vincent Benét
- Frank Belknap Long
- Yetza Gillespie
- Francis Flagg
- Dorothy Quick
- Robert E. Howard
- Donald Wandrei
- August Derleth
- Anthony Boucher
- Byron Herbert Reece
- Duane W. Rimel
- Mary Elizabeth Counselman
- Leah Bodine Drake
- Harvey Wagner Flink
- Coleman Rosenberger

== Publication history ==
- 1947, US, Arkham House OCLC 1298843, Pub date 1947, Hardback
- 1969, US, Books for Libraries Press ISBN 0-8369-6056-4, Pub date 1969
- 1976, US, Granger OCLC 2565352, Pub date 1976
