= Eternity and a Day (soundtrack) =

Soundtrack album by Eleni Karaindrou
- Released: 1998
- Recorded: March and April 1998
- Studio: Athens Concert Hall; Athens, Greece
- Genre: Film music
- Length: 40:47
- Label: ECM New Series; ECM 1692
- Producer: Manfred Eicher

Eleni Karaindrou chronology
Rosa, Wandering (1996)	Eternity and a Day (1998)	Trojan Women (2001)

Eternity and a Day is a soundtrack album by Greek composer Eleni Karaindrou recorded in March and April 1998 and released on the ECM New Series later that year, featuring music for the film of the same name by Theodoros Angelopoulos.

== Reception ==
The AllMusic review by Steve Huey awarded the album 4 stars stating "Impressively, the music stands well on its own, apart from the context of the film; that's the sign of a well-composed soundtrack."

Professional ratings
Review scores
Source	Rating
AllMusic	4/5 stars

== Track listing ==
All compositions by Eleni Karaindrou except as indicated

1. "Hearing the Time" – 3:08
2. "By the Sea" – 1:47
3. "Eternity Theme" – 2:18
4. "Parting A" – 1:31
5. "Depart and Eternity Theme" – 4:02
6. "Borders" – 2:41
7. "Wedding Dance" (Traditional) – 1:28
8. "Parting B" – 1:30
9. "To a Dead Friend" – 4:34
10. "Eternity Theme (Variation I)" – 1:48
11. "Depart and Eternity Theme (Variation I)" – 3:02
12. "Bus – Part I" – 1:08
13. "Depart and Eternity Theme (Variation II)" – 6:50
14. "Bus – Part II" – 0:56
15. "Trio and Eternity Theme" – 2:12
16. "The Poet" – 3:04
17. "Depart and Eternity Theme (Variation III)" – 2:34
18. "Depart" – 1:57

== Personnel ==
- Eleni Karaindrou – piano
- Vangelis Christopoulos – oboe
- Nikos Guinos, Manthos Halkias – clarinet
- Spyros Kazianis – bassoon
- Vangelis Skouras – french horn
- Aris Dimitriadis – mandolin
- Iraklis Vavatsikas – accordion
- Loukas Karytinos director
  - String Orchestra La Camerata Athens
