= Ulysses' Gaze (soundtrack) =

Soundtrack album by Eleni Karaindrou
- Released: January 9, 1995
- Recorded: December 1994
- Genre: Film music
- Length: 59:33
- Label: ECM New Series; ECM 1570
- Producer: Manfred Eicher

Eleni Karaindrou chronology
The Suspended Step of the Stork (1992)	Ulysses' Gaze (1995)	Rosa, Wandering (1996)

Ulysses' Gaze is a soundtrack album by Greek composer Eleni Karaindrou recorded in December 1994 and released on the ECM New Series the following year, featuring music for the Theodoros Angelopoulos film of the same name.

== Background ==
Ulysses’ Gaze, the album, is the third ECM recording to feature music written by Eleni Karaindrou for her countryman Angelopoulos. The first edition—issued under the title Music for Films—focused primarily upon the director’s Trilogy of Silence (Voyage to Cythera, The Beekeeper, and Landscape in the Mist); the second presented music written for The Suspended Step of the Stork, Angelopoulos’ critically-heralded 1991 film.

== Reception ==
The AllMusic review by Stacia Proefrock states, "Perhaps no previous Karaindrou score contains the evocative power of her compositions for Ulysses' Gaze, the film about memory, artistic quests, and war.... The theme associated with 'A', the central character who serves as the Ulysses of the film's title, is a constant repetitive framework upon which small vignettes of European folk music and elegiac song are built. The effect mirrors the film's journey across a portion of Europe torn apart by political divides and war, but more importantly provides small fragments of the pure images of peace and beauty that are so essential for Ulysses to find.."

Professional ratings
Review scores
Source	Rating
AllMusic	4.5/5 stars

== Track listing ==
The following tracks appear on the album.

All compositions by Eleni Karaindrou

1. "Ulysses' Theme" – 1:25
2. "Litany [Variation I]" – 3:12
3. "Ulysses' Theme [Variation I]" – 1:27
4. "Woman's Theme" – 1:09
5. "Ulysses' Theme [Variation II]" – 1:11
6. "Ulysses' Theme [Variation III]" – 1:33
7. "The River" – 4:57
8. "Ulysses' Theme" – 2:11
9. "Ulysses' Theme/Litany" – 6:54
10. "Ulysses' Gaze/Woman's Theme/Ulysses' Theme/Lento/Largo/Dance" – 17:20
11. "Byzantine Psalm" (Traditional) – 1:12
12. "Ulysses' Theme [Variation IV]" – 1:32
13. "Ulysses' Theme [Variation V]" – 1:30
14. "Ulysses' Theme [Variation VI]" – 3:33
15. "Ulysses' Theme/Lento/Largo" – 5:29
16. "Litany [Variation II]" – 3:29
17. "Ulysses' Theme [Variation VII]" – 1:31

== Personnel ==
=== Musicians ===
- Lefteris Chalkiadakis – conductor
  - Vangelis Christopoulos – oboe
  - Andreas Tsekouras – accordion
  - Sopcratis Anthis – trumpet
  - Vangelis Skouras – French horn
  - Christos Sfetsas – violoncello
  - Georgia Voulvi – voice

Kim Kashkashian — viola

=== Technical personnel ===
- Manfred Eicher – musical direction & producer
