= Ground for Suspicion =

1950 novel

- First edition (UK)
- Author: Cecil Street
- Language: English
- Series: Desmond Merrion
- Genre: Detective
- Publisher: Collins
- Publication date: 1950
- Publication place: United Kingdom
- Media type: Print
- Preceded by: Look Alive
- Followed by: A Village Afraid

Ground for Suspicion is a 1950 detective novel by the British writer Cecil Street, writing under the pen name of Miles Burton. It was part of a lengthy series of books featuring the detective Desmond Merrion and Inspector Arnold of Scotland Yard. Maurice Richardson writing in The Observer considered it " Readable enough in its old-fashioned, consequential style.".

== Synopsis ==
Looking for a break from crime-solving Merrion heads on holiday with his wife to the seaside town of Shellmouth. Before he has been there more than a few days, however, three suspicious deaths have occurred and with Scotland Yard called in he join with Arnold to solve the mysteries.

== Bibliography ==
- Evans, Curtis. Masters of the "Humdrum" Mystery: Cecil John Charles Street, Freeman Wills Crofts, Alfred Walter Stewart and the British Detective Novel, 1920-1961. McFarland, 2014.
- Herbert, Rosemary. Whodunit?: A Who's Who in Crime & Mystery Writing. Oxford University Press, 2003.
- Reilly, John M. Twentieth Century Crime & Mystery Writers. Springer, 2015.
