= Komninos Zervos =

Greek-Australian performance poet and teacher

Komninos Zervos (born 1950) is a Greek-Australian performance poet and teacher. He was born in Richmond, Melbourne.

== Life ==
Born in Melbourne in 1950, Komninos Zervos currently lives in Melbourne, Australia.

Komninos' poems are a playful combination of social commentary, autobiography and farce. He has performed poetry professionally in pubs, literary festivals, TV, radio, schools, streets, universities and prisons; published poetry in books, literary journals and anthologies; and authored animated and interactive multimedia poems for the internet. He is the recipient of numerous grants.

Komninos

== Awards ==
- 1991 Australian Human Rights and Equal Opportunity Commission Poetry Award for Komninos
- 1992 Australia Council/Ros Bower Community Artist of the Year.
- 1997 Prix Ars Electronica, Austria, .Net Award, Highly Commended.
- 2001 Electronic Literature Organisation Literature Award for poetry, Runner-up.

== Bibliography ==
- the komninos manifesto. (Fat Possum, 1985)
- the second komninos manifesto. (Fat Possum, 1986)
- the last komninos manifesto. (Koala Munga, 1987)
- high street, kew east. (Collins/Angus and Robertson, 1990). illust. Diana Reynolds.
- komninos. (UQP, 1991)
- the baby rap and other poems. (Oxford University Press, 1992). illust. Peter Viska.
- komninos by the kupful. (UQP, 1994)
- exercises in surrealism . (Koala Munga, 2008)
- manifesto 2008 - 2009. (Koala Munga, 2009)

== Articles on Komninos ==
- Geoff Page's A Reader's Guide to Australian Poetry, UQP, 1995, pages 161 - 164.
- William Wilde's Australian Poets and their Works: A reader's guide, Oxford, 1996, pages 140 - 141.
- Wilde, Hooton and Andrews The Oxford Companion to Australian Literature, 2nd edition, Oxford,1994, page 439.
