= FM Records LLC =

- FM Records Music LLC logo
- Founded: 2010
- Founder: Stephan Warren
- Genre: Pop-reggae, dubstep
- Country of origin: United States

FM Records LLC is an American-based record label specializing pop-reggae and dubstep music. FM Records is currently considered the market leader in pop-reggae recordings, having released albums and singles with Sinéad O'Connor, Musiq Soulchild, Syleena Johnson, Jon Secada, Sean Paul, Maxi Priest, Lee “Scratch” Perry, Inner Circle, Sean Paul, Marcia Griffiths, Cas Haley, Gregory Isaacs, Barrington Levy, JC Lodge, Sizzla, Chaka Demus & Pliers, Sister Nancy, Nadine Sutherland, Patra, Luciano, Ce'Cile, Beres Hammond, Wayne Wonder and Gyptian, among many others. The company also is known for proliferating the pop-reggae genre within the British and Canadian music industries, releasing hit singles with Canadian pop/R&B celebrities Divine Brown, Jesse Giddings, Elaine Shepherd, Dru, Ammoye, and British recording stars Janet Kay, Carroll Thompson, Adele Harley, Maddy Carty, Peter Hunnigale, Savage and Peter Spence.

== Pop reggae movement: 2011 to present ==
During September 2011, FM Records recorded the single "How About I Be Me" with rock star Sinéad O'Connor, in an effort to create a more commercial reggae sound. Since the release of "How About I Be Me," and its subsequent radio airplay, FM Records made a transition toward recording pop singers on reggae riddims, employing a greater proportion of uplifting, radio-friendly lyrics and commercial production techniques. In 2013, FM Records released pop-reggae music from a collection of American, Canadian and European pop stars, including Musiq Soulchild, Syleena Johnson, Sinéad O'Connor, Divine Brown, Elaine Shepherd, Dru and Jesse Giddings. FM Records is the executive producer of Musiq Soulchild and Syleena Johnson's full-length reggae LP, titled "9INE," which debuted at number one on the Billboard Reggae Albums Chart during the week of 12 October 2013. The 9INE LP was released 24 September 2013 by Shanachie Records. The Atlanta recording sessions for the "9INE" LP were featured on the TV One reality series, "R&B Divas," in which A&R / Producer For FM Records Music LLC appeared in two episodes. The first single from the 9INE LP, titled "Feel the Fire," was premiered on Billboard.com 15 May 2013, and was officially released 16 July 2013 on iTunes. The song entered the Top 100 on the iTunes R&B/Soul Singles Chart during the last week of July 2013.

== Awards and chart appearances ==
Streaminn Hub, Inc. (by way of FM Records) has been nominated for the Canadian JUNO Awards three times. In 2013, the Streaminn Hub, Inc. single "Radio," performed by Canadian pop-reggae singer Ammoye, was nominated for a JUNO Award in the "Reggae Recording of the Year" category. In 2014, the Streaminn Hub, Inc. singles, "Baby It's You," also performed by Ammoye, and "Love Collision," performed by Canadian pop singer Dru, were both nominated for JUNO Awards in the "Reggae Recording of the Year" category. Streaminn Hub, Inc's predecessor FM Records produced all ten tracks from Musiq Soulchild & Syleena Johnson's pop-reggae album, "9INE (Shanachie 2013)," which debuted at No. 1 on the Billboard Reggae Albums chart in October 2013.

=== Awards and chart appearances ===
Year	Artist	Title	Category	Achievement	Role
2013	Musiq Soulchild & Syleena Johnson	"Feel the Fire"	iTunes R&B Chart	No. 32	Producer
2013	Musiq Soulchild & Syleena Johnson	"9INE"	Billboard Reggae Chart	No. 1	Producer
2013	Ammoye	"Radio"	JUNO Awards	Reggae Recording of the Year nominee	Producer
2014	Ammoye	"Baby It's You"	JUNO Awards	Reggae Recording of the Year nominee	Producer
2014	Dru	"Love Collision"	JUNO Awards	Reggae Recording of the Year nominee	Producer
