= Shaunt Basmajian =

Canadian poet and author

- Born: 30 September 1950; Beirut, Lebanon
- Died: 25 January 1990 (aged 39), Canada
- Occupations: poet and author

Shaunt Basmajian (30 September 1950 – 25 January 1990) was a Canadian poet and author.

He was a co-founder of Old Nun Publications and was a member of the Parliament Street Library poetry group.

In 1986, he was attacked with a knife and robbed while he was driving a taxi. His right lung was punctured when a robber stabbed him. He died one year later when his heart lining collapsed.

== Bibliography ==
- 1972: Spare Change
- 1973: Quote Unquote
- 1974: The Horserace As The Analogy
- 1976: The Poem "In A Struggle with the Magnetic Source"
- 1980: Boundaries Limits & Space
- 1982: Surplus Waste and Other Poems
- 1983: 8 Irritations
- 1984: Other Channels (poetry anthology coëdited with Daniel Jones)
- 1985: Poets Who Don't Dance
- 1986: Options
- 1987: A Seduction-Poem For Miss January
- 1988: 3 poems
- 1988: Biased Analogies
- 1989: bfp(h)aGe (concrete poetry anthology coëdited with Brian David Johnston)
- 1990: I am/I'm
