= Roy Helton =

American poet and novelist

Roy Helton (April 3, 1886 – December 1977) was an American poet and novelist. His poems include "In Passing" and "Old Christmas Morning".

He was a poet, novelist, educator and public servant. He and his wife Anna Friend Watson and their sons Robert and Frank lived near Philadelphia, Pennsylvania. Helton taught at Friends Central School and worked for the Pennsylvania State Planning Commission. He wrote for the Atlantic Monthly and other magazines.

Oaks are the true conservatives;

They hold old leaves till summer gives

A green exchange.

— a passage from Come Back to Earth

== Works ==
His works include:

Poetry collections:

- Youth's Pilgrimage, 1915
- Outcasts in Beulah Land, 1918
- Lonesome Water, 1930
- Come Back To Earth, 1946

Novels:

- Jimmy Sharswood, 1924
- The Early Adventures of Peacham Grew, 1925 (with drawings by Edward Shenton)
- Nitchey Tilley, 1934 (published in UK as "Their Own Day")

Non-fiction:

- Sold Out To The Future (1935)
