= Dark Green, Bright Red =

1950 novel by Gore Vidal

- Cover of the first edition
- Author: Gore Vidal
- Language: English
- Genre: Political fiction
- Publisher: E. P. Dutton & Co., Inc., New York City
- Publication date: 1950
- Publication place: United States
- Media type: Print (hardback & paperback)
- Pages: 296
- ISBN: 0233989137
- Preceded by: A Search for the King
- Followed by: The Judgement of Paris

Dark Green, Bright Red is a novel by Gore Vidal, concerning a revolution headed by a former military dictator in an unnamed Central American republic. The book was first published in 1950 in the United States by E. P. Dutton. It drew upon Vidal's experiences living in Guatemala during the Guatemalan Revolution.

Vidal re-wrote a significantly shortened version of Dark Green, Bright Red in 1968. However, when the book was published in a new United Kingdom edition in 1995 by Andre Deutsch, the longer, original text was used.

== Plot summary ==
With the backing of a U.S. fruit company, a court-martialled American army officer and a French advisor, General Alvarez, a deposed Central American dictator mounts an attempted coup d'etat to regain power. The first part of the book is set mainly in jungle, but most of the military action takes place elsewhere. It was the first of Vidal's books to explore the idea that the United States was an imperialist country.

== Critical reception ==
The novel received mixed to negative reviews. Donald Barr in The New York Times called it "a sad waste of real narrative gifts and wit", while Kirkus Reviews considered it "[w]ell-written, with authentic atmosphere, ... but not up to the mark of [Vidal's] earlier work." Saturday Review deemed it "an interesting failure."
