= Muntazir Baba =

Pushto-language poet (1950–2018)

Muntazir Baba (1950 – 5 January 2018) was a Pushto-language poet. He died in January 2018 at the age of 68.

His works continue to resonate with readers, and his poetry is valued for its depth and impact.
