= The Parasites =

1949 novel by Daphne du Maurier

- First Canadian edition (Ryerson Press (publisher))
- Author: Daphne du Maurier
- Language: English
- Publication date: 1949
- LC Class: PZ3.D8916 Par

The Parasites is a novel by Daphne du Maurier, first published in 1949. The novel follows an emotionally entangled bohemian family, the Delaneys, who lead complex and frequently scandalous lives, and their strange relationships with one another. The book explores both their childhood and adult life, creating a circle seemingly closed to all outsiders. The world in which they live is sophisticated, gay, and sometimes tragic.

== Background ==
Daphne du Maurier began work on The Parasites in early 1949, taking inspiration from her time in the theatre world and from her family life. The novel was published in the fall.

== Plot summary ==
The novel follows the three children of the Delaney family—Maria, Niall, and Celia—from childhood to adulthood. Maria and Niall are not biologically related, conceived from their respective parents' previous relationships, whilst Celia is the legitimate offspring of Maria's father and Niall's mother. Pappy, as the trio call their father, was a singer, and their Mama a dancer.

Maria becomes a beautiful, successful actress, and wife of the Hon. Charles Wyndham. Niall Delaney writes the songs and melodies that everyone sings and plays. Celia, generous and charming, takes care of their father before his death, and delights in Maria's children. Between Maria and Niall there exists a strange affinity—sometimes physical, sometimes spiritual. They are both subtly aware of it, and so is Charles. Perhaps it was this that impelled Maria's husband to exclaim bitterly:

Parasites, that's what you are. The three of you. You always have been and you always will be. Nothing can change you. You are doubly, triply parasitic; first, because you've traded since childhood on that seed of talent you had the luck to inherit from your fantastic forebears; secondly, because none of you have done a stroke of honest work in your lives but batten on us, the fool public; and thirdly, because you prey on each other, living in a world of fantasy which bears no relation to anything in heaven or on earth.

== Critical reception ==
Though the novel sold well, it received several poor reviews from critics who found it overly titillating. These included John Betjeman of the Daily Herald, who criticized du Maurier's "heavy, dull and obvious sentences" and caused publisher Victor Gollancz to send him a rare rebuke. Ivor Brown of The New York Times Book Review, however, praised the book as "magnetic".
