= Invitation to an Inquest =

1950 novel

- Author: Richard Hull
- Language: English
- Genre: Mystery crime
- Publisher: Collins Crime Club
- Publication date: 1950
- Publication place: United Kingdom
- Media type: Print

Invitation to an Inquest is a 1950 mystery crime novel by the British writer Richard Hull. It was published by Collins Crime Club. Hull, a member of the Detection Club during the Golden Age, was known for his stories involving cynical, unpleasant protagonists. He was strongly influenced by Anthony Berkeley's Malice Aforethought. It was his penultimate work, followed by The Martineau Murders in 1953.

== Synopsis ==
Inspector Yarrow of Scotland Yard investigates the case of a drowned body recovered from the River Thames in London. Yarrow encounters his two unpleasant cousins and would happily pin a murder on either of them if he can find enough evidence to do so.

== Bibliography ==
- Hubin, Allen J. Crime Fiction, 1749-1980: A Comprehensive Bibliography. Garland Publishing, 1984.
- Magill, Frank Northen. Critical Survey of Mystery and Detective Fiction: Authors, Volume 1. Salem Press, 1988.
- Reilly, John M. Twentieth Century Crime & Mystery Writers. Springer, 2015.
