= Carl Deuker =

American writer

Carl Deuker (born August 26, 1950) is an author of young adult novels.

== Career ==
His first novel, On the Devil's Court, was published in 1989. Deuker's next book was Heart of a Champion.

== Other books ==
- Painting the Black (Houghton Mifflin, 1997)
- Night Hoops (Houghton Mifflin, 2000)
- High Heat (Houghton Mifflin, 2003)
- Gym Candy (Houghton Mifflin, 2007)
- Payback Time (Houghton Mifflin Harcourt, 2010)
