= A Village Afraid =

1950 novel

- First edition (UK)
- Author: Cecil Street
- Language: English
- Series: Desmond Merrion
- Genre: Detective
- Publisher: Collins Crime Club
- Publication date: 1950
- Publication place: United Kingdom
- Media type: Print
- Preceded by: Ground for Suspicion
- Followed by: Beware Your Neighbour

A Village Afraid is a 1950 detective novel by the British writer Cecil Street, writing under the pen name of Miles Burton. It was part of a lengthy series of books featuring the detective Desmond Merrion and Inspector Arnold of Scotland Yard.

== Synopsis ==
Five prominent members of the little village of Micheigreen gather for drinks coaching inn The Swan after a meeting of the Parish Council. The next day one of their number, wealthy businessman Norman Rother is found dead. While initial suspicion points at his dissatisfied younger wife Annette, the local police are flummoxed can call in the expertise of Merrion and Arnold.

== Bibliography ==
- Evans, Curtis. Masters of the "Humdrum" Mystery: Cecil John Charles Street, Freeman Wills Crofts, Alfred Walter Stewart and the British Detective Novel, 1920-1961. McFarland, 2014.
- Herbert, Rosemary. Whodunit?: A Who's Who in Crime & Mystery Writing. Oxford University Press, 2003.
- Hubin, Allen J. Crime Fiction, 1749-1980: A Comprehensive Bibliography. Garland Publishing, 1984.
- Reilly, John M. Twentieth Century Crime & Mystery Writers. Springer, 2015.
