= Leah Bodine Drake =

American poet

- Born: December 22, 1904; Chanute, Kansas, U.S.
- Died: November 21, 1964; Parkersburg, West Virginia, U.S.
- Occupations: Poet; writer; editor; critic
- Writing career
- Genres: poetry, Fantasy

Leah Bodine Drake (December 22, 1904 – November 21, 1964) was an American poet, editor, and critic.

== Early life and education ==
Leah Bodine Drake was born in Chanute, Kansas, in 1904. Her father was the oilman Thomas Hulbert Drake. According to the jacket material of her A Hornbook for Witches, "her choice of the macabre in poetry comes naturally, for her earliest memories include the tremendous silences of the Navajo country, the woods and swamps of the deep South, and tales of 'ha'nts' told by Aunt Coopie, a negro member of the household". Also, according to this jacket material, her "ancestral background is English, Irish, Welsh, and French, and the family tree includes Sir Francis Drake, Davy Crockett, and Jean Bodin, to whom she dedicated A Hornbook for Witches.

She attended Oakhurst School for Girls Cincinnati, Hamilton College for Women and Sayre College in Lexington, Kentucky. She briefly worked as a Billy Rose dancer in a revue at the Fort Worth, Texas Centennial Exposition in 1936-37. By then she was a published poet; her first poem for Weird Tales, "In the Shadows", appeared in the October 1935 issue. She was second only to Dorothy Quick in the number of poems she published with that magazine – nearly two dozen.

== Career ==
Drake's poems were published in many magazines including the Southern Literary Messenger, The Cornhill Magazine, Weird Tales, Nature, Commonweal, The Arkham Sampler, Country Bard, Wings, Talaria, The Beloit Poetry Journal, The Poetry Chapbook, Silver Star, The New Yorker, The Saturday Evening Post and The Saturday Review. She was also a regular contributor to The Atlantic Monthly. She received many awards from the Poetry Society of America.

Drake lived in the Evansville, IndianaTri-State for fifteen years and from 1941 to 1951 was a music and theater critic for the Evansville Courier. She was a member of the Vanderburgh Chapter, Daughters of the American Revolution and a board member of the Evansville Philharmonic Orchestra, for which she also edited the monthly newsletter The Baton.

Her "Ballad of the Jabberwock" won the Stephen Vincent Benét Ballad Contest in 1946 and appeared for the first time in print in the anthology Dark of the Moon, edited by August Derleth, along with seven other fantastic poems by Drake.

Her first book of poetry A Hornbook for Witches: Poems of Fantasy was published in 1950 by Arkham House. The jacket material of the book gives her main interests apart from poetry as "collecting books illustrated by Dulac and Arthur Rackham, walking in the woods, Dixieland jazz, the works of C.S. Lewis and, as Vice-President of Evansville's Animal Refuge, Inc, "rescuing dogs, cats and horses from what E.E. Cummings calls 'manunkind'." New York Times reviewer Orville Prescott described Drake as "a poet who writes in conventional rhyme schemes about very unconventional subjects" and noted the influence of Edna St. Vincent Millay on some of her poems.

She won the $100 Arthur Davison Ficke memorial award for sonnets. Her "Precarious Ground" won the Poetry Society's $300 first prize for the "best poem" published in any magazine in the English-speaking world in 1952.

Drake authored two short stories for Weird Tales, "Whisper Water" in May 1953 and "Mop-Head" in January 1954.

Her second collection of poetry was This Tilting Dust (Francestown, New Hampshire: Golden Quill Press, 1955), which won her the Borestone Mountain Poetry Award. She won this award a second time later in her career. This Tilting Dust was a Finalist in the National Book Foundation poetry awards for 1957.

Drake moved with her family to Henderson, Kentucky in 1953, where she became a special feature writer for the Henderson Gleaner and Journal

Following her mother's death in 1956, she and her father moved to Parkersburg, West Virginia, where she lived for the last seven years of her life and worked at a newspaper. From 1957 to 1958, she also worked as a poetry reviewer for The Atlantic Monthly.

Drake died of cancer a month and a day short of her 60th birthday. At the time of her death, she was working on a third collection of poetry which would have included 25 new poems together with a selection of poems from her second collection. This third collection, titled Multiple Clay, was never published under this name.

She also collaborated on a poetry anthology, The Various Light: An Anthology of Modern Poetry in English with esoteric philosopher Dr Charles A. Musès, which was published in Switzerland. (Lausanne: Aurora Press, 1964; 500 copies).

She was listed in Who's Who in Poetry and in the 1958 supplement to Who's Who in America.

Drake's poem of werewolves "They Run Again"' was reprinted in Peter Haining's anthology Weird Tales (Carroll and Graf, 1990).

== Bibliography ==
=== Collections ===
- A Hornbook for Witches (1950)
- This Tilting Dust (1955)
- Multiple Clay (prepared in 1964, but unpublished until included in The Song of the Sun)
- The Song of the Sun: Collected Writings (2020). Edited by David E. Schultz. Illustrated by Jason C. Eckhardt.

=== Shortfiction ===
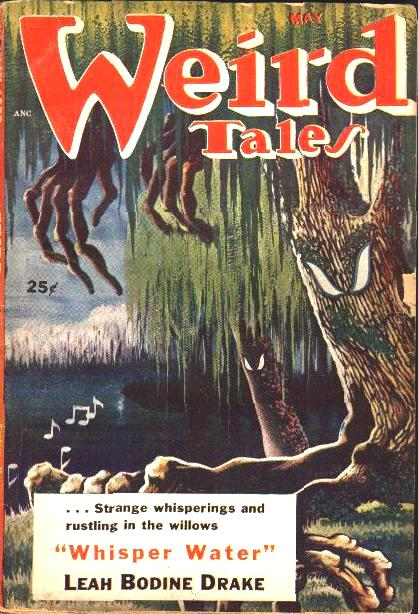
Drake's "Whisper Water" was the cover story in the May 1953 Weird Tales

- Mop-Head (1954)
- Foxy's Hollow (1953)
- Whisper Water (1953)
- Time and the Sphinx (1947)

=== Poems ===
- Leonardo Before His Canvas (1988)
- All-Hallows (1964)
- A Meeting on a Northern Moor (1961)
- The Witches (1961)
- The Pool (1961)
- A Warning to Skeptics (1961)
- New Wine in and Old Bottle (1960)
- We Move on Turning Stone (1957)
- The Word of Willow (1956)
- The Woods Grow Darker (1955)
- The Gods of the Dana (1954)
- The Jannigogs (1954)
- Out! (1954)
- Six Merry Farmers (1953)
- Red Ghosts in Kentucky (1953)
- The Mermaid (1952)
- Revenant (1951)
- The Centaurs (1950)
- Black Peacock (1950)
- Griffon's Gold (1950)
- Mad Woman's Song (1950)
- Old Daphne (1950)
- Midsummer Night (1950)
- Curious Story (1950)
- The Old World of Green (1950)
- The Window on the Stair (1950)
- Encounter in Broceliande (1950)
- Goat-Song (1950)
- Legend (1950)
- Terror by Night (1950)
- The Girl in the Glass (1950)
- Willow-Women (1950)
- House Accurst (1950)
- The Fur Coat (1950)
- Figures in a Nightmare (1950)
- The Last Faun (1950)
- The Man Who Married a Swan-Maiden (1950) (Variant Title: Swan-Maiden (1951))
- A Likely Story! (1950)
- Rabbit-Dance (1950)
- Mouse Heaven (1950)
- The Vision (1950)
- The Saints of Four-Mile Water (1949)
- The Heads on Easter Island (1949)
- The Unknown Land (1948)
- Unhappy Ending (1948)
- A Hornbook for Witches (1948)
- Old Wives' Tale (1948)
- The Stranger (1947)
- The Seal-Woman's Daughter (1947)
- The Ballad of the Jabberwock: A True Tale of Squankom Town (1947)
- The Steps in the Field (1947)
- Heard on the Roof at Midnight (1946)
- The Nixie's Pool (1946)
- The Path Through the Marsh (1944)
- Sea-Shell (1943)
- A Vase from Araby (1943)
- Changeling (1942)
- The Wood-Wife (1942)
- Haunted Hour (1941)
- Bad Company (1941)
- All-Saints' Eve (1940)
- The Tenants (1940)
- They Run Again (1939)
- Witches on the Heath (1938)
- The Witch Walks in Her Garden (1937)
- In the Shadows (1935)

=== Essays ===
- Abracadabra (1949)
- The Devil and Miss Barker (1949)
- Whimsy and Whamsy (1949)
- Gremlins (1948)

=== Reviews ===
- Peace, My Daughters (1949) by Shirley Barker
- Moonfoam and Sorceries (1949) by Stanley Mullen
- ...And Some Were Human (1949) by Lester del Rey
- Sometime Never (1948) by Roald Dahl

=== Other ===
Five letters printed in Weird Tales:

- Changed (January 1939)
- But We Did Reprint It (March 1939)
- A Horse Race (August 1939)
- A New Writing Technique (October 1939)
- "Howdy, Mr. Rabbit!" (March 1941)
