= Teresa Amy =

Uruguayan teacher, poet and translator

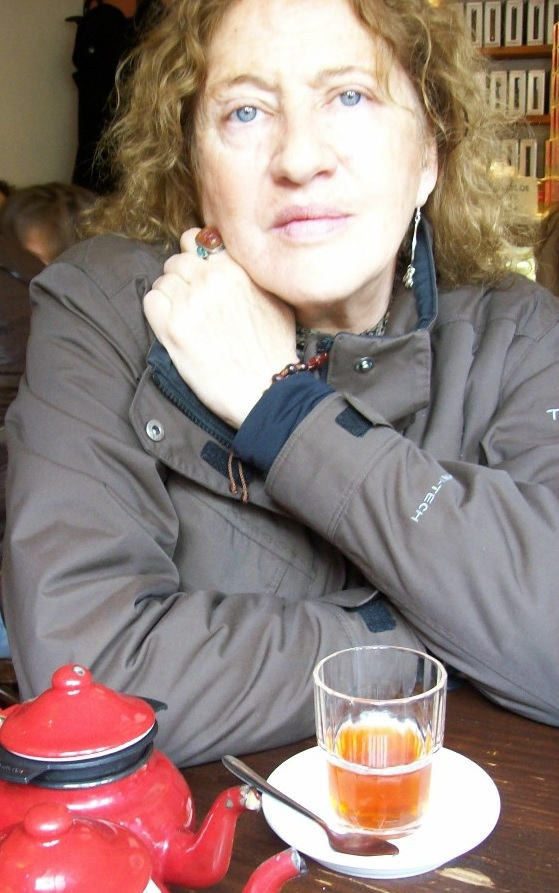
- Teresa Amy in Málaga, Spain in 2008
- Born: 15 October 1950; Montevideo, Uruguay
- Died: 30 January 2017 (aged 66); Montevideo, Uruguay
- Occupations: Teacher, poet, translator
- Spouse: Roberto López Belloso
- Awards: Annual Literature Award (2011)

Teresa Amy (15 October 1950 – 30 January 2017) was a Uruguayan teacher, poet, and translator.

== Biography ==
Teresa Amy was born in Montevideo on 15 October 1950. She studied linguistics and translation at the University of the Republic. She lived in Prague, Czech Republic for a year, and attended Charles University, where she studied Czech language and grammar for foreigners. She also earned a diploma in French language translation from Alliance Française.

In 1995 she published her first book of poetry, entitled Corazón de roble. She followed this in subsequent years with the collections Merodeador y otros poemas, Cuaderno de las islas, Cortejo Mínimo, Jade, and Brilla: 20 poemas para Marco, and her poems appeared in several Uruguayan and foreign anthologies.

As a translator, she completed the first Spanish editions of Czech poet Jan Skácel, and also translated works by Miloš Crnjanski and Vlada Urošević. She prepared a selection of Macedonian poets, Sobre el hilo que se llama tiempo, and the Czech poetry anthologies Animales silenciosos and 20 del XX. In 2011 she published the poetry collection Jade, which received an Annual Literature Award from the Ministry of Education and Culture. In 2013 she published Un huésped en casa, memorias de una traducción, in which she analyzes the craft of translation.

Amy coordinated live reading cycles in Montevideo, such as "Poesía cuerpo a cuerpo" and "7 poetas capitales", with the participation of Idea Vilariño, among others. She took part in international poetry festivals such as the Poetic Evenings of Struga (Macedonia, 2001), Salida al Mar (Buenos Aires, Argentina, 2010), and the Carlos Pellicer Cámara Ibero-American Poetry Encounter (Villahermosa, Mexico, 2016).

She worked as a French and Spanish language teacher at the Universidad del Trabajo del Uruguay.

She was married to the writer and journalist Roberto López Belloso.

Teresa Amy died in Montevideo on 30 January 2017.

== Critical reception ==
According to the critic and poet Alfredo Fressia, "Teresa Amy's original place in current Uruguayan poetry is that of polyphony – the union of the many voices that can fit on the written page, including that of a tradition in dialogue with Eastern Europe, together with the baroque of the concept, and the voice of erudition." Fressia adds: "It is impossible, indeed, not to admire her skill with language, the wise interruptions of the syntactic flow, and the ability to create a narrative with a succession of nominal groups, as in her poem 'Inventario mediterráneo', an economy of language comparable only to the famous 'Le message' by Jacques Prévert."

Fellow translator, critic, and poet Roberto Appratto considers Amy's writing "concise and intense, attentive to the variations of sound of a word in different parts of a verse", revealing a "fiber of a poet". In his opinion, "She arrived at her best in her latest books (Cortejo mínimo, Jade, and Brilla)."

== Works ==
- Corazón de roble (1995), poetry, Vintén Editor, ISBN 9789974570405
- Retratos del Merodeador y otros poemas (1999), poetry, Vintén Editor, ISBN 9789974570665
- La más larga de las noches (2002), translation – in collaboration with Alfredo Infanzón – of the work by Czech poet Jan Skácel, Editorial Ácrono, Mexico
- Lamento por Belgrado (2003), translation – in collaboration with Lazar Manojlovic – of Lament nad Beogradom by Serbian poet Miloš Crnjanski, Editorial Ácrono, Mexico
- Cuaderno de las islas (2003), poetry, Ediciones del Mirador, ISBN 9789974615069
- Cortejo Mínimo (2005), poetic work that also contains a translation of "Salón de la luna" by Macedonian writer Vlada Urošević, Artefato, ISBN 9789974790704
- Cincuenta poetas uruguayos del medio siglo (1955–2005) (2005), selection of Uruguayan poets, with prologue and notes by Gerardo Ciancio, Archivo General de la Nación, Centro de Difusión del Libro, Montevideo, ISBN 9789974360921
- Jade (2011), poetry, Yagurú, ISBN 9789974830240
- Un huésped en casa, memorias de una traducción (2013), Yagurú, ISBN 9789974839786
- Brilla: 20 poemas para Marco (2014), poetry, Yagurú, ISBN 9789974719071
- 20 del XX: poetas checos (2017), selection and translation of 20 Czech poets, La Otra and Universidad Autónoma de Nuevo León, Monterrey, ISBN 9786078167401
