= Canto General =

Book of poems by Pablo Neruda

- First edition
- Author: Pablo Neruda
- Translator: Jack Schmitt; 50th Anniversary Ed.
- Language: Spanish
- Series: Latin American Literature and culture
- Genre: Poetry
- Publisher: University of California Press
- Publication date: 1950
- Publication place: First edition: Mexico; English Translation U.S.
- English publication date: 1991, 1993, 2000
- Media type: Print Hardback and Paperback
- Pages: 407p
- ISBN: 0-520-22709-3
- OCLC: 45095554

Canto General is Pablo Neruda's tenth book of poems. It was first published in Mexico in 1950, by Talleres Gráficos de la Nación. Neruda began to compose it in 1938.

"Canto General" ("General Song") consists of 15 sections, 231 poems, and more than 15,000 lines. This work attempts to be a history or encyclopedia of the entire American Western Hemisphere, or New World, from a Hispanic America perspective.

== The XV Cantos ==
- First Canto. A Lamp on Earth.
- Second Canto. The Heights of Macchu Picchu
- Third Canto. The Conquistadors
- Fourth Canto. The Liberators
- Fifth Canto. The Sand Betrayed
- Sixth Canto. America, I Do Not Invoke Your Name in Vain
- Seventh Canto. Canto General of Chile
- Eighth Canto. The Earth’s Name is Juan
- Ninth Canto. Let the Woodcutter Awaken
- Tenth Canto. The Fugitive
- Eleventh Canto. The Flower of Punitaqui
- Twelfth Canto. The Rivers of Song
- Thirteenth Canto. New Year’s Chorale for the Country in Darkness
- Fourteenth Canto. The Great Ocean
- Fifteenth Canto. I Am

== The Heights of Macchu Picchu ==
"'The Heights of Macchu Picchu" (Las Alturas de Macchu Picchu) is Canto II of the Canto General. The twelve poems that comprise this section of the epic work have been translated into English regularly since even before its initial publication in Spanish in 1950, beginning with a 1948 translation by Hoffman Reynolds Hays in The Tiger's Eye, a journal of arts and literature published out of New York from 1947–1949, and followed closely by a translation by Waldeen in 1950 in a pamphlet called Let the Rail Splitter Awake and Other Poems for a publishing house in New York. The first mass-marketed commercial publication of the piece did not come until 1966 with Nathanial Tarn's translation, followed by John Felstiner's translation alongside a book on the translation process, Translating Neruda in 1980. Following that is Jack Schmitt's full translation of Canto General—the first to appear in English—in 1993. In recent years there have been several partial or full new translations: Stephen Kessler in 2001 for a photo/journey book on the ancient ruins (Machu Picchu edited by Barry Brukoff) and Mark Eisner's re-translation of seven of the twelve poems (Cantos I, IV, VI, VIII, X, XI, and XII) for an anthology celebrating the centennial of Neruda's birth in 2004, The Essential Neruda.

=== Chronological bibliography ===
- “Heights of Macchu Picchu,” Trans. by H. R. Hays. The Tiger’s Eye, 1.5, (1948). New York: Tiger’s Eye Publishing Co., 1947–1949. (112–122)
- Let the Rail Splitter Awake and Other Poems, 1950. Trans. Waldeen. Note by Samuel Sillen. New York: Masses & Mainstream.
- “Summits of Macchu Picchu,” Trans. by Ángel Flores, in Whit Burnett, ed., 105 Greatest Living Authors Present the World's Best Stories, Humor, Drama, Biography, History, Essays, Poetry New York: Dial Press, 1950. (356–367)
- The Heights of Macchu Picchu, 1966. Trans. Nathanial Tarn. New York: Farrar, Straus and Giroux; London: Jonathan Cape Ltd.
- The Heights of Macchu Picchu, trans. by Hower Zimmon, et al. Iowa City: Seamark Press, 1971.
- “The Heights of Macchu Picchu,” trans. Tom Raworth, in E. Cariacciolo-Tejo, ed., The Penguin Book of Latin American Verse Baltimore: Penguin, 1971.
- “Heights of Macchu Picchu,” trans. John Felstiner, in John Felstiner, Translating Neruda: The Way to Macchu Picchu Stanford, CA: Stanford University Press, 1980.
- The Heights of Macchu Picchu, trans. David Young. Baldon, Oregon: Songs Before Zero Press, 1986.
- Machu Picchu, trans. Stephen Kessler. Boston: Bullfinch Press, 2001.
- several poems from "The Heights of Macchu Picchu", trans. Mark Eisner in "The Essential Neruda: Selected Poems". San Francisco: City Lights, 2004.
- The Heights of Macchu Picchu, trans. by Tomás Q. Morín, Port Townsend: Copper Canyon Press, 2015.

== Musical versions ==
The "Canto General" has been set to music by several musicians.

=== Aparcoa ===
- "Canto General – Obra poetico musical" by Chilean folk band Aparcoa in collaboration with Pablo Neruda himself and with contributions by composers Sergio Ortega and Gustavo Becerra was staged on 5 December 1970 at the Teatro Municipal of Santiago de Chile. Canto General (Aparcoa album), by Chilean folk band Aparcoa, recorded various times between 1970 and 1974 and released in different countries in collaboration with narrators Mario Lorca (Chilean), Marés González (Argentinian), Gisela May (German), Humberto Duvauchelle (Chilean)

=== Mikis Theodorakis ===
- The best-known musical setting is by Mikis Theodorakis, a composer and politician from Greece. He completed four movements in 1973, recording these the following year. In 1975 and 1981, he expanded the work to seven and thirteen movements, respectively, recording the complete "oratorio" live in Munich in 1981. Vocals, in Spanish, on the incomplete 1974 recording are by Maria Farantouri and Petros Pandis.
- Canto General (Theodorakis) (1970–1981), oratorio by Mikis Theodorakis, recorded various times:
  - Canto General (1974 album), studio recording following the 1974 Paris première, incomplete (4 movements)
  - Canto General (1975 album), live recording from Piraeus and Athens, complete recording of the then-valid form of the oratorio (7 movements)
  - Canto General (1980 album), live recording from East Berlin (7 movements)
  - Canto General (1981 album), live recording from Munich, first recording of the complete oratorio (13 movements)
  - Canto General (1985 album), performed by the Hamburger Sängerhaufen (9 movements)
  - Canto General (1988 album), live recording from St. Paul, Minnesota (USA), first recording of the complete oratorio in the United States, conducted by Mikis Theodorakis and Stefan Sköld, soloists Mary Preus and Petros Pandis, produced by Patricia Porter and recorded by Ralph Karsten, from the July 27, 1986 performance in the O'Shaughnessy Auditorium of the College of St. Catherine (13 movements)
  - Canto General (1989 album), studio recording for a ballet performance, conducted by Loukas Karytinos (13 movements) in Berlin 1989 (Wergo 2CD)
- Orquestra de nuestra Terra and Chor der EÖ under Leopold Griessler 2014 (Gramola 2CD).

=== Los Jaivas ===
- Of no less importance is Alturas de Macchu Picchu (1982) on texts from The Heights of Macchu Picchu by the prominent Chilean rock band Los Jaivas; the rendering of "Sube a Nacer Conmigo Hermano" present in this album, a recording of the Canto XII from the "Heights of Macchu Picchu" section nearly in its entirety, is especially renowned.

=== Others ===
- Quilapayún Chante Neruda (1983) by Chilean Folk Band Quilapayún contains three songs based on lyrics from "Canto General."
- Swedish composer Allan Pettersson's "12th Symphony" (1974) uses the 3rd section ("Los muertos de la plaza (28 de enero de 1946. Santiago de Chile") of the 5th Canto ("La arena traicionada"), in Swedish translation, as its literary basis.
- "Canto General" (1974), by Dutch composer Peter Schat (1935–2003).
