= Canto General (Theodorakis) =

Oratorio by Mikis Theodorakis to texts by Pablo Neruda

- Oratorio by Mikis Theodorakis
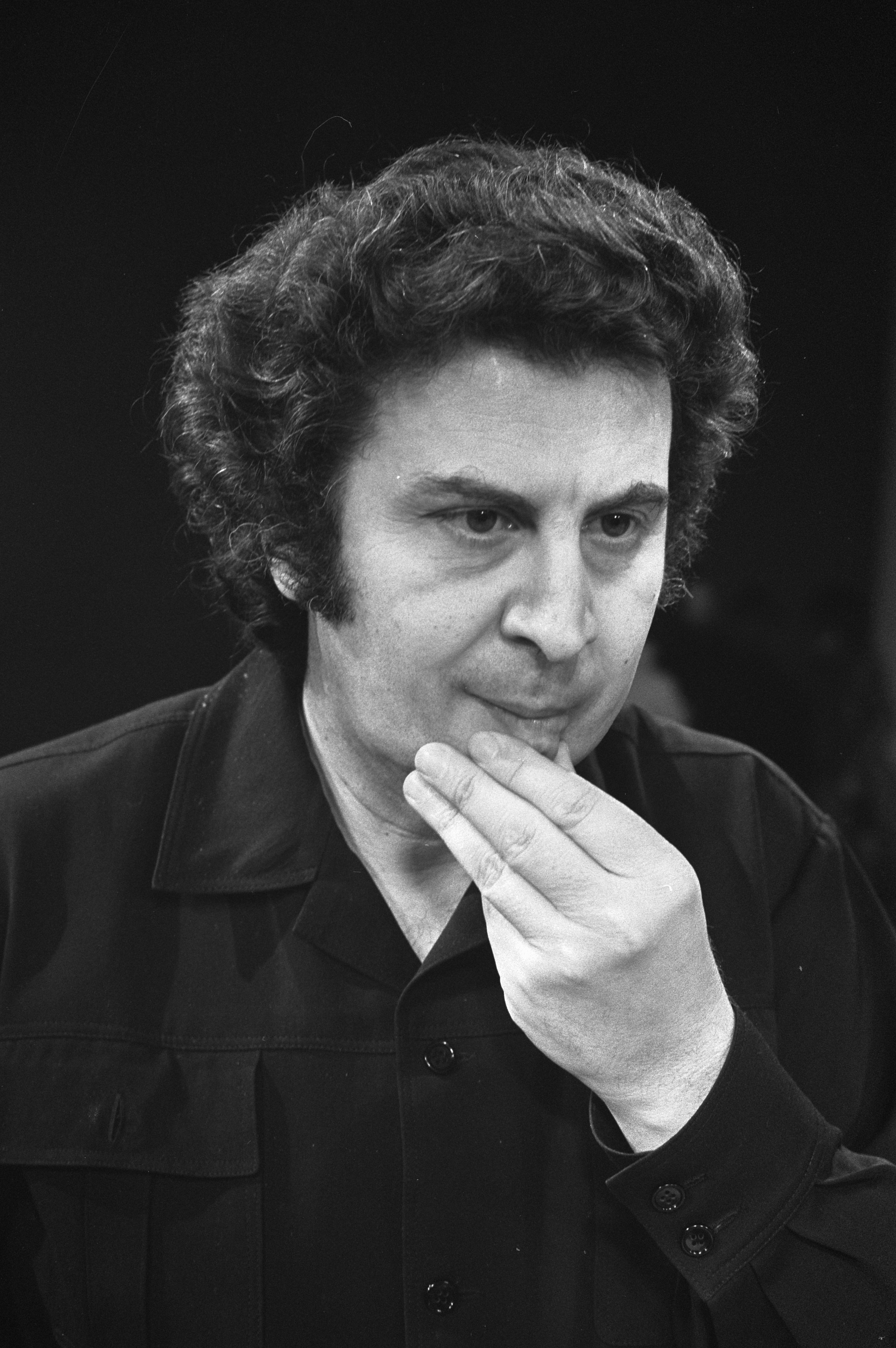
- Theodorakis in 1972
- Text: poems from Pablo Neruda's Canto General
- Language: Spanish; Greek; Latin
- Performed: 7 September 1974 (7 movements, Paris); 4 April 1981 (13 movements, East Berlin)
- Scoring: two solo voices; mixed choir; instrumental ensemble

Canto General is an oratorio for two solo voices, mixed choir and orchestra by Mikis Theodorakis setting texts from Pablo Neruda's cycle of poems Canto General (The Great Song) that covers nature and history of Latin America. The Greek composer and the Chilean poet, who shared political ideas and experiences of persecution, worked together in Paris from 1971 when the composer lived there in exile during the regime of the Greek junta and the poet was ambassador of Chile. The music was developed in three stages: the first version of seven poems was completed and premiered in 1974, the second, with a movement in memory of Neruda added, in 1976, and the final version expanded by five more poems in 1981. The music to the Spanish original text is intentionally accessible and features elements of Greek folk music.

== History ==
=== Neruda and the Canto General ===
Pablo Neruda was persecuted in his homeland Chile under the regime of Gabriel González Videla and had to go into hiding and exile. He wrote Canto General, beginning in the late 1930s, as a collection of more than 200 poems aiming at a reflection of Latin America's nature and history. It was first published in Mexico in 1950.

The poems cover plants, animals and the indigenous peoples, the European colonialists who subjugated them with unprecedented brutality, the liberation movements of the 19th century and the influence of international business interests in later centuries, leading again to rebellion. Neruda gave a voice to mountains, rivers and creatures, and to the ideas of liberty and independence.

=== Theodorakis ===
Mikis Theodorakis wanted to become a composer, but World War II and the following civil war were in the way; he was politically active and imprisoned several times, suffering hardship and torture. He achieved a completion of music studies at the Athens Conservatoire in 1951. After performances of his first orchestral works and especially new Greek songs, he studied further at the Conservatoire de Paris from the mid-1950s, including analysis with Olivier Messiaen. By the mid-1960s, he was recognised in Greece as the leading composer, able to give a new identity to its music, such as the 1964 film score 1964 Zorba the Greek which also made him internationally known. He returned to Paris several times.

=== Composition ===
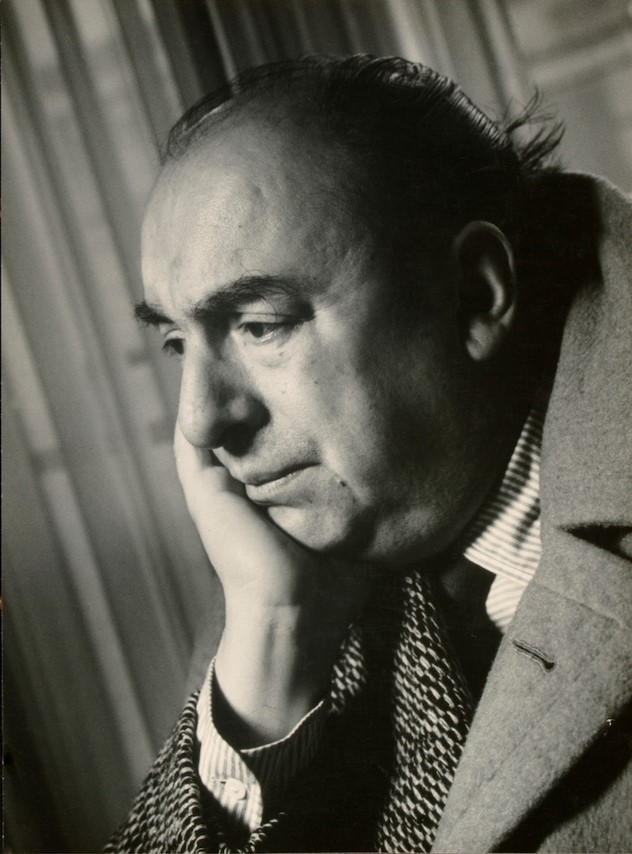
Neruda in 1967

Theodorakis met Neruda first on a 1964 trip to Paris, at a café of the Quartier latin. The two shared leftist ideas about politics, experiences of war and persecution, and ideals pursued without compromise. Both were ready to serve in public offices.

Under the Greek military junta that ruled from 1967, Theodorakis was again arrested and tortured. International supporters set him free in 1970, and he went to Paris in exile. At the time Neruda served as Chilean ambassador to France and officially invited him to Chile. There, Theodorakis heard a musical performance of the Canto General by the group Aparcoa in Valparaíso, and was inspired to write his own setting of some texts. He met President Salvador Allende in Chile, and later Neruda again in Paris, and requested a selection of poems from both. When he embarked on the composition in 1971, the year that Neruda was awarded the Nobel Prize, he noted:

Canto General is like a gospel of our time for me. Neruda reveals his combative soul and deliberately places himself at the service of the people's revolution for freedom, independence and democracy."

He began with setting the first poem of Canto to music, "Amor a América" (Love for America). By 1972 Theodorakis completed seven parts, which later became 1–3, 6, 9, 10 and 13. When Neruda attended rehearsals for it in Paris, together with his wife Matilde Urrutia, he was impressed and suggested to include other poems as well, such as "To Emiliano Zapata" and "Lautaro".

=== 1973 performances ===
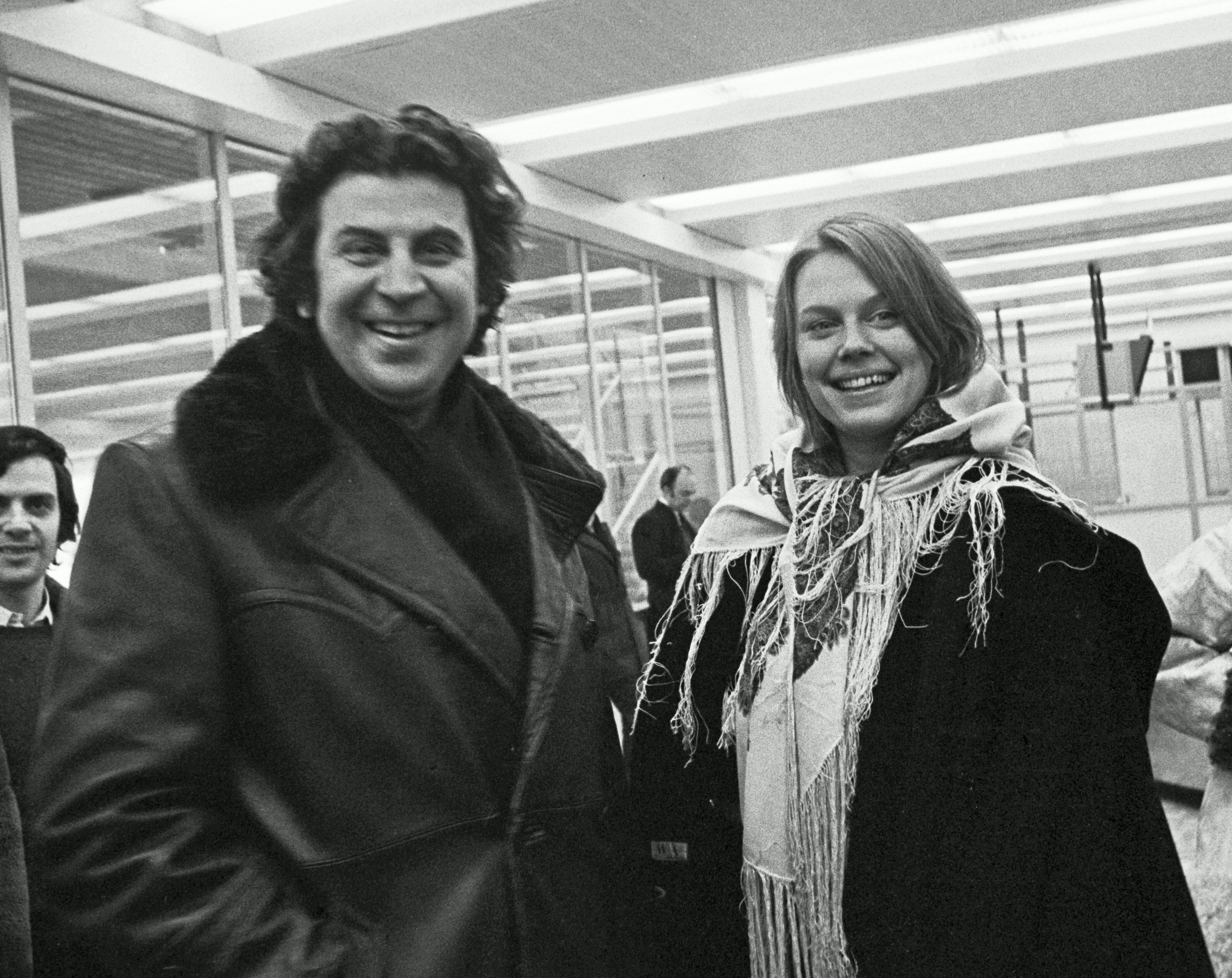
Theodorakis and singer Arja Saijonmaa in Helsinki 1972

Theodorakis planned a 1973 tour of the oratorio to several American countries, with the premiere in Santiago, Chile. The music was rehearsed by soloists and orchestra in Paris, where some movements were presented as a preview at a festival given by the newspaper L’Humanité. Some parts, still without choir, were performed at the Luna Park in Buenos Aires by singers Arja Saijonmaa and Petros Pandis and an orchestra with folk instruments. Neruda wanted to attend, but was not able to come for health reasons.

Theodorakis was informed that the premiere in Santiago had to be postponed due to political unrest, and moved on to Caracas, Venezuela. There, he received the news that a 1973 Chilean coup d'état on 11 September ended democracy in Chile and made the performance impossible. The planned venue, the Estadio Nacional de Chile, was later transformed into a prison camp by the military junta.

Neruda died of cancer a few days after the coup, on 23 September. Theorakis was then in Mexiko City, where a performance at the Palacio de Bellas Artes became a memorial for Neruda, and a call for freedom.

=== Expansion and later performances ===
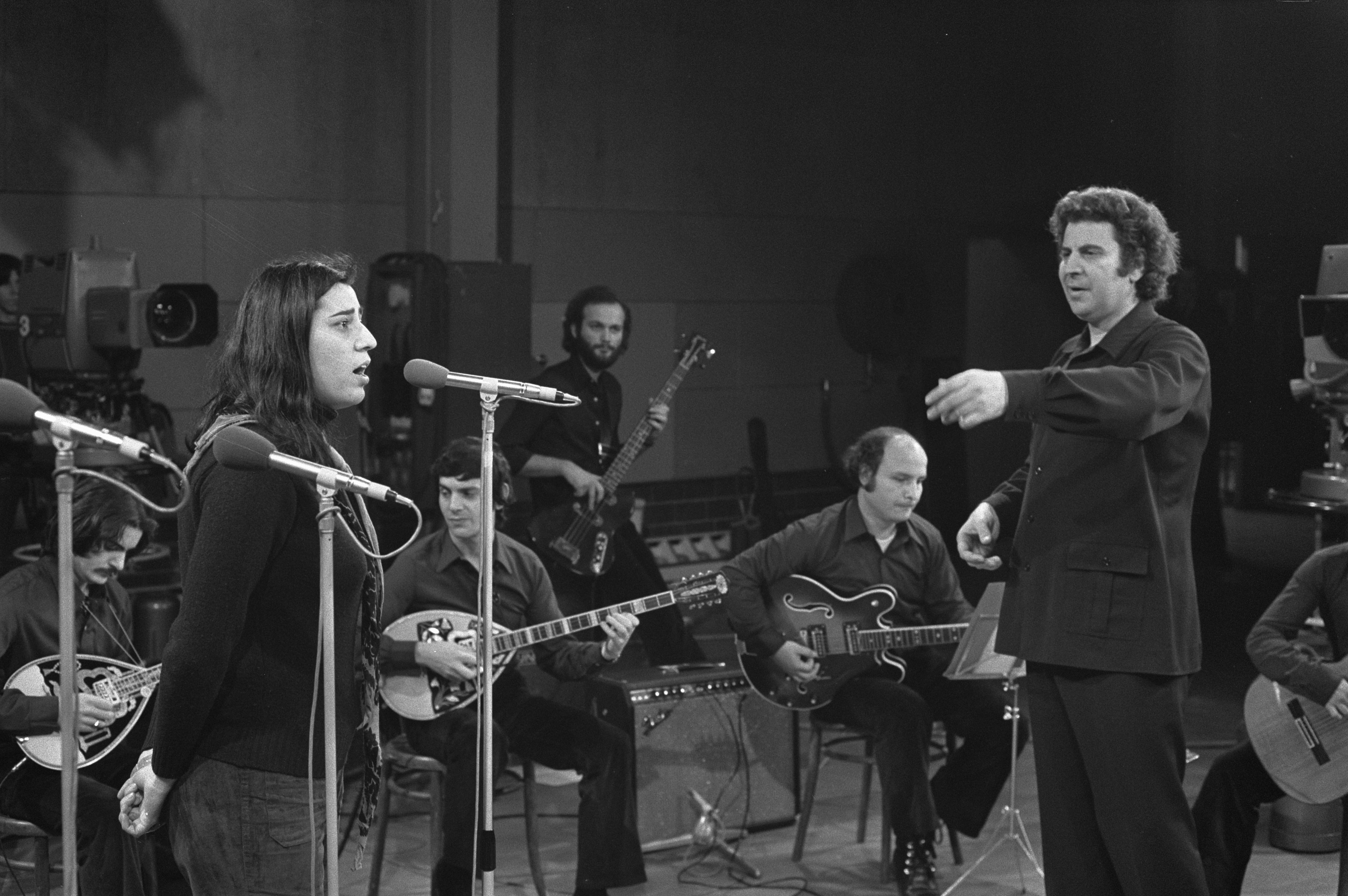
Theodorakis and singer Maria Farantouri, Nederlands, 1972

The world premiere of the first seven parts in a final version was performed in Paris on 7 September 1974. In 1975, after the fall of the Greek junta, Theodorakis returned to Greece. The Canto was first performed in Athens in August 1975, once in the Karaiskakis Stadium in Piräus, then at the Panathenaic Stadium in Athens, each time for an enthusiastic audience of tens of thousands people, with soloists Maria Farantouri and again Petros Pandis.

In 1976 Theodorakis added Neruda Requiem Aeternam to the Canto, setting his own text in memory of Neruda in Latin and Greek. The harmonies of this movement are more complex, and the tone is darker. Theodorakis completed the work from 1980 to 1981 by five parts, written in a more lyric mode than the earlier hymnic music. The first performance of the complete work, of about two hours, was on 4 April 1981 in East Berlin, as part of an annual international festival of political song. The composer conducted the concert. In 1989 the work was performed at the Palast der Republik in Berlin in a ballet version.

The first performance in Chile happened in April 1993 at the Teatro Monumental in Santiago, conducted by the composer and Franz-Peter Müller-Sybel, with soloists Saijonmaa and Pandis as in 1973, the Ars Viva and Sinfónico choirs of the University of Chile and the Chilean Symphony Orchestra and the Santiago Philharmonic Orchestra.

== Music ==
The work is a cantata or oratorio detailing Latin America's nature and history including the exploitation by colonial powers. Theodorakis retained the original Spanish language, while the orchestration of Canto General is oriented on traditional Greek music, represented by bouzouki, and also uses Latin American rhythms. The harmonies are simple and triadic, and the rhythms recall elements of Greek dances.

Canto General earned Theodorakis the reputation of being one of the most popular contemporary classical composers; he wanted to address large audiences and kept the music intentionally simple and easily comprehensible. The work is also a work in progress, responding to situations in different stages. The work is of a distinct animating character. The choral movements, sometimes in intensified dynamics, provide elements of demonstration and at times hymn singing. The music serves the texts that Neruda worded.

=== Structure ===
The oratorio in its final version is structured in 13 parts:

1. Algunas bestias (Some Animals)
2. Voy a vivir (1949) (I shall live)
3. Los libertadores (The liberators)
4. A mi partido (To my Party)
5. Lautaro (Lautaro)
6. Vienen los pájaros (The Birds Appear)
7. Sandino (Sandino)
8. Neruda Requiem Aeternam (Requiem for Neruda'') (poem by Theodorakis)
9. La United Fruit Co. (The United Fruit Co.)
10. Vegetaciones (Realms of Plants)
11. Amor América (1400) (Love of America)
12. A Emiliano Zapata – (To Emiliano Zapata)
13. América insurrecta (1800) (Uprising America'')

The duration is about 110 minutes.

=== Scoring ===
Canto General is scored for mezzo-soprano, baritone, mixed choir, 3 bouzoukis (or flutes), percussion (5 players), 3 guitars, 2 pianos, electric bass (or double bass).

=== Arrangements ===
Six parts of the composition were published in 1998 in an arrangement for soloists, choir and symphony orchestra by Henning Schmiedt and Jens Naumilkat. It was premiered in Linz that year with the Bruckner Orchester and the Chor Ad Libitum from St. Valentin, conducted by the composer. In 2005 Yannis Samprovalakis orchestrated a seventh part (Los Libertadores), which premiered on 24 March 2006, at the Concert Hall in Thessaloniki. The Thessaloniki State Orchestra and soloist Maria Farantouri performed conducted by Myron Michailidis.

== Recordings ==
- Theodorakis, Mikis (2010), Axion esti; Canto general; Liturgie Nr. 2; Sinfonie Nr. 3; Sadduzäer-Passion (in German), Hong Kong: Naxos Digital Services/Corona Classic Collection, OCLC 767863738
- Theodorakis, Mikis; Neruda, Pablo; Schilinski, Julia; Cattaneo, Sergio; Griessler, Leopold; Orquesta de Nuestra Tierra (2015), Canto general (in Spanish), Gramola Records, OCLC 930697700
- Theodorakis, Mikis; Farandouri, Maria; Pandis, Petros; Grimbert, Jacques; Neruda, Pablo; Percussions de Strasbourg; Chœur national (Paris, France). (1975), Canto general : cantate (in Spanish), France: Columbia : Pathe Marconi : EMI, OCLC 1368309253
- Theodorakis, Mikis; Saijonma, Arja; Ahlert, Bernd; Joseph, Dietmar; Sängerhaufen, Hamburger; Schleier, Irmgard; Afert, Jörg; Pandis, Petros; Schäfer, Stefan; Arp, Thomas; Stoiber, Walter, Pablo Neruda/Mikis Theodorakis, Canto General (in undetermined language), OCLC 1011432570
- The Athenians (gruppo musicale); Polychronis, Dimitris; Smirnios, Kostas; Gialeles, Antonis; Charokopos, Manolis; Tsilias, Thomas; ARC Music (2001), Canto General (in no linguistic content), West Sussex (GB): Arc Music, OCLC 1115310682
- Theodōrakēs, Mikēs; Neruda, Pablo; Pharanturē, Maria; Vogt, Heiner; Müller-Sybel, Franzpeter; Rundfunkchor Berlin (1995), Canto general [Oratorium für zwei Solostimmen, gem. Chor und Orchester] (in German), Berlin: Edition Barbarossa, OCLC 1183614142
