= Richard Hull (writer) =

English writer

- Born: Richard Henry Sampson; 6 September 1896; London, England
- Died: 19 April 1973 (aged 76); Pimlico, London, England
- Occupation: Novelist
- Writing career
- Pen name: Richard Hull, Henry Dickson
- Period: 20th century
- Genre: Fiction

Richard Henry Sampson FCA (6 September 1896 – 19 April 1973), known by the pseudonym Richard Hull, was a British writer who became successful as a crime novelist with his first book in 1934.

== Biography ==
Sampson was born at Kensington, London on 6 September 1896, son of Samuel Arthur Sampson, LL.D, a Trinity College, Cambridge-educated barrister of Lincoln's Inn (son of Samuel Sampson of Hendon, Middlesex, also a barrister of Lincoln's Inn), and Nina, daughter of Frederick S. Hull, of Liverpool. He was educated at Rugby School, Warwickshire, and entered the British Army at the age of eighteen with the outbreak of the First World War, serving as an officer in an infantry battalion and in the Machine Gun Corps. At the end of the war after three years in France he worked for a firm of chartered accountants in the early 1920s and then later set up his own practice. He moved into full-time writing in 1934 after the success of The Murder of My Aunt. In the Second World War, he was recalled to the army and became an auditor with the Admiralty in London, a position he retained until his retirement in the 1950s. While he ceased to write detective fiction after 1953, he did continue to take a close interest in the affairs of the Detection Club, assisting Agatha Christie with her duties as President. He was a Fellow of the Institute of Chartered Accountants in England and Wales (ICAEW). He died at his home, 32 Eccleston Square, Pimlico, London. His estate was valued at £133,006.

== Works ==
- The Murder Of My Aunt (1934)
- Keep It Quiet (1935)
- The Ghost It Was (1936)
- Murder Isn't Easy (1936)
- The Murderers Of Monty (1937)
- One Man's Holiday (1937) [written as: Henry Dickson]
- Excellent Intentions (1938) (title in US: Beyond Reasonable Doubt)
- And Death Came Too (1939)
- My Own Murderer (1940) (also titled: Murder By Invitation)
- The Unfortunate Murderer (1941)
- Left-Handed Death (1946)
- Last First (1947)
- Until She Was Dead (1949)
- A Matter Of Nerves (1950)
- Invitation to an Inquest (1950)
- The Martineau Murders (1953)
