= Syed Kawsar Jamal =

Indian poet, essayist and academic

Syed Kawsar Jamal is an Indian poet, essayist and academic. He was born in the village of Murshidabad, West Bengal, India on 24 October 1950.

His Chernobyler Megh was awarded Sopan Sahitya Puraskar and Ashalata Sahitya Puraskar. Jamal has three books of translation published by the National Book Trust, India. Besides, he has translated more than hundred French poems into Bengali for Bengali literary magazines.

== Biography ==
Syed Kawsar Jamal who was born in the village of Murshidabad, West Bengal, India on 24 October 1950, is an eminent poet and essayist in Bengali. He started writing from the early 1970s. He has been contributing his writings to the major literary journals in Bengali. His books of poems are Nasto Aranye Eucalyptus, Anya Aak Upatyaka, Chernobyler Megh, Nakshatra-Perek and Anupasthitir Adal Theke, 'Paramanabik Bijtala', 'Bisforonparbo'.

His Chernobyler Megh was awarded Sopan Sahitya Puraskar and Ashalata Sahitya Puraskar. Jamal's poems are characterized by an apparent simplicity but marked by a mystical myriad mind delving deep into the nature of human mind.

Jamal has three books of translation published by the National Book Trust, India. Besides, he has translated more than hundred French poems into Bengali for Bengali literary magazines.

Syed Kawsar Jamal did his Master's degree from the University of Calcutta and after a short stint in teaching in a higher secondary school joined All India Radio in 1978. A radio broadcaster by profession, he taught journalism and mass communication in Bharatiya Vidya Bhavan (1997-2000) and presently a guest lecturer in Visva-Bharati.

== His books of poems ==
Nasto Aranye Eucalyptus (1978), Anya Ak Upatyaka (1985), Chernobyler Megh (1993), Ramdhanumaya (1997), Nakhatraperek (2000), Anupasthitir Adal Theke (2005) Saswater medhakhoni(2010)

== Books of translation ==
Upendrakishor Roychoudhury (Lila Majumdar), Indian Literature : An Overview (Krishna Kripalini), A Village by the Sea (Anita Desai) French Poetry 1950-2000(Translation into Bengali language)

== Sources ==
- Who's Who of Indian Writers, published by Sahitya Akademi, New Delhi, 1999
