= Aldino Muianga =

Mozambican physician and writer (born 1950)

Aldino Muianga (born 1 May 1950) is a Mozambican physician and writer.

== Career ==
Muianga was born in Lourenço Marques. He studied surgery and he is the national coordinator of Mozambican Community Work. He is presently a professor in the field of medicine in the University of Pretoria, South Africa.

== Personal life ==
He is married to Carolina Teresa de Sousa. They have 3 children: Hugo Miguel Muianga, Aldino Frederico de Sousa Muianga, and Mick Ivan de Sousa Muianga.

== Awards ==
- Prémio Literário TDM, 2001
- Prémio Literário Da Vinci, 2003
- Prémio José Craveirinha de Literatura, 2009.

== Works ==
- Xitala Mati, (1987)
- Magustana, (1992)
- A Noiva de Kebera, (1999);
- Rosa Xintimana, (2001); (Prémio Literário TDM)
- O Domador de Burros, (2003); (Prémio Literário Da Vinci)
- Meledina ou história de uma prostituta,(2004)
- A Metamorfose, (2005)
- Contos Rústicos, (2007)
- Contravenção – uma história de amor em tempo de guerra, (2008), Prémio José Craveirinha de Literatura
