= La vida breve (novel) =

1950 novel by Juan Carlos Onetti

La Vida Breve (literally The Brief Life; published in English as A Brief Life) is a 1950 novel by Uruguayan novelist Juan Carlos Onetti. The novel takes place in Buenos Aires and in the mythical town of Santa Maria - a fictional town "between a river and a colony of Swiss workers", which first appears in this novel, but is also the main setting for many of Onetti's later novels. The plot follows Juan María Brausen, the "founder" of Santa Maria, and Diaz Grey, a countryside doctor and Brausen's fictional character.

== Plot ==
Juan María Brausen, a 40-year-old copy writer from Buenos Aires, is experiencing a midlife crisis when his wife of 5 years, Gertrudis, overgoes mastectomy. Brausen's longtime friend, Julio Stein, tells him the agency's boss, MacLeod, is about to fire him. In an attempt to save himself from financial ruin, Brausen, advised by Stein, attempts to write a movie script he could sell. Brausen, alone in his apartment in Calle Chile 600 (and later with his recovering wife) starts imagining the 40-year-old doctor Diaz Grey, in his clinic in the fictional town of Santa Maria, as he is visited by the seductive Elena Sala de Lagos, seeking morphine prescriptions for her addiction. Meanwhile, a prostitute nicknamed La Queca moves into the neighboring apartment. Brausen start listening to her conversations from across the wall and begins to imagine her apartment and life, until he eventually breaks in to her apartment and leaves without being seen. Brausen's life begins to dissolve as he keeps imagining Grey and Elena Sala in Santa Maria; his marriage falls apart and his wife, Gertrudis, leaves him, he is fired from the agency and slowly wastes his compensations. As his sanity fades away, Brausen enters La Queca's apartment and starts posing as Arce, a man who is a friend of La Queca's ex-boyfriend and later, using a different lie, as a man who saw La Queca at a bar and followed her home. The two begin a violent affair, during which they get drunk on gin and "Arce" beats La Queca. At some point, Ernesto, one of La Queca's lovers, finds him in her apartment and beats him up. Throughout their romance, Brausen's true identity as her neighbor is not revealed to La Queca. At some point, he hires an office space, steals one of La Queca's family photos and asks his friends to call him there during the day. A fictional "Onetti", modeled after the real author, briefly appears as an office-mate. Brausen begins to have more violent thoughts, imagining how he would kill Gertrudis and La Queca. He buys a gun and waits for the right time. However, before Brausen gets the chance to execute his plan, Ernesto kills her first. For an unknown reason, Brausen decides to help Ernesto escape, and the two flee Buenos Aires by train. However, Brausen leaves a note in La Queca's apartment, implicating Ernesto in the murder. The two escape to the fictional Santa Maria, where police agents find them. In an open ending, it is unclear what happens to Brausen.

In the meta-diegesis, Diaz Grey is convinced to help Elenea Sala and her husband, Lagos, find her missing paramour Oscar (The English), who escaped with their money. The two embark on a month-long journey, visiting a hotel, a country house and a bishop's house where Oscar has been. Grey lusts Elena, who taunts him and then sleeps with him for the first time the night before she mysteriously dies in bed. Following her death, Grey joins Lagos and Oscar in a plot to revenge her death by selling morphine prescriptions. The 3, accompanied by a young violinist, the daughter of the country house owner, finally appear in Buenos Aires the night before the carnival, using disguises to flee the police. Eventually, they are discovered and realize Lagos has not planned for their boat escape as he promised. Grey and the violinist, Annie, walk away into the night together, hinting at a possible new love affair. This conclusion, where Brausen loses himself in the fiction he created, and Grey takes his place in the real Buenos Aires, completes Brausen's desire to "become fiction".

Other characters include Julio Stein's longtime lover, the ex-prostitute Mami (Miriam), Gertrudis' sister, Raquel, and the "others"; fictional citizens of Santa Maria who appear at the end of the novel. The history of the characters is slowly revealed throughout the novel; Stein and Mami's life in Paris, a possible affair between Brausen and Gertrudis' younger sister Raquel in Montevideo, etc.

== Analysis and reception ==
The novel is considered one of Onetti's most celebrated works. Praised by critics, it did not, however, become popular with readers, perhaps for its complexity. Donald Shaw calls the novel the first novel of The Boom literary movement, which includes novels such as Hopscotch, One Hundred Years of Solitude and others.

Bart Lewis has stated that the text is a perfect example of the "auto-referential" character of Onetti's writing, due to its prominent themes; writing, creation, real life vs. fiction, the salvation of the writer through writing and the creative process.

Luis Eyzaguirre mentions that many of the fictional characters created by Brausen act as doubles or projections for the people in his life; Diaz Grey is Brausen, Elena Sala is Gertrudis, etc. "Brausen is unable to leave his world with Gertrudis, unable to penetrate the world he has created". Doctor Grey is essentially Brausen's representative or commissary in the land of Santa Maria, observing the life of Brausen's creations. In this context, Brausen serves as a God for Grey and for the people of Santa Maria, starting in La vida breve. Eyzaguirre further states that the model of the fictional universe of Santa Maria is a precursor to many other works in Hispano-American literature.

According to Catalina Gaspar, the novel creates a zone of "narrative ambiguity". Brausen, himself a fictional creation of Onetti, invents, on one plain, his own fictional creation – the doctor Diaz Grey (in the third person, 'he') and on another plain, Arce (in the second person, 'you'). But in the last episode of the novel, Grey moves to the first person, 'me'. Thus, the limits between the creator and his creation, an artifice, are lost and with them - the notion of reality. The narrator even defines himself in the novel as "I, the bridge between Brausen and Arce".

Some details in the story resemble biographic events from Onetti's life; he was married to the sisters María Amalia Onetti and later to María Julia Onetti and in 1945 he met the young Argentine-German violinist Dorothea "Dolly" Muhr, who would become his fourth wife. He also lived in Montevideo.
