= Frances Chung (poet) =

American poet

- Born: September 5, 1950; New York City
- Died: December 8, 1990 (aged 40)
- Citizenship: United States
- Education: Smith College
- Occupations: Poet, teacher
- Writing career
- Genre: Poetry
- Notable awards: The New York Times Company Foundation, New York Foundation for the Arts

Frances Chung (5 September 1950 – 8 December 1990) was an American poet.

== Early life and education ==
Frances Chung (born 1950) was born and raised in New York City's Chinatown, Manhattan. Chung attended Smith College for mathematics, joining the Peace Corps for two years after to serve in Central and South America. She later returned to New York City to teach the same subject in its public schools.

== Career ==
Her only collection, Crazy Melon and Chinese Apple: The Poems of Frances Chung, was compiled and released posthumously in 2000, edited by Walter K. Lew.

== Death ==
Chung died on December 8, 1990, of complications from cancer. While receiving surgery for a brain tumor and falling into a coma, doctors injected her with antibodies that she was allergic to, unbeknownst to them.

== Themes and influences ==
Chung's poems, with their snapshot-like qualities, are said to question conventional ideas of the onlooker's gaze, such as those of a tourist ethnic neighborhoods like New York's gentrifying Chinatown.

In his New York Times review of Crazy Melon and Chinese Apple, Michael Hainey wrote that William Carlos Williams was a possible influence for Chung's "compact and oddly moving narratives." Publishers Weekly also cites similarities to Carlos in Chung's poems' "generosity, unorthodox line-breaks and beauty."

== Works ==
- Crazy Melon and Chinese Apple: The Poems of Frances Chung (Wesleyan Poetry Series). Wesleyan University Press. 2000. ISBN 9780819564153.
