= Eleni Karaindrou =

Greek composer

- Born: 25 November 1939 (age 86); Teichio, Phocis, Greece
- Occupation: Composer
- Years active: 1967 – present

Eleni Karaindrou (Greek: Ελένη Καραΐνδρου; born 25 November 1939) is a Greek composer. She is best known for scoring the films of the Greek director Theo Angelopoulos.

== Biography ==
Karaindrou moved with her family to Athens when she was eight years old, and she studied piano and theory at the Hellenikon Odeion (Hellenic Conservatory). She also attended history and archaeology classes at the university. During the time of the Greek military junta of 1967–1974 she lived in Paris, where she studied ethnomusicology and orchestration, and improvised with jazz musicians. Then she began to compose popular songs.

In 1974 she returned to Athens where she established a laboratory for traditional instruments and broadcast a series on ethnomusicology on Radio 3 of the Greek national broadcasting company. In 1976 she started collaborating with ECM Records. This was a period of high productivity for her, during which she worked extensively on music for the theater and the cinema. Karaindrou has stated that her style emerged in working on soundtracks and that the relationship between images and movements created a new space for her to express emotions.

Her first soundtrack album was released in 1979 for the movie Periplanissi by Christoforos Christofis. In 1982 she won an award at the Thessaloniki International Film Festival and was noticed by Theo Angelopoulos, who was serving as president of the jury. Karaindrou collaborated with the Greek director on his last eight films, from 1984 to 2008.

Karaindrou is very prolific. By 2008 she had composed music for 18 full-length movies, 35 theatrical productions and 11 TV series and television movies. Among the screen directors she has worked with are Chris Marker, Jules Dassin, and Margarethe von Trotta. In 1992 she received the Premio Fellini award. Recently, her compositions "Elegy for Rosa" and "Refugee's Theme" were featured prominently in the 2015 blockbuster film Mad Max: Fury Road.

On November 9, 2012, her compositions were part of the concert “Music and songs for the films of Theo Angelopoulos”, co-organized by the 53rd Thessaloniki International Film Festival and the Thessaloniki State Symphony Orchestra in the context of the tribute hosted by the Festival to the Greek filmmaker.

In 2021 she was awarded the Lifetime Achievement Award of the Ghent Festival's World Soundtrack Awards.

== Discography ==
- Tous des Oiseaux - ECM 2019
- David - ECM 2016
- pothoi kato apo tis leukes; gliko pouli tis niotis - mikri arktos 2016-2017
- Music for the Small Screen - Original Recordings [1976-1989] - Mikri Arktos 2014
- Medea - ECM 2014
- Concert in Athens (live) - ECM 2013
- Dust of Time - ECM 2009
- The 10 (Greek TV: "το 10") - Mikri Arktos/ECM 2008
- Elegy of the Uprooting (live) - ECM 2005; Also released as DVD
- The Weeping Meadow - ECM 2004
- Trojan Women (album) - ECM 2001
- Eternity and a Day - ECM 1998
- Rosa, Wandering - Lyra 1996
- Ulysses' Gaze - ECM 1995
- The Suspended Step of the Stork - ECM 1992
- Music for Films - ECM 1991
- The Suspended Step of the Stork - Minos 1991
- Unreleased Recordings - Minos 1991
- L'Africana - Minos 1990
- Herod Atticus Odeon (live) - Minos 1988
- Landscape in the Mist - Milan 1988
- The Beekeeper - Minos 1986
- Happy Homecoming, Comrade - ECM 1986
- Voyage to Cythera - Minos 1984
- The Price of Love - Minos 1983
- Music and songs for the theater, mikri arktos, 1983 -1993
- The Great Vigil - Minos 1975
