= Bomarzo (disambiguation) =

Bomarzo may refer to:

== Places and jurisdictions ==
- Bomarzo, a town and comune of the province of Viterbo, Italy
  - Gardens of Bomarzo, a garden in Bomarzo
- the former Roman Catholic Diocese of Bomarzo, now a Catholic titular see

== Arts ==
- Bomarzo (novel), a 1962 novel by Manuel Mujica Láinez
- Bomarzo (opera), a 1967 opera by Alberto Ginastera based on the above novel
- Bomarzo (film), a 1949 documentary by Michelangelo Antonioni
