= Gardens of Bomarzo =

Garden and sculpture complex in Italy

- Sacred Grove
- Sacro Bosco
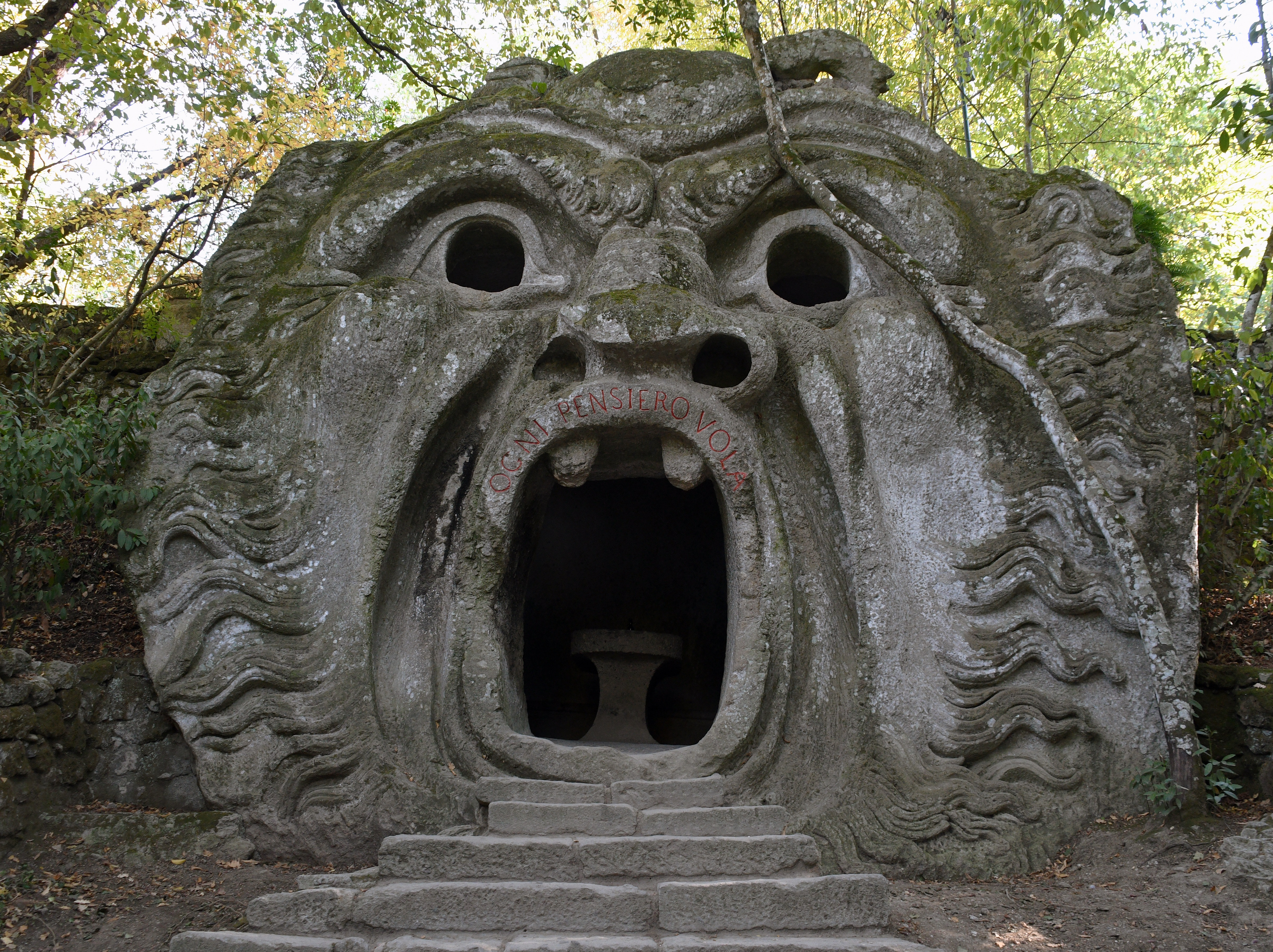
- Orcus mouth

- Location within Italy
- Location: Bomarzo, Italy
- Coordinates: 42°29′29.88″N 12°14′51.27″E
- Created: 16th century
- Designer: Pirro Ligorio

The Sacro Bosco ("Sacred Grove"), colloquially called Park of the Monsters (Parco dei Mostri in Italian), also named Garden of Bomarzo, is a Mannerist monumental complex located in Bomarzo, in the province of Viterbo, in northern Lazio, Italy.

The garden was created during the 16th century. The design is attributed to Pirro Ligorio, and the sculptures to Simone Moschino. Situated in a wooded valley bottom beneath the castle of Orsini, it is populated by grotesque sculptures and small buildings located among the natural vegetation.

== History ==
The park's name stems from the many larger-than-life sculptures, some sculpted in the bedrock, which populate this predominantly barren landscape. It was commissioned by Pier Francesco Orsini, called Vicino, a 16th-century condottiero, and patron of the arts, greatly devoted to his wife Giulia Farnese (not to be confused with her maternal great-aunt Giulia Farnese, the mistress of Pope Alexander VI). When Orsini's wife died, he had the gardens constructed to cope with his grief.

During the 19th century, and deep into the 20th, the garden became overgrown and neglected, but after the Spanish painter Salvador Dalí made a short movie about the park and completed a painting actually based on the park in the 1950s, the Bettini family implemented a restoration program which lasted throughout the 1970s. Today, the garden, which remains private property, is a major tourist attraction.

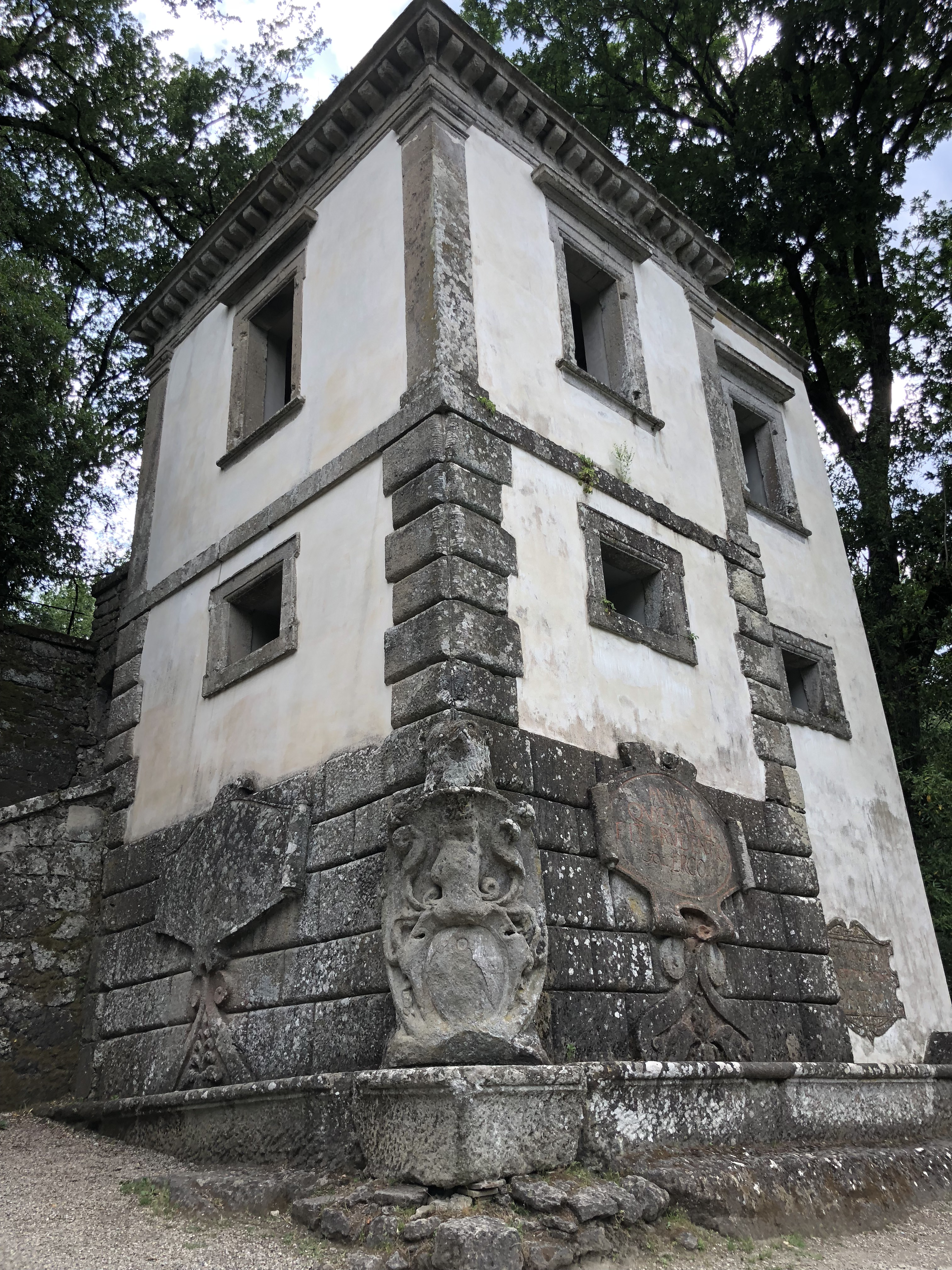
The Leaning House

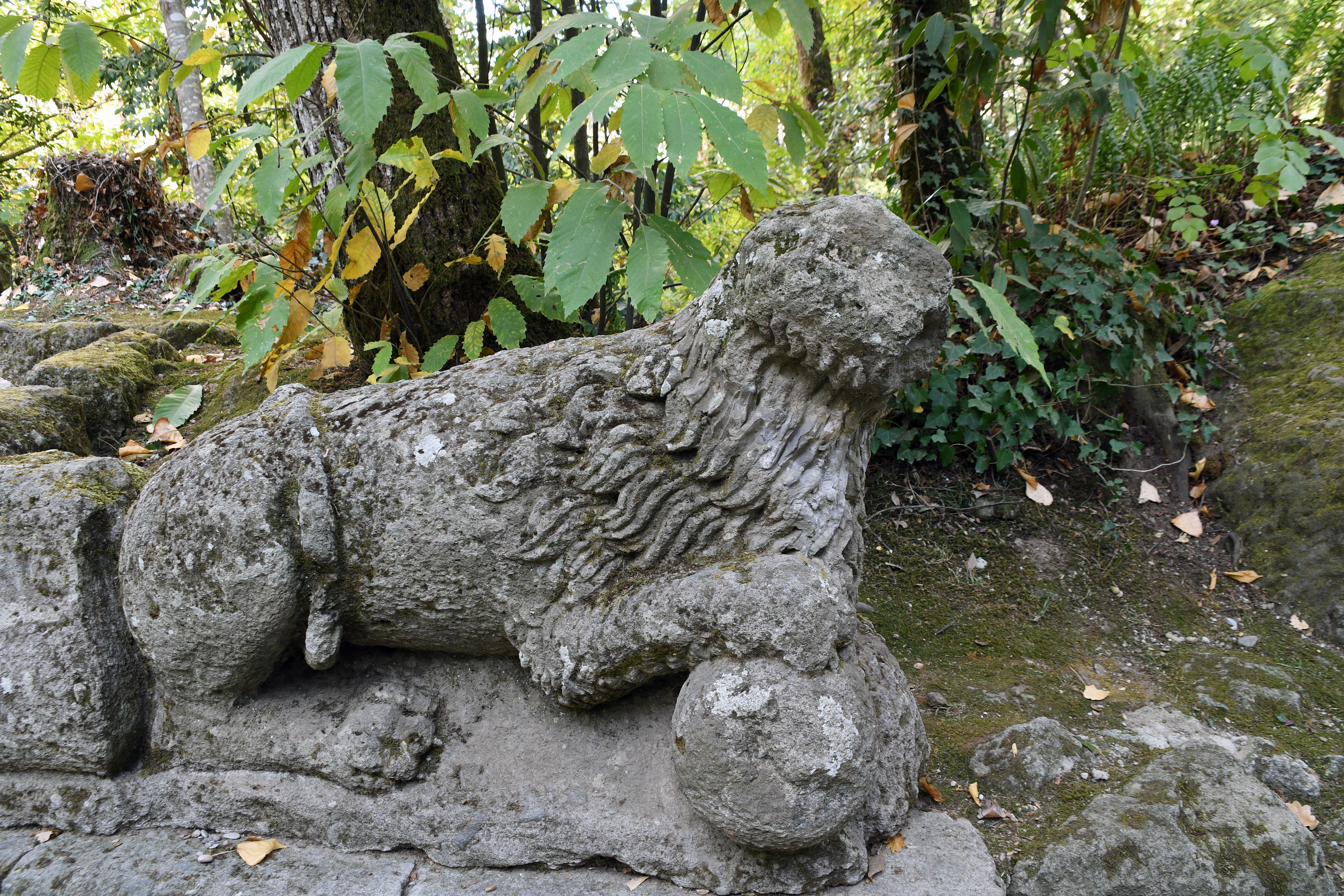
Lion sculpture

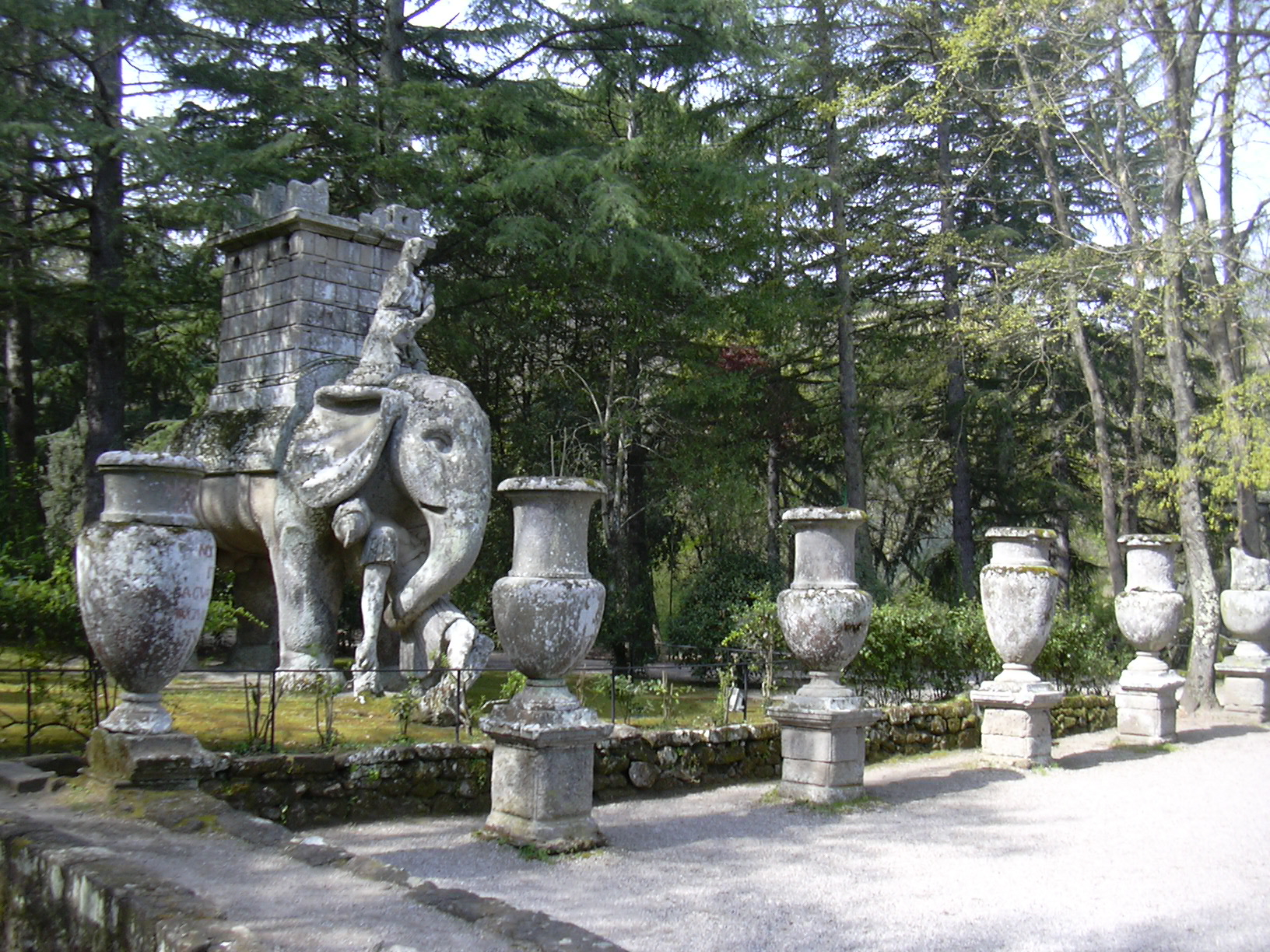
Elephant

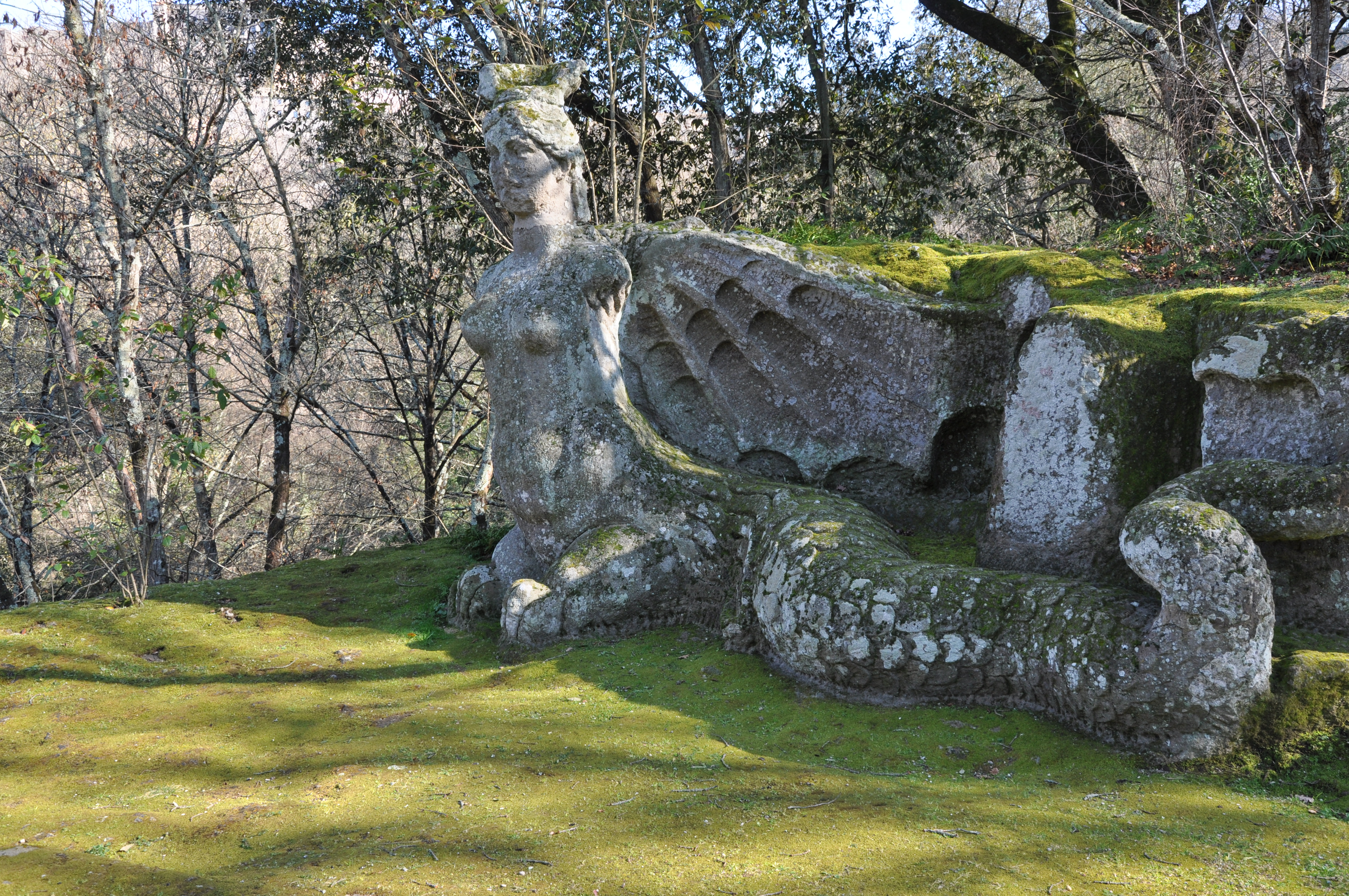
Fury

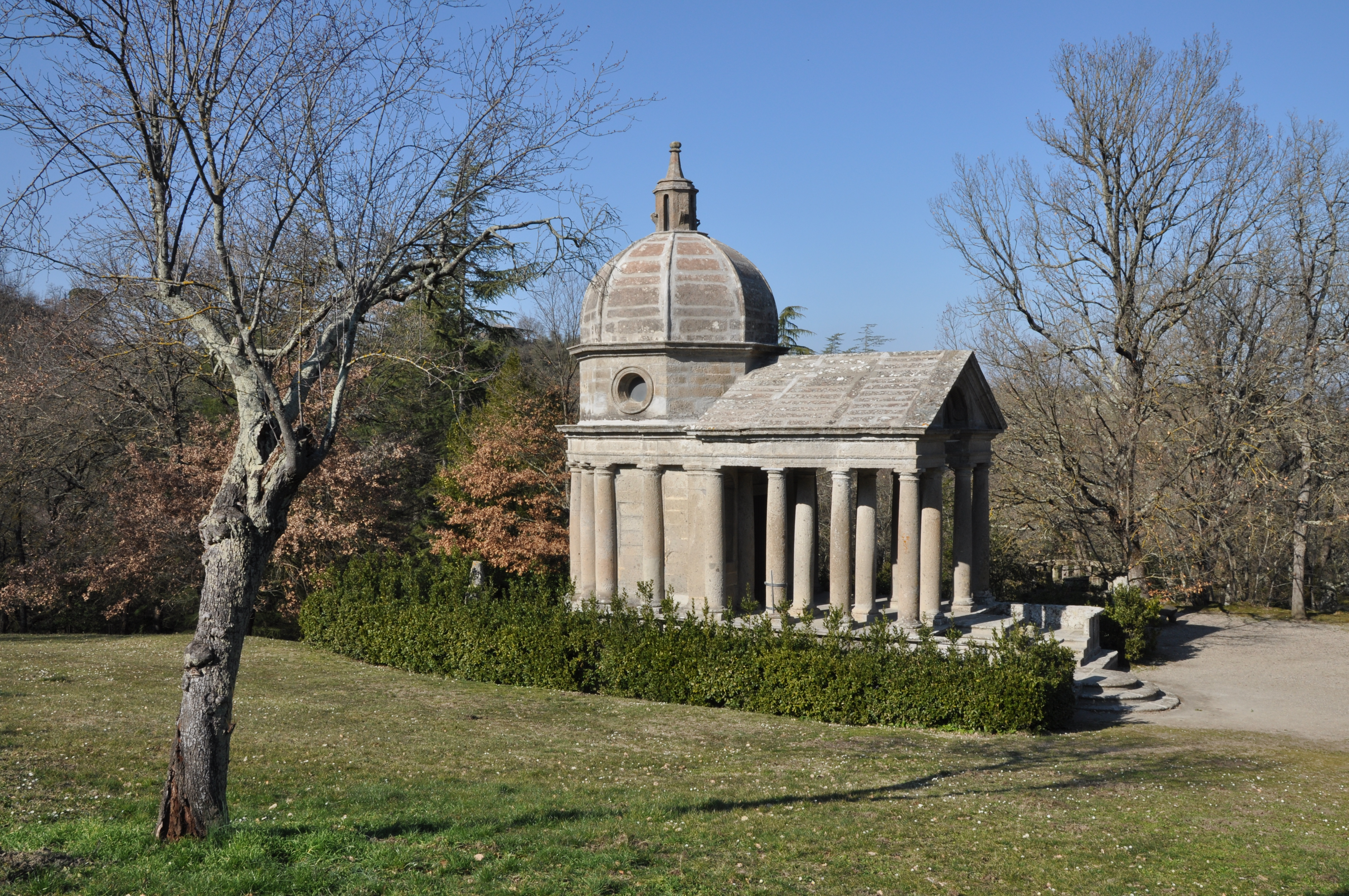
Temple

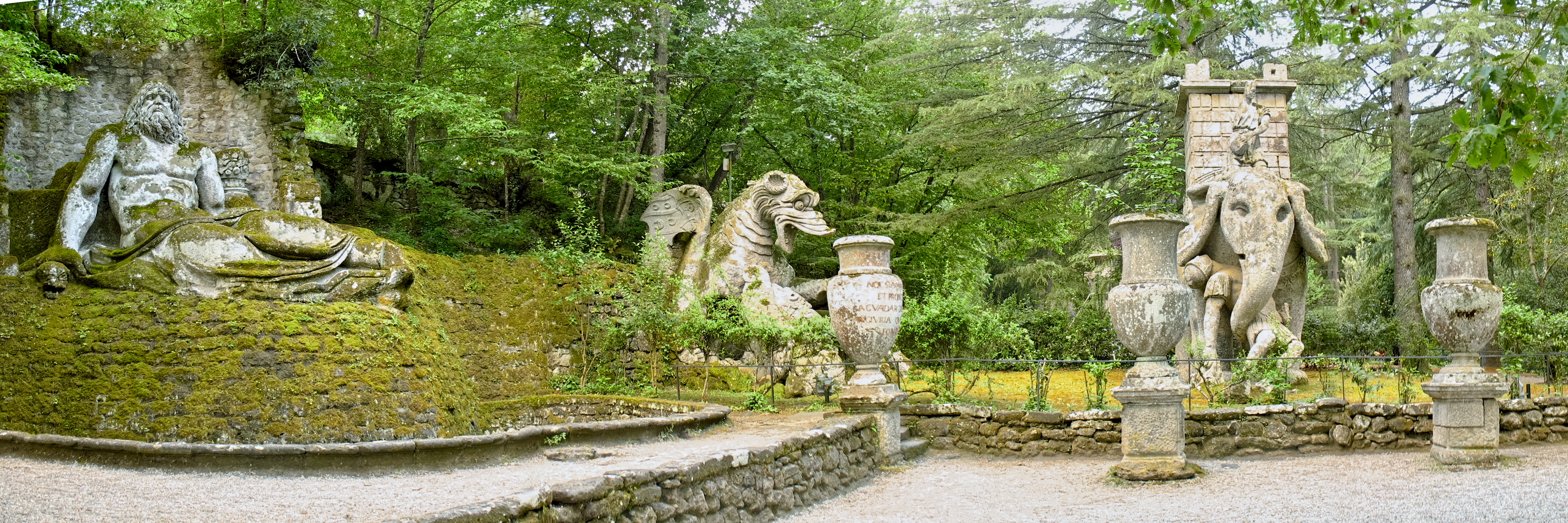
Panorama

== Description ==
=== Style ===
The park of Bomarzo was intended not to please, but to astonish, and like many Mannerist works of art, its symbolism is arcane: examples are a large sculpture of one of Hannibal's war elephants, which mangles a Roman legionary, or the statue of Ceres lounging on the bare ground, with a vase of verdure perched on her head.

The many monstrous statues appear to be unconnected to any rational plan, and appear to have been strewn almost randomly about the area, sol per sfogare il Core ("just to set the heart free") as one inscription in the obelisks says.

Allusive verses in Italian by Annibal Caro (the first one is of him, in 1564), Bitussi, and Cristoforo Madruzzo, some of them now eroded, were inscribed beside the sculptures.

The reason for the layout and design of the garden is largely unknown; Liane Lefaivre thinks they are illustrations of the romance novel Hypnerotomachia Poliphili. Perhaps they were meant as a foil to the perfect symmetry and layout of the great Renaissance gardens nearby at Villa Farnese, and Villa Lante. Next to a formal exit gate is a tilting watchtower-like casina, the so-called Casa Pendente ("Leaning House").

=== Sculptures ===
- A fountain called Pegasus, the winged horse
- Two sirens, probably Proserpina, wife of Pluto
- Orcus with its mouth wide open and on whose upper lip it is inscribed "OGNI PENSIERO VOLA" ("All Thoughts Fly"), which is illustrated by the fact that the acoustics of the mouth mean that any whisper made inside is clearly heard by anyone standing at the base of the steps. Art historian Luke Morgan describes this sculpture as "The Hell Mouth" and notes that people dined in it, producing the effect of simultaneously eating and being eaten; this duality is representative of 16th century "monsters" in Italian gardens. The Hell Mouth is also only a fragment of a whole body, and thus grotesque.
- A whale
- Two bears
- A dragon attacked by lions
- Proteus with weapons of Orsini
- Hannibal's elephant catching a Roman legionary
- Cerberus
- A turtle with a winged woman on its back
- A small theater of Nature
- A giant who brutally shreds a character
- A triton in a niche
- Two Ceres, sitting and standing
- A sleeping nymph
- Aphrodite
- The giant fruit, cones and basins

=== Monuments ===
- The Leaning House: dedicated to cardinal Cristoforo Madruzzo, who was a friend of Vicino Orsini and his wife.
- The Temple of Eternity: memorial to Giulia Farnese, located at the top of the garden, it is an octagonal building with a mixture of classical, Renaissance and Etruscan genres. It currently houses the tombs of Giovanni Bettini and Tina Severi, the owners who restored the garden in the twentieth century.

== Legacy ==
- The surreal nature of the Parco dei Mostri appealed to Jean Cocteau and Salvador Dalí, who discussed it at great length.
- The poet André Pieyre de Mandiargues wrote an essay devoted to Bomarzo.
- Niki de Saint Phalle was inspired by Bomarzo for her Tarot Garden, Giardino dei Tarocchi.
- The story behind Bomarzo and the life of Pier Francesco Orsini are the subject of a novel by the Argentinian writer Manuel Mujica Láinez, Bomarzo (1962). Mujica Láinez himself wrote a libretto based on his novel, which was set to music by Alberto Ginastera (1967). The opera Bomarzo premièred in Washington in 1967, since the Argentine government had condemned it as sexually offensive.
- A reimagined version of the garden is the centerpiece of the novel A Green and Ancient Light, written by Frederic S. Durbin.
- Some scenes from the 1985 Frankenstein film The Bride starring Sting and Jennifer Beals were shot amidst the statuary at the Garden.
- A fight scene in the 1985 film The Adventures of Hercules takes place here and the Orcus' mouth acts as an entrance to a cave.
- The Dutch painter Carel Willink used several of the park's statue groups in his paintings, e.g. Equilibrium of Forces (1963), The Eternal Cry (1964), To the Future (1965) and Landscape with a Nuclear Reactor (1982).
- A replica of the Orcus mouth appears as a major setpiece in the 1997 film The Relic.
- In the 1999 film version of Alice in Wonderland, the grotto in the scene involving Gene Wilder as the Mock Turtle is composed of sculptural features copying the garden at Bomarzo.
- The Orcus mouth appears in the 1964 Italian horror film Il castello dei morti vivi (also known as Castle of the Living Dead).
- The history and the mysteries of the gardens are featured in the 2015 board game "Bomarzo" by Stefano Castelli.
- The Orcus mouth features on the cover of Anna von Hausswolff's 2020 album All Thoughts Fly.
- Orcus is featured on the album cover for Billy by American rapper Ill Bill
- The Orcus mouth is shown in a brief scene in Terrence Malick's 2011 film, The Tree of Life.

== See also ==
- Villa Palagonia
- Sala Keoku
- Buddha Park
- Hypnerotomachia Poliphili
- Palazzo Orsini (Bomarzo)

== Sources ==
- (in Italian) Publication on Bomarzo site
- (in Italian) Publication on Bomarzo site - Images
- (in French) Hella Haase, Les jardins de Bomarzo, Seuil, Paris 2000
- (German) Richtsfeld, Bruno J.: Der "Heilige Wald" von Bomarzo und sein "Höllenmaul". In: Metamorphosen. Arbeiten von Werner Engelmann und ethnographische Objekte im Vergleich. Herausgegeben von Werner Engelmann und Bruno J. Richtsfeld. München 1989, S. 18 - 36.
- (in French) Jessie Sheeler, Le Jardin de Bomarzo - Une énigme de la Renaissance, Actes Sud, Arles 2007
- (in Italian) Calvesi M., Gli incantesimi di Bomarzo. Il Sacro Bosco tra arte e letteratura, Milano, Bompiani, 2000
- (in English) Morgan, Luke, The Monster in the Garden: The Grotesque and the Giganti in Renaissance Landscape Design, University of Pennsylvania Press 2016, Philadelphia
