= Giacomo del Duca =

Italian sculptor and architect

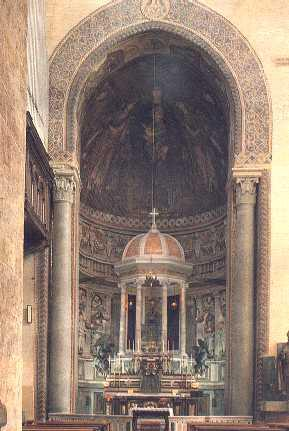
Chapel of the Sacrament, Messina, by Giacomo del Duca

Giacomo Del Duca (c. 1520 – 1604) was an Italian sculptor and architect during the late-Renaissance or Mannerist period. He is most remembered for assisting Michelangelo in a number of projects in Rome, including the sculpture and construction of the tomb of Pope Julius II, completed in a highly truncated state relative to the original design, in San Pietro in Vincoli. He also modified Michelangelo's plans for buildings in the Capitoline Hill, one of the most famous and highest of the seven hills of Rome.

Also known as Jacobo Siciliano or Jacopo Del Duca, Giacomo del Duca was born in Cefalù, Palermo, Sicily, Italy. He also participated in the decoration of Porta Pia (1562) in Rome; the construction of the Palazzo Cornaro for the cardinal Alvise Cornaro; the construction of the Villa Mattei al Celio; and the completion of the nave substructure for the church of Santa Maria di Loreto (1573–1576). He helped design the church of Santa Maria in Trivio (1575). He also helped sculpt the tomb of Elena Savelli (1570) in San Giovanni in Laterano. In 1588, Del Duca returned to Sicily, and settled in Messina, where he completed a number of late mannerist structures, such as San Giovanni dei Gerolamini and the Loggia dei Mercanti. He died in Messina.

Jacopo del Duca is a character in Manuel Mujica Láinez's Bomarzo, a novel about the Orsini family and its sacred grove of monsters.
