= Palazzo Orsini (Bomarzo) =

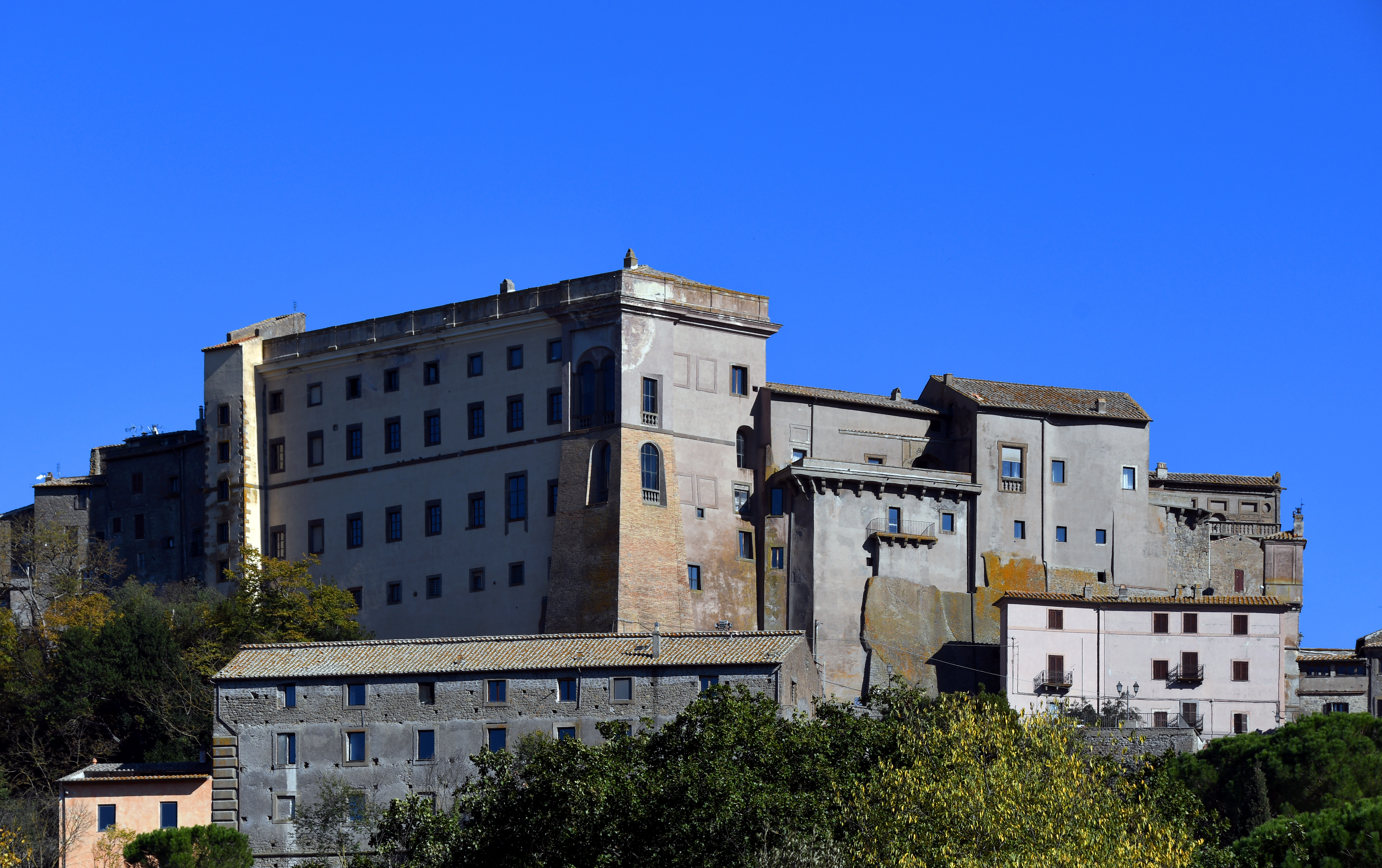
- The palace and Bomarzo
- Interactive map of the Palazzo Orsini (Bomarzo) area

General information
- Status: In use
- Type: Palace
- Architectural style: Mannerist
- Location: Bomarzo, Lazio, Italy
- Coordinates: 42.491283°N 12.251252°E
- Construction started: 16th century
- Renovated: 16th–19th centuries

Design and construction
- Architect: Baldassarre Peruzzi

The Palazzo Orsini is a defensive and residential structure located in the municipality of Bomarzo. Built from the 16th century on the remains of an older medieval castle, it was later remodelled until the end of the 19th century.

== History ==
=== The Orsini ===
In 1519 Giovanni Corrado Orsini, lord of Bomarzo, commissioned the Sienese architect Baldassarre Peruzzi to design a new palace on the structure of a wing of the town's old castle. The following year, following the second marriage of Gian Corrado to Clarice Orsini, the work received new impetus under the direction of Peruzzi himself and his half-brother, the painter Pietro Antonio di Andrea.

The work, however, was not yet finished in 1526, so much so that in his will Giovanni Corrado instructed his sons to finish it. In fact, following his death (1535), the project was taken over by his second son Pier Francesco, called Vicino. To his efforts we owe the loggia and the flat in the gallery, originally intended for him and his wife, Giulia Farnese, now used as the town hall.

After the death of the Farnese the two sons and their respective wives settled in the palace: on the ground floor of the Peruzzi wing settled Corradino and Margherita Sabella; on the first floor Marzio and Porzia Vitelli. The coats of arms of the Orsini and Vitelli families and the castles of their respective families, painted by Orazio Bernardo di Domenico, can still be admired today.

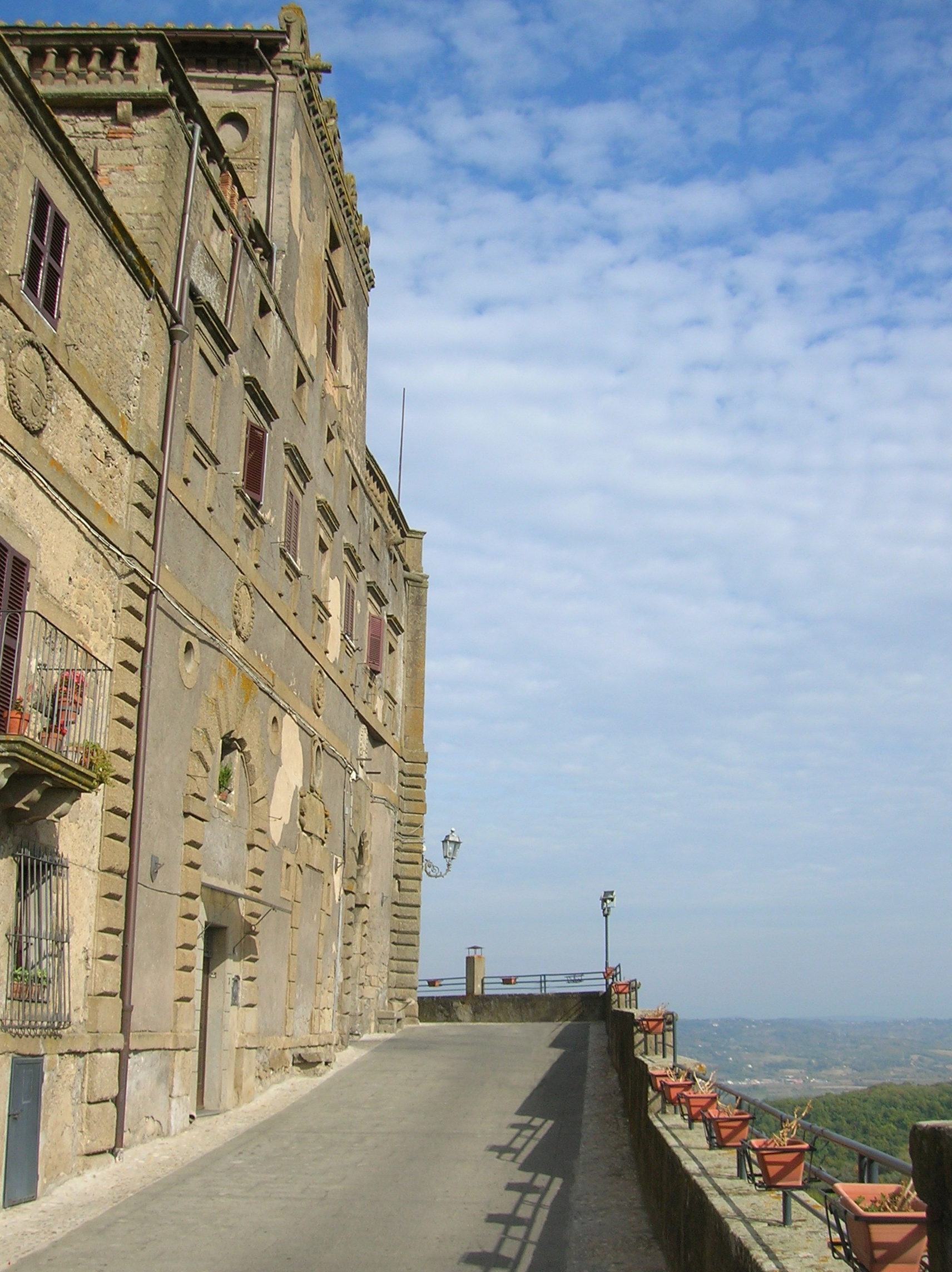
a view of the palace

In 1564 Annibale Caro was commissioned to paint a gigantomachia in the loggia of the palace, but no traces remain of this work, perhaps never realised.

=== The Lante della Rovere ===
In 1645 the nobleman Ippolito Lante della Rovere took over the feud of Bomarzo and with it the palace, because of some debts contracted by the Orsini family. After modifying it with the construction of the hall on the first floor, he had the Allegory of War and Peace painted there between 1660 and 1661, a large fresco by Lorenzo Berrettini, son of Pietro da Cortona.

The works commissioned by the Lante also include the Scaletta or Scala Segreta and the remodelling of the chapel, in whose altar the remains of San Moderato, a local saint who lived in the 17th century, were placed.

=== The Borghese ===
In 1836 the Borghese took over the domain of Bomarzo from the Lante family. They also left the sign of their passage in the palace, having the Saletta frescoed with views of the castles of Mugnano, Chia and Attigliano.

=== The Commune ===
It was only in the second post-war period that the municipality of Bomarzo was able to take possession of the palace, immediately electing it as its seat.

In 2003 it underwent restoration work financed by the Municipality, the Lazio Region, and funds from the European Union.
