= El laberinto (novel) =

1974 novel by Manuel Mujica Lainez

- First edition (Argentina)
- Author: Manuel Mujica Lainez
- Cover artist: El Greco, detail from The Burial of the Count of Orgaz
- Language: Spanish
- Publication date: 1974
- Publication place: Argentina
- Media type: Print (Hardback & Paperback)

El Laberinto (Spanish for "The Labyrinth") is a 1974 novel by the Argentine writer Manuel Mujica Lainez.

El Laberinto tell the story of Ginés de Silva. De Silva is the boy shown holding a torch in the lower left-hand corner of El Greco's 1586 painting The Burial of Count Orgaz.

This picaresque Bildungsroman presents, a rich and highly amusing series of pictures from the boy's Seville childhood in the 1570s to the old man's death in early colonial Argentina in the 1650s. Thus it connects, somehow, its author's Renaissance-preoccupied novels (Bomarzo and The Wandering Unicorn) with which it forms a kind of trilogy, with Mujica Lainez' Buenos Aires cycle.

As usual with Manuel Mujica Lainez, the main love-story in this novel involves a same-sex relationship.
