= Misteriosa Buenos Aires =

Mysterious Buenos Aires
- First edition
- Author: Manuel Mujica Laínez
- Original title: Misteriosa Buenos Aires
- Language: Spanish
- Publication date: 1951
- Publication place: Argentina
- Media type: Print (hardback)

Misteriosa Buenos Aires (Spanish for Mysterious Buenos Aires) is a 1951 collection of short fiction by Manuel Mujica Lainez. It contains 42 short stories, each evoking a historical moment in the history of Buenos Aires, from 1536 to 1904.

Misteriosa Buenos Aires forms part of the author's Buenos Aires cycle. Comprising four novels and two short story collections, from Aquí viverion (1949) to Invitados in El Paraíso (1957), the cycle is centered on Buenos Aires and Argentine history and established Mujica Laínez's reputation.

== Themes ==
In its consideration of civilized life on the site of the city, the collection exemplifies a key theme in Argentine literature, first invoked by Sarmiento: the dualistic struggle between Civilization and Barbarism.

The first story, "El hambre" ("Famine") shows the first European settlers starving behind a flimsy, improvised palisade, as they nervously eye the Indian bonfires in the surrounding darkness. The final tale, "El salón dorado" ("The Gold Drawing-room") has a ruined grande dame of 1904 sitting despairingly in the golden salon of her great mansion, awaiting the auctioneers, "like gray and black animals, like wolves and hyenas around the great bonfire". One need not know that there is precisely such a richly appointed "Salón Dorado" in Buenos Aires' City Hall building to understand that fate has come full circle for the failed Great City, that barbarism has triumphed, that it always does.

Mujica Laínez's cool and urbane tone is slyly deceptive: his manner might be a subtly ironic homage to Octave Feuillet, but his vision is profoundly pessimistic, even chilling, in the classic Spanish desengaño school.
