= Bomarzo =

- Comune
- Comune di Bomarzo
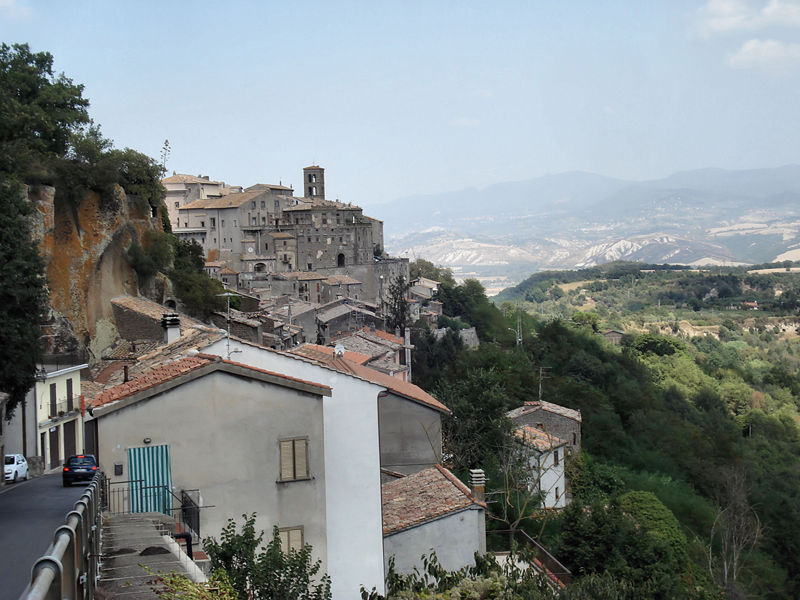

- Coat of arms

- Location within Italy Location within Lazio
- Coordinates: 42°28′N 12°14′E
- Country: Italy
- Region: Lazio
- Province: Viterbo (VT)
- Frazioni: Mugnano in Teverina

Government
  - Mayor: Ivo Cialdea

Area
  - Total: 39.65 km^{2} (15.31 sq mi)
- Elevation: 263 m (863 ft)

Population (30 April 2017)
  - Total: 1,791
  - Density: 45.17/km^{2} (117.0/sq mi)
- Demonym: Bomarzesi
- Time zone: UTC+1 (CET)
  - Summer (DST): UTC+2 (CEST)
- Postal code: 01020
- Dialing code: 0761
- Patron saint: St. Anselm
- Saint day: April 24
- Website: Official website

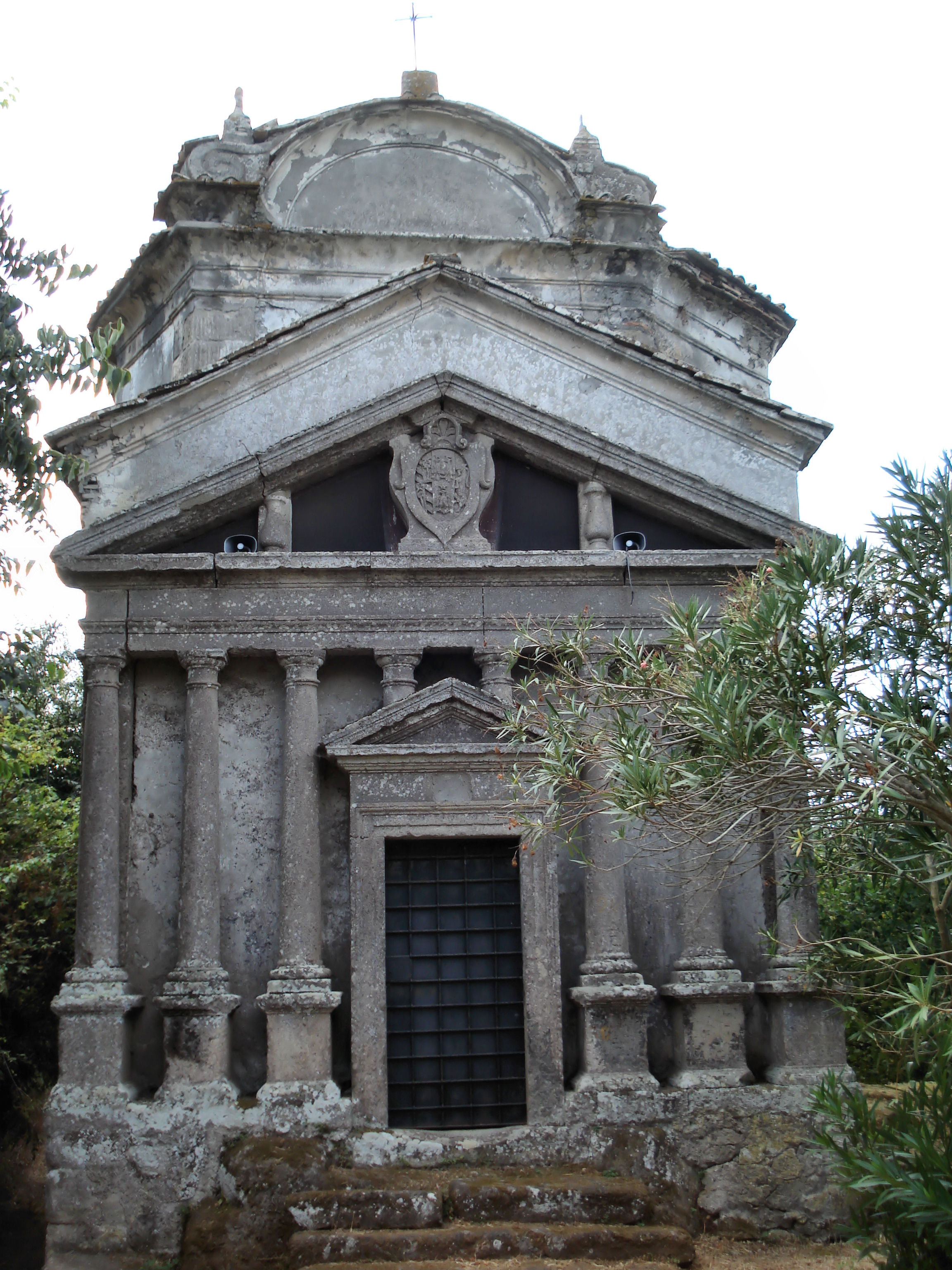
Church of Santa Maria della Valle.

Bomarzo is a town and comune of the province of Viterbo (Lazio, Central Italy), in the lower valley of the Tiber. It is located 14.5 kilometres (9.0 mi) east-northeast of Viterbo and 68 kilometres (42 mi) north-northwest of Rome.

== History ==
The city's current name is a derivation of Polymartium, first mentioned in the Historia Langobardorum by Paulus Diaconus. The etymology "polis martium", city of Mars, suggests a Roman origin. However, archeological evidence for a Roman city has not been found so far. However, a Roman brickmaking factory established nearby may have been owned by Domitia Calvilla, the mother of the Emperor Marcus Aurelius.

It was a historical fiefdom of the Orsini family, whose castle is at the edge of the densely built town, until it was sold to Ippolito Lante Montefeltro della Rovere in 1645. Lante was elevated to the title of Duke of Bomarzo.

== Main sights ==
Bomarzo's main attraction is a garden, usually referred to as the Bosco Sacro (Sacred grove) or, locally, Bosco dei Mostri ("Monsters' Grove"), named after the many larger-than-life sculptures, some sculpted in the bedrock, which populate this predominantly barren landscape.

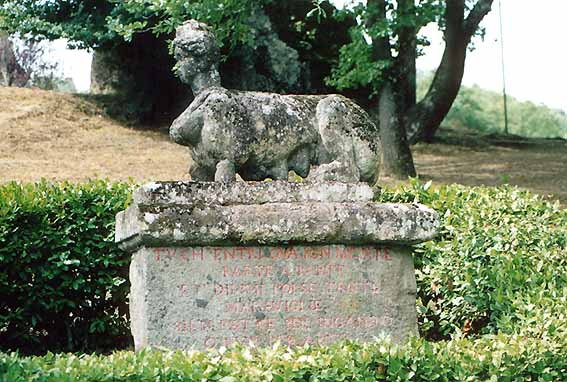
A sphinx at the entrance of the Park of the Monsters.

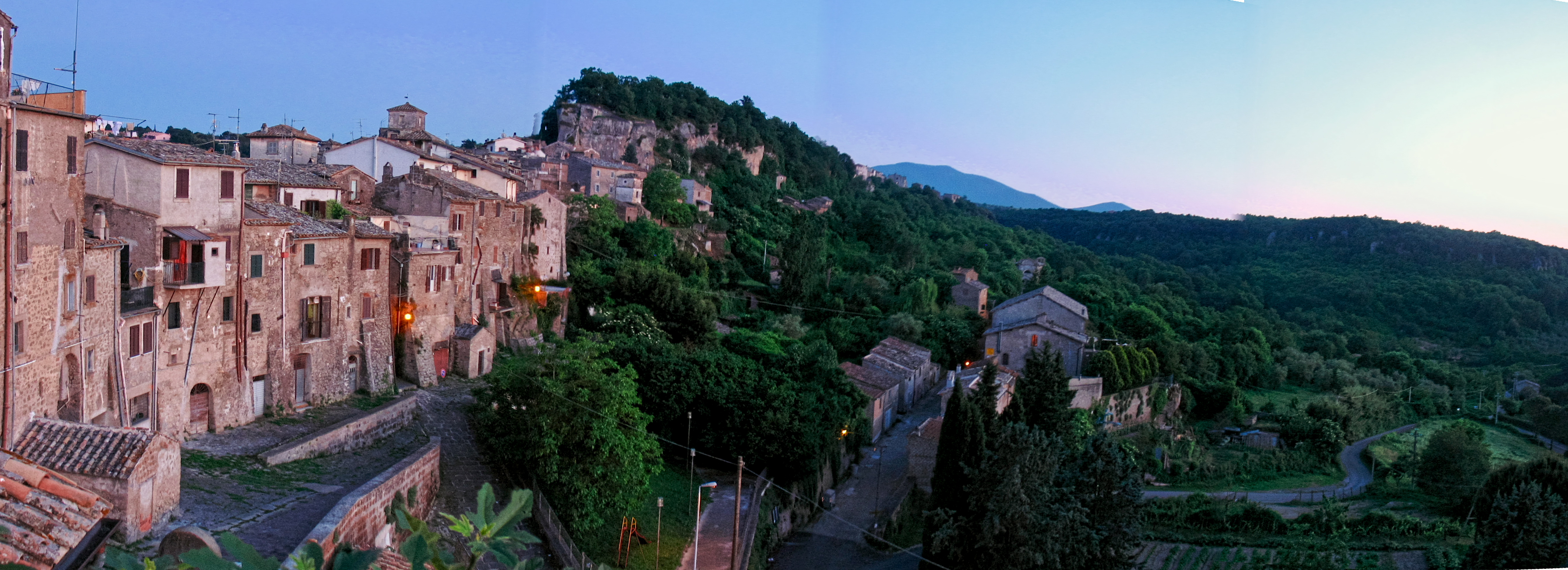
Bomarzo

It is the work of Pier Francesco Orsini, called Vicino (1528–1588), a condottiero or mercenary and a patron of the arts. He was greatly devoted to his wife Giulia Farnese, daughter of Galeazzo Farnese, Duke of Latera, (not to be confused with her maternal great-aunt Giulia Farnese) and when she died, he created the gardens. The design has been attributed to Pirro Ligorio, a well known architect and antiquarian of the time.

The park of Bomarzo was intended not to please, but to astonish, and like many Mannerist works of art, its symbolism is arcane; for example, one large sculpture is of one of Hannibal's war elephants, which mangles a Roman legionary, and another is a statue of Ceres lounging on the bare ground, with a vase of "fruits of the earth" perched on her head.

The many monstrous statues appear to be unconnected to any rational plan and appear to have been strewn almost randomly about the area, sol per sfogare il Core ("just to set the heart free") as one inscription on an obelisk says.

Enigmatic verses in Italian by Annibale Caro, Bitussi and Cristoforo Madruzzo, some of them now eroded, were inscribed onto stone beside the sculptures.

The reason for the layout and design of the garden is largely unknown: perhaps they were meant as a foil to the perfect symmetry and layout of the great Renaissance gardens nearby at Villa Farnese at Caprarola and Villa Lante at Bagnaia. Next to a formal exedra is a tilting building, the so-called Casa Storta or Twisted House.

A small octagonal temple was added about twenty years later to honor Orsini's wife, Giulia Farnese.

During the nineteenth century and well into the twentieth, the garden became overgrown and neglected but in the 1970s a program of restoration was implemented by the Bettini family, and today the garden, which remains private property, is a major tourist attraction. In recent years, a number of the stone sculptures have had fences put around them.

The surreal nature of the Parco dei Mostri appealed to Jean Cocteau and the great surrealist Salvador Dalí, who discussed it at great length. The poet André Pieyre de Mandiargues wrote an essay devoted to Bomarzo. Niki de Saint Phalle was inspired by Bomarzo when she created her Tarot Garden in Tuscany. The story behind Bomarzo and the life of Pier Francesco Orsini are the subject of a novel by the Argentinian writer Manuel Mujica Láinez (1910–1984), Bomarzo (1962). Mujica Láinez himself wrote a libretto based on his novel, which was set to music by Alberto Ginastera (1967). The opera Bomarzo premièred in Washington in 1967 but in Argentina it was banned by the military dictatorship. The Dutch magic-surrealist painter Carel Willink used several of the park's statue groups in his paintings, including The Eternal Cry and Balance of Forces. A mystery novel by Linda Lappin, Signatures in Stone (2013), investigates the symbolism of the Sacred Grove, its relation to the myth of Persephone, and recent theories concerning the designer of the park.

== Sources ==
- Guida al Parco dei Mostri. Vitorchiano: Società Giardino di Bomarzo. 2002.
- Elli Mosayebi, Christian Mueller Inderbitzin "Bomarzo - Beobachtungen anhand einer neuen Karte", Institut für Landschaftsarchitektur, ETH Zürich, 2005, ISBN 3-906441-06-7
- Richtsfeld, Bruno J.: Der "Heilige Wald" von Bomarzo und sein "Höllenmaul". In: Metamorphosen. Arbeiten von Werner Engelmann und ethnographische Objekte im Vergleich. Herausgegeben von Werner Engelmann und Bruno J. Richtsfeld. München 1989, S. 18 - 36.
