= La casa (novel) =

1954 novel by Manuel Mujica Lainez

- Author: Manuel Mujica Lainez
- Language: Spanish
- Genre: Novel
- Publication date: 1954
- Publication place: Argentina
- Media type: Print (Hardback & Paperback)

La casa (Spanish: "The House") is a 1954 novel by Argentine writer Manuel Mujica Lainez.

It tells the story of a family living in a stately Buenos Aires mansion from the heyday of Argentina's oligarchy in the 1880s to some time in the post-1946 period, the era of Peronist populism, seen typically as incarnating the end of History, the crisis of modern civilization.

The House constitutes not only the narrator but the real protagonist: its inhabitants (including two ghosts) and the encircling wolves are perceived as actors within a living structure, a living structure that never ceases to die.

This novel is a key link in Mujica Lainez's Buenos Aires cycle.
