= El gran teatro =

1979 novel by Manuel Mujica Lainez

- First edition (Argentina)
- Author: Manuel Mujica Lainez
- Language: Spanish
- Publication date: 1979
- Publication place: Argentina
- Media type: Print (Hardback & Paperback)

El gran teatro (Spanish: "The Great Theatre" or "The Grand Theatre") is a 1979 novel by Argentine writer Manuel Mujica Lainez, part of his Buenos Aires series.

The whole action of the novel takes place during a performance of Wagner's Parsifal at Buenos Aires' famous opera house, the Teatro Colón.

The Colón is The Great Theatre, a giant jewellery box built, in a different age, for a class of leaders (or show-offs) to show itself off.
