= Pier Francesco Orsini =

Italian condottiero and patron of the arts

Vicino Orsini

Condottiero

Duke of Bomarzo

Patron of the arts

Personal details
- Born: Pier Francesco Orsini; July 4, 1523 Rome, Italy
- Died: January 28, 1583 (aged 59) Lazio, Italy
- Spouse: Giulia Farnese
- Parents: Giovanni Corrado Orsini (father); Clarice Orsini di Franciotto di Monterotondo (mother)
- Occupation: Politician
- Religion: Epicureanism

Military service
- Battles/wars: Treaty of Cateau-Cambrésis

Pier Francesco Orsini (4 July 1523 – 28 January 1583), also called Vicino Orsini, was an Italian condottiero, patron of the arts, and duke of Bomarzo. He is famous as the commissioner of the Mannerist Park of the Monsters in Bomarzo (northern Lazio).

== Biography ==
=== Early years ===
Born in Rome, he was the son of Giovanni Corrado Orsini and Clarice Orsini di Franciotto di Monterotondo.

His maternal grandmother, Violante di Vicino Orsini di Foglia, had been transmitted the rights to the fief of Bormarzo by her father, Pierfrancesco I Orsini, also known as Vicino, who was lord of Bomarzo.

His maternal grandfather, Cardinal Franciotto Orsini, Lord of Monterotondo, was educated in the house of Lorenzo de' Medici, who had married his aunt Clarice Orsini. After the death of his wife, Franciotto was made a cardinal by his uncle Giovanni de' Medici, who had become pope as Leo X.

Vicino Orsini inherited the duchy of Bomarzo seven years after the death of his father, thanks to an intercession in 1542 by Alessandro Farnese (Pope Paul III), after a dispute over inheritance with his younger brother, Maerbale. He spent the majority of 1542 living in Venice and frequenting its intellectual circles, where he met Francesco Sansovino, with whom he became close friends.

=== Marriage ===
He married Alessandro Farnese's great-niece, Giulia Farnese, in the early 1540s. According to Casa Cesarini. Ricerche e documenti by Patrizia Rosini, Vicino Orsini married Giulia Farnese on 11 February 1545 in Rocca di Giove. According to the same book Giulia was named after her great-aunt because her mother Isabella had been raised and protected by her when she lost her mother. This book gives the year of Giulia's death as 1560, while Bomarzo: Ein Garten gegen Gott und die Welt by Renate Vergeiner gives it as 1564. According to Bomarzo: Ein Garten gegen Gott und die Welt, the two married in 1541. The article The Collection of Corradino Orsino by Lothar Sickel places the wedding in January 1541.

Giulia was the daughter of Galeazzo Farnese, Duke of Latera, and Isabella, daughter of Giuliano dell'Anguillara and Girolama Farnese.

Giulia's maternal grandmother, Girolama Farnese, was the sister of Alessandro Farnese (Pope Paul III), and Giulia Farnese, the mistress of Rodrigo Borgia (Pope Alexander VI). Girolama was born in 1466 and was murdered with a sword in Stabiae Castle on 1 November 1504 (or 1505) by her stepson Giovanni Battista dell'Anguillara for alleged infidelity. Her first marriage had been to Puccio Pucci, whom she married on 10 November 1483. Puccio Pucci died in 1494, and she married her second husband, Count Giuliano dell'Anguillara on 15 February 1495. From this marriage came the daughter Isabella (Elisabeth) della Anguillara, who later married Galeazzo Farnese, the grandson of Bartolomeo, and the children of that marriage were the daughters Violante and Giulia Farnese.

One of Giulia's paternal great-grandfathers was Bartolomeo Farnese, Count of Montalto and Canino, and also a brother of Girolama, Alessandro (Pope Paul III) and Giulia Farnese. He was born in 1470 and married Iolanda Monaldeschi, with whom he had the son Pedro Bertodolo Farnese and the daughters Isabella and Cecilia. Bartolomeo died in 1552 and was the founder of the Duchy of Latera, which existed until 1668.

Vicino's wife Giulia Farnese was thus related to Pope Paul III twice over, the only child of his tragically murdered sister, and as the daughter of the grandson of his brother Bartolomeo, the line that inherited the family title and holdings.

In a book published in 1556, Le Imagine del tempio della signora Giovanna Aragona, by Giuseppe Betussi, Giulia Farnese Orsini is referred to as amongst the most virtuous ladies of Italy, on account of her constancy, having remained faithful to Vicino during the long periods when he was absent at war.

=== Military career ===
Vicino's career as a condottiero began in 1545 when he was called upon by Alessandro Farnese (Pope Paul III), to assist with the fortifications of the Borghi of the City of Rome. He was taken prisoner in 1546, while leading Pontifical troops assisting the army of the Holy Roman Emperor, King Charles V, against the Protestant Principates. He was released the following year. He was again taken prisoner and released in 1556, when the Treaty of Cateau-Cambrésis ended the French-Spanish Wars in Italy.

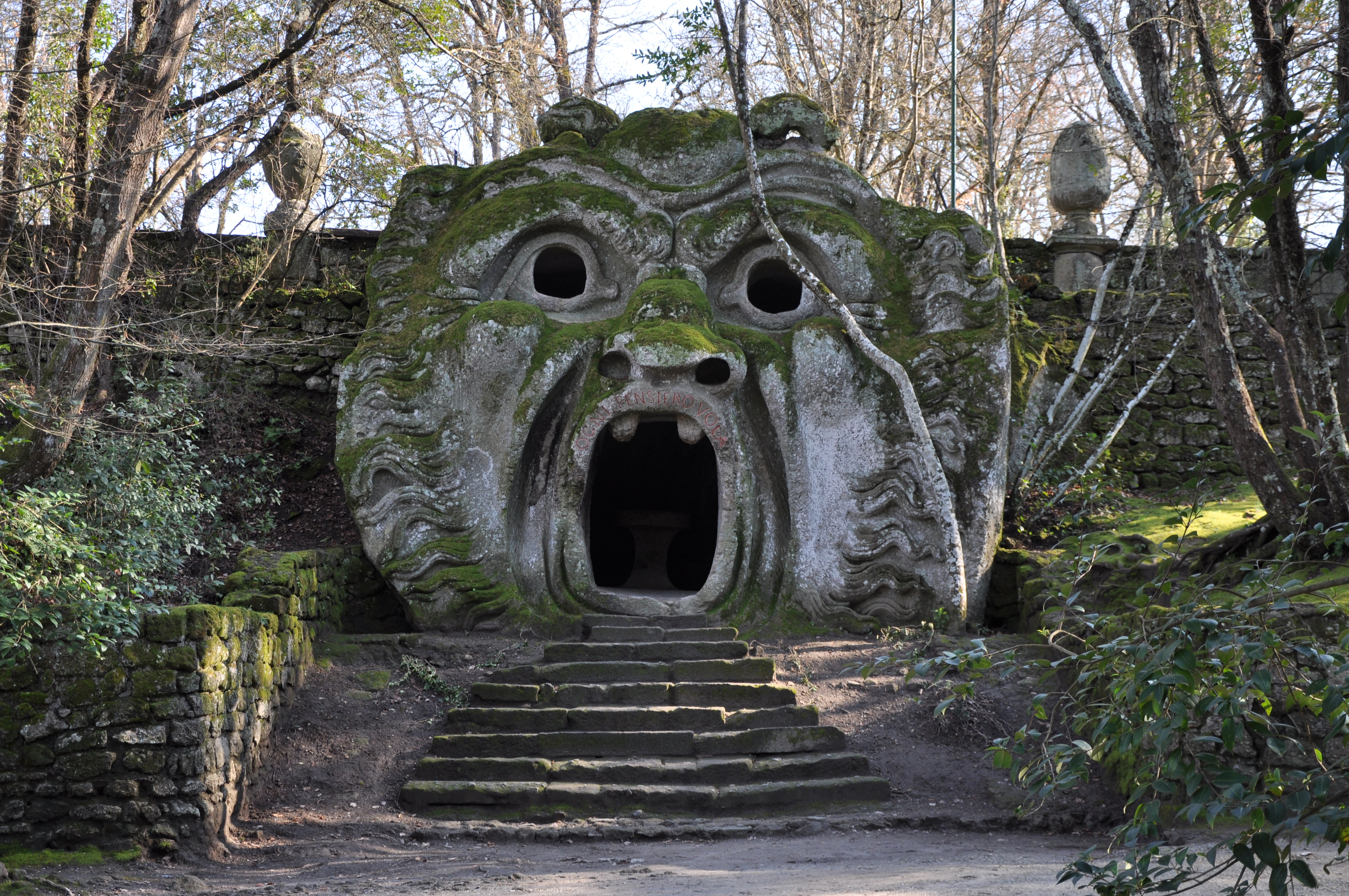
Orcus mouth at the Park of the Monsters.

=== Park of the Monsters ===
Orsini retired to Bomarzo where he surrounded himself with writers and artists, and devoted himself to an Epicurean style of life. Here he had a family and, starting from 1547, created the famous Park of the Monsters (aka 'Sacro Bosco' or 'Garden of Bomarzo'), whose enigmatic constructions and sculptures are one of the most suggestive examples of late Renaissance art in Italy. After the death of his wife he dedicated the park to her memory.

=== Children ===
He and his wife had five sons, Corradino, Marzio, Alessandro, Scipione and Orazio (died in the famous Battle of Lepanto in 1571), and two daughters, Faustina and Ottavia.

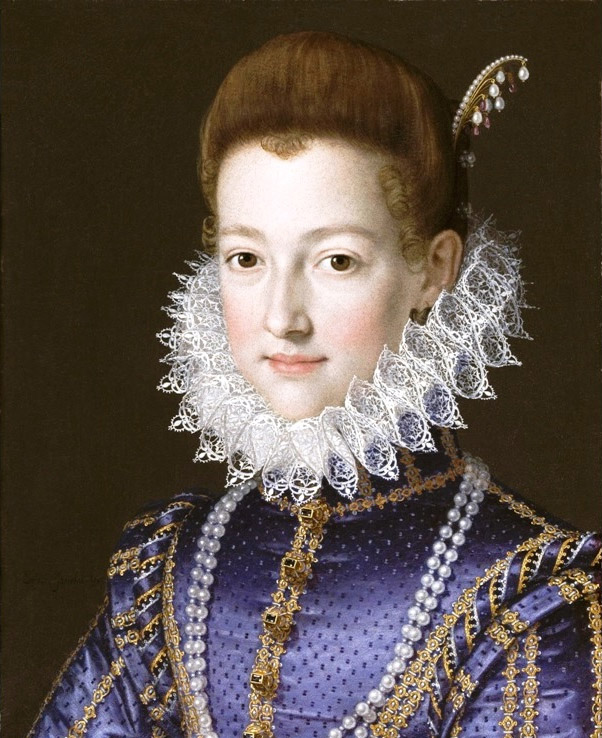
Portrait of Donna Faustina Orsini Mattei (1557-1594) by Scipione Pulzone

Faustina Orsini (1557–1594) married Fabio Mattei. Fabio inherited the Palazzo Nuovo (Palazzo Mattei di Paganica) on his father's death in 1566. He remained close to Cardinal Odoardo Farnese after the marriage. It was with Fabio Mattei that the latter commissioned Annibale Carracci to paint the Pietà installed in the Mattei family chapel in San Francesco a Ripa at Easter 1603 (even though the chapel itself was not completed for a number of years), and Fabio bequeathed some works of art to Odoardo when he died in 1612. He evidently devoted himself to charitable pursuits within the SS Trinità after the death of his wife in 1594. Her portrait was painted by Scipione Pulzone.

Ottavia married Marcantonio Marescotti, III Count of Vignanello, and became Countess of Vignanello. The couple had the children Sforza Vicino Marescotti, IV Count of Vignanello, Ginevra, Clarice alias Santa Giacinta Marescotti and Ortensia.

== Artistic tributes ==
- Alberto Ginastera's 1967 opera Bomarzo is based on the life of Orsini, as told in the book of the same name by Argentinian writer Manuel Mujica Láinez.
- Anna von Hausswolff's song Dolore di Orsini was inspired by Pier Orsini's grief after losing his wife, which led him to create the garden Sacro Bosco.

== Bibliography ==
- Bredekamp, Horst; Janzer, Wolfram (1989). Vicino Orsini e il Sacro Bosco di Bomarzo. Un principe artista ed anarchico. Rome: Edizioni dell'Elefante.
- Mingarro, Miguel (2005). Los jardines del sueño: Polifilo y la mística del Renacimiento (in Spanish). Siruela. p. 488. ISBN 9788478449095.
