= Richard Torigi =

American opera singer (1917–2010)

Richard Torigi

Richard Torigi (October 30, 1917 – April 6, 2010) was an American baritone and voice teacher. He had an active singing career in operas, concerts, and musicals from the 1940s through the 1980s. While still performing, he embarked on a second successful career as a voice teacher which led to teaching positions at a variety of institutions, including the Juilliard School, the Eastman School of Music, and the Academy of Vocal Arts.

== Life and career ==
Born with the name Santo Tortorigi in Brooklyn, Torigi was the son of Italian immigrants to the United States. He studied singing in New York with Eleanor McClellan who was also the teacher of Eileen Farrell. In 1942 he made his Broadway debut as a member of the ensemble in the revival of The Merry Widow, and was heard later that year in the revival of The New Moon. In 1947 he made his professional opera debut with the Rochester Opera as Escamillo in Georges Bizet's Carmen. He then toured the United States with the San Carlo Opera Company in the late 1940s and in 1950 singing the role of Marcello in Giacomo Puccini's La bohème. In the Spring of 1951 he performed the role of Figaro in The Barber of Seville in Los Angeles and with both the Cincinnati Zoo Opera and the St. Louis Municipal Opera.

In 1951 Torigi made his debut with the New York City Opera (NYCO) as Silvio in Pagliacci. He performed regularly at the NYCO for the next 18 years; notably singing in the company premieres of Gian Carlo Menotti's The Consul (1952, John Sorel) and Gaetano Donizetti's Don Pasquale (1955, Malatesta). Other roles Torigi sang at the NYCO included Marcello, Sharpless in Madama Butterfly, and Germont in La traviata among others. His final performance with the company was as Silvio de Narni in Alberto Ginastera's Bomarzo in October 1969 (which had been recorded in 1967). He had previously created that role in the world premiere of Bomarzo at the Washington National Opera in 1967.

Torigi was also active on Broadway and with several other American opera companies during the 1950s and 1960s. In 1955 he made his debut at the Lyric Opera of Chicago as Schaunard in La bohème. In 1956 he was an alternate for Robert Weede as Tony in the original Broadway production of Frank Loesser's The Most Happy Fella. He later portrayed the role of Tony in the show's first National Tour.

After retiring from performance, Torigi worked as a vocal coach and voice teacher. He held teaching posts at a variety of institutions, including Juilliard, Eastman, and the AVA. One of his students was musician and voice actor Barry Carl. He retired from teaching in 2003. He died in Sebastopol, California in 2010 at the age of 92.
