= Linda Lappin =

American poet

- Born: 1953 (age 72–73); Tennessee, U.S.
- Education: Iowa Writers' Workshop (MFA)
- Occupations: Poet and Author

Linda Lappin (born 1953) is an American-born poet, novelist, and translator living in Rome, Italy.

== Biography ==
Lappin was born in Tennessee in 1953. She received a MFA from the University of Iowa Writers Workshop in 1978. During her years at Iowa, she specialized in poetry with Florida poet Donald Justice. Her first volume of poetry, Wintering with the Abominable Snowman, was published in 1976 by the avant-garde press, 'kayak,' run by George Hitchcock in Santa Cruz, California.

She received a Fulbright grant in 1978 to participate in a two-year Fulbright seminar in literary translation held in Rome at the Centro Studi Americani, under the directorship of Frank MacShane of Columbia University and William Weaver, the noted translator of Italian literature. The project pursued by Lappin in those years, a translation from Italian of Carmelo Samonà's novel, Brothers, won two prizes in literary translation in the United States: The Renato Poggioli Award in Translation from Italian given by the New York PEN club and a National Endowment for the Arts (NEA) grant in translation in 1987. She was awarded a second translation grant from the NEA in 1996 for her work on Tuscan writer Federigo Tozzi. From 1987 to the year 2000, she published essays, poems, reviews, and short stories in many US and European publications, including several essays on women writers and artists of the 1920s, including Missing Person in Montparnasse, in the Literary Review, about the life of Jeanne Hébuterne, "Jane Heap and her Circle" in Prairie Schooner, dealing with the lives of Jane Heap and Margaret Anderson, founders of the Little Review and "Dada Queen in the Bad Boys' Club, Baroness Elsa Von Freitag Loringhoven" in Southwest Review.

Major themes in Lappin's work include women's biographies and autobiographies, expatriate writers in the 1920s, and displacement.

== Novels ==
In The Etruscan, her first novel, Harriet Sackett, a feminist photographer, travels to Italy to photograph Etruscan tombs for the Theosophical Society. Here she falls in love with a charismatic count, the occultist and amateur archaeologist, Federigo del Re, who materializes and disappears into the Etruscan landscape. As Harriet stalks her phantasm-lover, the solution to the mystery which propels the novel retreats. Is Federigo Del Re faithful; is he a real count, or even a real man; a fantasy or an Etruscan ghost? The novel draws inspiration from the literary gothic novel, Jungian archetypes, fairy tales, and from DH Lawrence's Sketches of Etruscan Places. Critically, The Etruscan has been analyzed as a recapitulation of the entire tradition of English/American fiction set in Italy. A documentary about the book entitled A Tale of Tuscia, directed by Sergio Baldassarre, is available.

Lappin's second novel, Katherine's Wish, is a meta-fictional re-elaboration of textual documentation pertaining to the final phase of Katherine Mansfield's life. Written from three points of view, that of Katherine Mansfield, of her companion, Ida Baker, and of her husband, John Middleton Murry, Katherine's Wish recreates a slice of Mansfield's life from 1918 until her retreat to Fontainebleau, to Gurdjieff's Institute for the Harmonious Development of Man in 1922, where she died in 1923. The novel focuses on Mansfield's triangular relationship with Ida Baker and Middleton Murry while tracing her artistic and spiritual quest.

Lappin's third novel Signatures in Stone, published by Caravel Books in 2013, is set in the Monster Park of Bomarzo, and draws inspiration from the early twentieth century British writer, Mary Butts.

Lappin's fourth novel is the critically acclaimed Loving Modigliani: The Afterlife of Jeanne Hébuterne (Serving House Books, 2020).

== Sources ==
- Lappin, Linda Wintering with the Abominable Snowman, Santa Cruz: kayak, 1976
- Lappin, Linda The Etruscan, Galway: Wynkin deWorde, 2004
- Lappin, Linda Katherine’s Wish, La Grande, OR: Wordcraft of Oregon, 2008
- Lappin, Linda The Ghosts of Fontainebleau, Southwest Review, Vol. 87, n.1, 2002
- Aakhus, Pat "The Etruscan," The Southern Indiana Review, Vol. XII, n.2, Fall, 2005
- Prampolini, Gaetano "Metafiction in the Italianate Novel," The South Carolina Review, Vol. 40, n.1 Fall, 2007
- Prampolini, Gaetano, "The Etruscan di Linda Lappin," Oltre il Racconto (ed. Canfield), Venice: Mazzanti, 2008
- Serving House Books, servinghousebooks.com, 2020
- Sims Sandy, "Interview with Linda Lappin, The Writer's Chronicle, AWP, March/April 2010, Vo. 42, n.5.
