= The Wandering Unicorn =

1965 fantasy novel written by Manuel Mujica Lainez

- First edition cover art Il fantastico uinicorno (1545) by Walter Hermann Ryff
- Author: Manuel Mujica Lainez
- Original title: El unicornio
- Translator: Mary Fitton
- Language: Spanish
- Genre: Fantasy
- Publisher: Editorial Sudamericana (Spanish), Berkley Books (English)
- Publication date: 1965
- Publication place: Argentina
- English publication date: 1985

El unicornio (known in English as The Wandering Unicorn) is a 1965 fantasy novel by the Argentine author Manuel Mujica Lainez based on the legend of Melusine. Set in medieval France and Palestine of the Crusades, Mujica Lainez’s novel is a mixture of fantasy and romance which is narrated from the perspective of the shapeshifting Melusine.

== Background ==
The events of the original legend of the medieval Romance are recollected early in the novel. Melusine, a fairy, marries Raimondin of Lusignan. However, when he spies her transformed as half-serpent, she flies away with frightful screams. Associated through marriage with the Lusignan family, Melusine appears over the centuries on the towers of their castle, wailing mournfully whenever a disaster or death in the family is imminent.

== Plot ==
Melusine embarks upon an adventure and unrequited love affair with Aiol, the son of Ozil, a crusader knight who bequeaths a unicorn's lance to his son. Together the young knight Aiol and Melusine travel across Europe encountering monsters, angels and Knights Templar, before eventually arriving in war-torn Jerusalem of the Crusades era.

Mujica Lainez’s novel generates empathy towards Melusine as she recollects her adventures, before the love affair between a mortal and an immortal concludes in a tragic ending.

== Editions ==
The Wandering Unicorn (1965) translated by Mary Fitton, with an introduction by Jorge Luis Borges, Berkley Books, 1985

== Awards and nominations ==
- World Fantasy Award—Novel (Finalist, 1984)
- Mythopoeic Fantasy Award (Finalist, 1986)

== See also ==
- Middle Ages Myths/ Melusina
