= Bomarzo (opera) =

- Opera by Alberto Ginastera
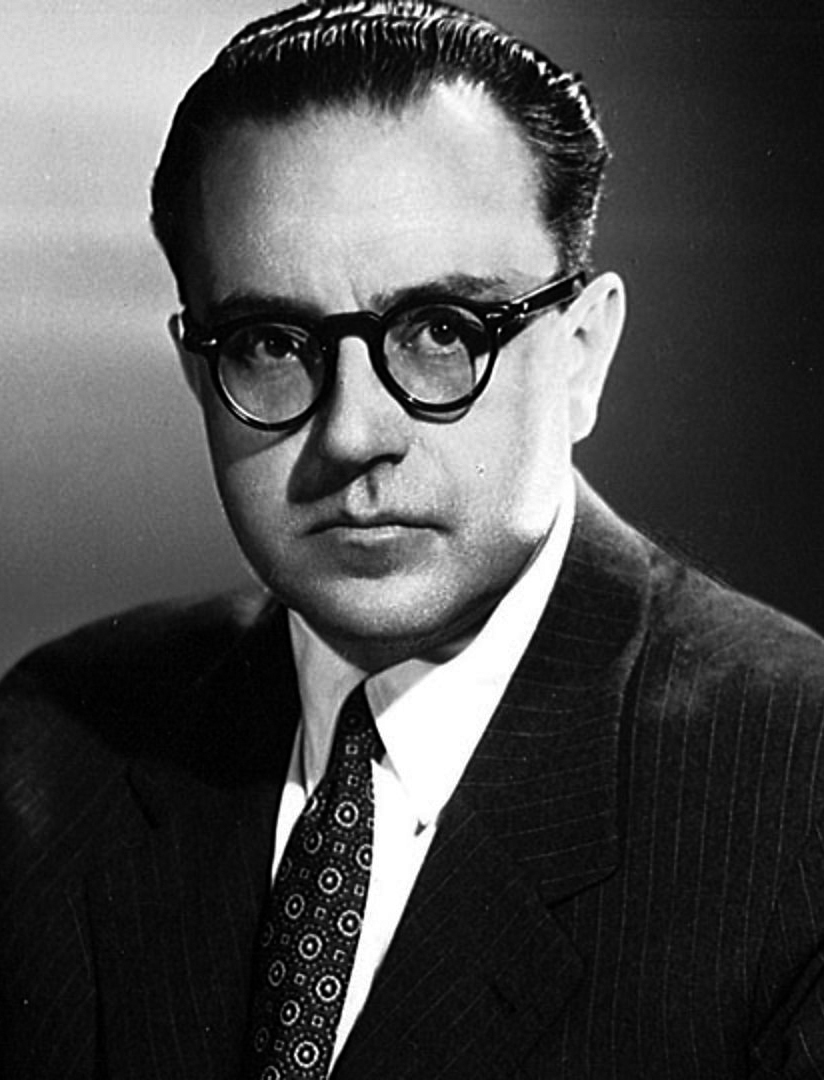
- Ginastera circa 1960
- Librettist: Manuel Mujica Laínez
- Language: Spanish
- Based on: Novel by Manuel Mujica Laínez
- Premiere: 19 May 1967; Opera Society of Washington

Bomarzo is an opera in two acts by the Argentinian composer Alberto Ginastera, his Opus 34. He set a Spanish libretto by Manuel Mujica Laínez, based on his 1962 novel about the 16th-century Italian eccentric Pier Francesco Orsini.

The opera makes use of twelve-tone techniques, quarter tones – primarily in the harp parts – and controlled stochastic textures of non-synchronous repetitions of motifs and cells. Published by Boosey & Hawkes, New York, the work's two acts encompass a prelude and 15 scenes. Pola Suarez Urtubey has published an analysis of the opera with an outline of the dramatic structure.

== Productions ==
The opera had its world premiere at the Opera Society of Washington, Washington D.C., on 19 May 1967. The same production was first given at New York City Opera on 14 March 1968. The work had been scheduled for its first performance in Argentina on 4 August 1967 at the Teatro Colón, but the Argentine de facto president, Juan Carlos Onganía, had banned the production, objecting to the sexual content of the story. The first performance in Argentina did not occur until 1972, with the composer in attendance.

The first UK production was by the English National Opera on 3 November 1976, in an English translation by Lionel Salter.

The first production in Spain was at the Teatro Real, Madrid, on 24 April 2017 with John Daszak in the title role. This staging was planned as a joint production by Pierre Audi with the Dutch National Opera, but was never performed in Amsterdam.

== Roles ==
- Pier Francesco Orsini, Duke of Bomarzo (tenor)
- Girolamo, elder brother of Pier Francesco (baritone)
- Maerbale, younger brother of Pier Francesco (baritone)
- Bomarzo's father (bass)
- Diana Orsini, Bomarzo's grandmother (contralto)
- Pantasilea, courtesan of Florence (mezzo-soprano)
- Julia Farnese, the Duke's wife (soprano)
- Silvio de Narni, alchemist to the Duke (baritone)
- Abul, slave to Bomarzo (silent role)
- Nicolás, nephew to Bomarzo (tenor or alto)
- A messenger (baritone)
- A shepherd (boy soprano)
- Pier Francesco, Girolamo and Maerbale as children (child speakers)
- A skeleton (dancer)

== Synopsis ==
Pier Francesco Orsini, the Duke of Bomarzo, a stunted hunchback, drinks what his astrologer Silvio de Narni claims to be a magic potion that will grant the Duke immortality. However, the drink turns out to be poisoned. After the poison starts to work, Bomarzo begins to recall his life in a series of flashbacks.

His father drags the young Pier Francesco into a room where a large skeleton dances and haunts him. Later, his father falls in battle. In Florence, the young, virginal Pier Francesco goes to see to the courtesan Pantasilea. However, he sees his image in her room of mirrors, to his disturbance.

Pier Francesco's brother Girolamo falls from a cliff and dies, and Pier Francesco becomes the new Duke of Bomarzo. He meets Julia Farnese, who prefers Bomarzo's brother Maerbale, to his anger. At a dance festival, the Duke experiences various dreams. While courting Julia, he spills a glass of red wine on her dress, which he interprets as a premonition of death.

Bomarzo and Julia eventually marry, but Bomarzo then becomes impotent. As time passes, the Duke creates large stone sculptures on his estate, symbolic of his tortured feelings. He starts to think that Julia is betraying him with Maerbale. The Duke orders his slave Abul to kill his brother.

The astrologer Silvio mixes the magic potion as Bomarzo's nephew Nicolás watches. Nicolás then poisons the drink. After he drinks the potion, the Duke dies.

== Recording ==
- CBS 32 310006: Salvador Novoa, Isabel Penagos, Joanna Simon, Claramae Turner, Brent Ellis, Richard Torigi, Michael Devlin; Joaquin Romaguera; Chorus and Orchestra of the Washington Opera Society; Julius Rudel, conductor, 1967
