= Bomarzo (novel) =

1962 novel by Manuel Mujica Lainez

- First edition
- Author: Manuel Mujica Lainez
- Cover artist: Lorenzo Lotto - Portrait of a Gentleman in his Study
- Language: Spanish
- Publication date: 1962
- Publication place: Argentina
- Media type: Print (Hardback & Paperback)

Bomarzo is a novel by the Argentine writer Manuel Mujica Lainez, written in 1962 and later adapted by its author to an opera libretto set by Alberto Ginastera, which had its premiere in Washington, D.C., in 1967.

It is set in the eerie and surreal Italian Renaissance town and palace of Bomarzo and concerns the morally and physically deformed Pier Francesco Orsini, Duke of Bomarzo.
