= Manuel Mujica Lainez =

Argentine novelist, essayist and art critic

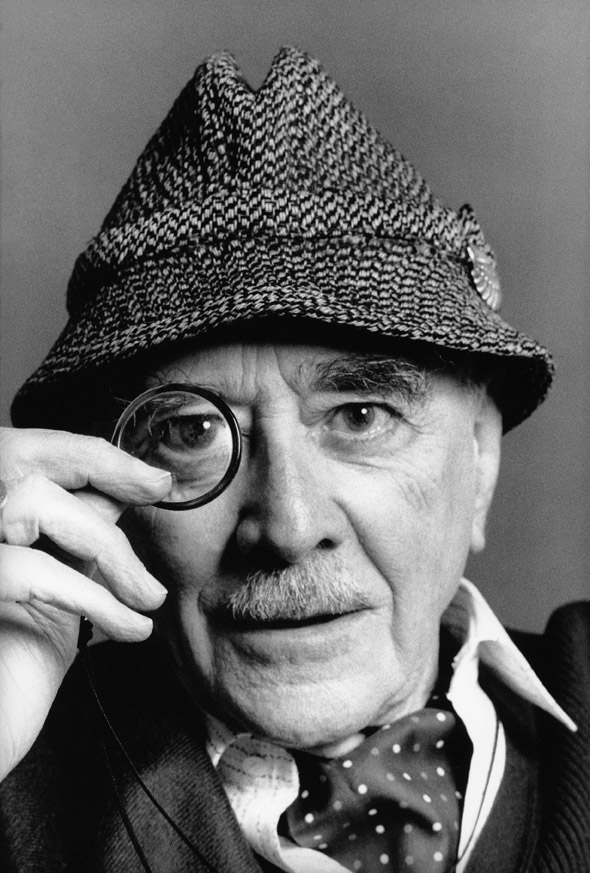
- Mujica Lainez in 1974 (photography by Sara Facio)
- Born: Manuel Bernabé Mujica Lainez; 11 September 1910; Buenos Aires, Argentina
- Died: 21 April 1984 (aged 73); La Cumbre, Córdoba, Argentina
- Occupation: Writer
- Spouse: Ana de Alvear Ortiz Basualdo
- Children: 3
- Writing career
- Genres: Fantasy, Historical fiction
- Notable awards: Legion of Honor (1982)

Manuel Mujica Lainez (11 September 1910 – 21 April 1984) was an Argentine novelist, essayist, translator and art critic.

He is mainly known for his cycle of historical novels called "La saga porteña" (The Buenos Aires Saga), consisting of Los ídolos (1953), La casa (1954), Los viajeros (1955) and Invitados en El Paraíso (1957); as well as his cycle of historical fantasy novels consisting of Bomarzo (1962), El unicornio (1965) and El laberinto (1974). He is also known for his first two short story collections Aquí vivieron (1949) and Misteriosa Buenos Aires (1950).

== Life ==
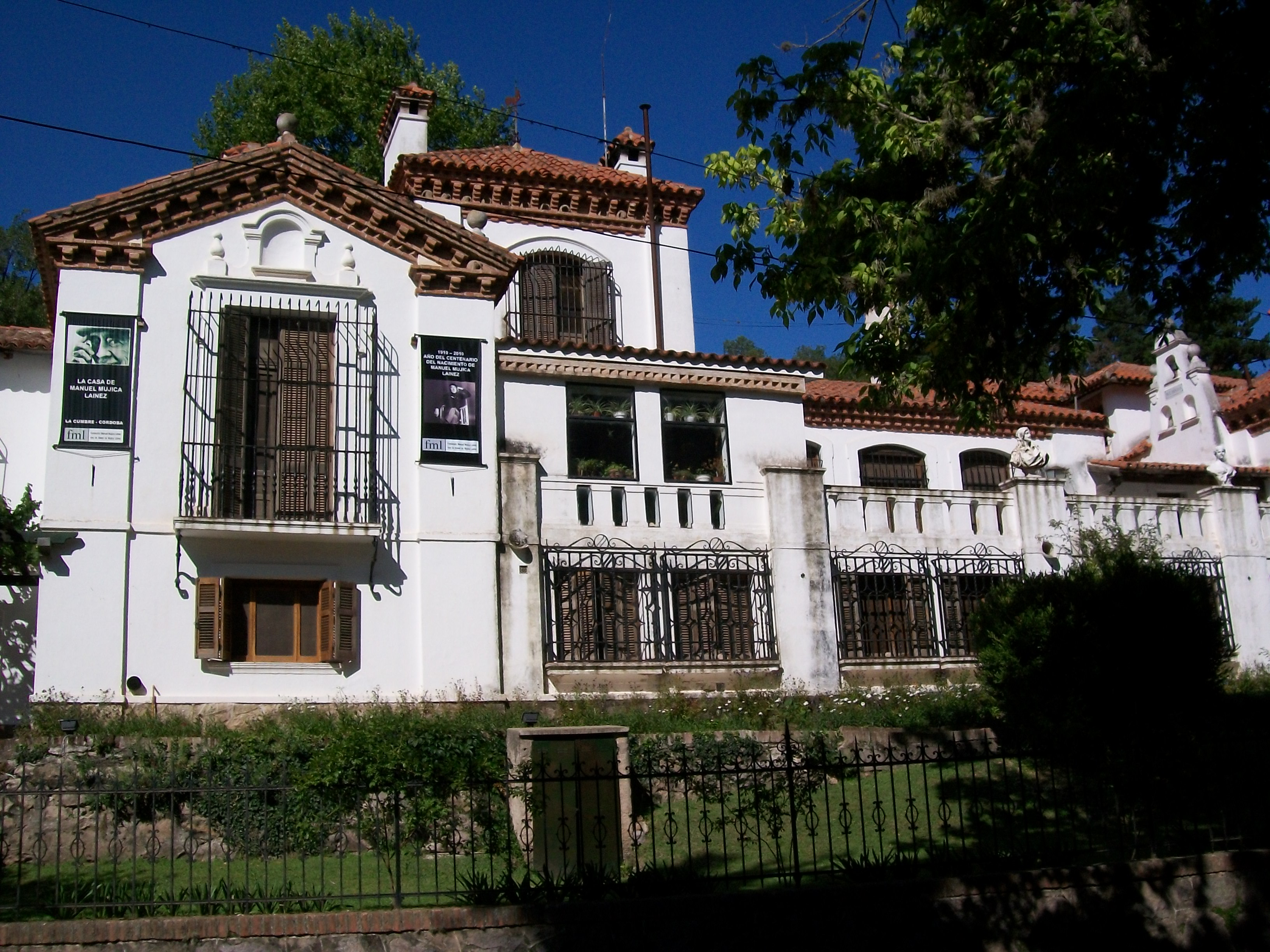
El Paraíso, his villa in Córdoba (architect: León Dourge)

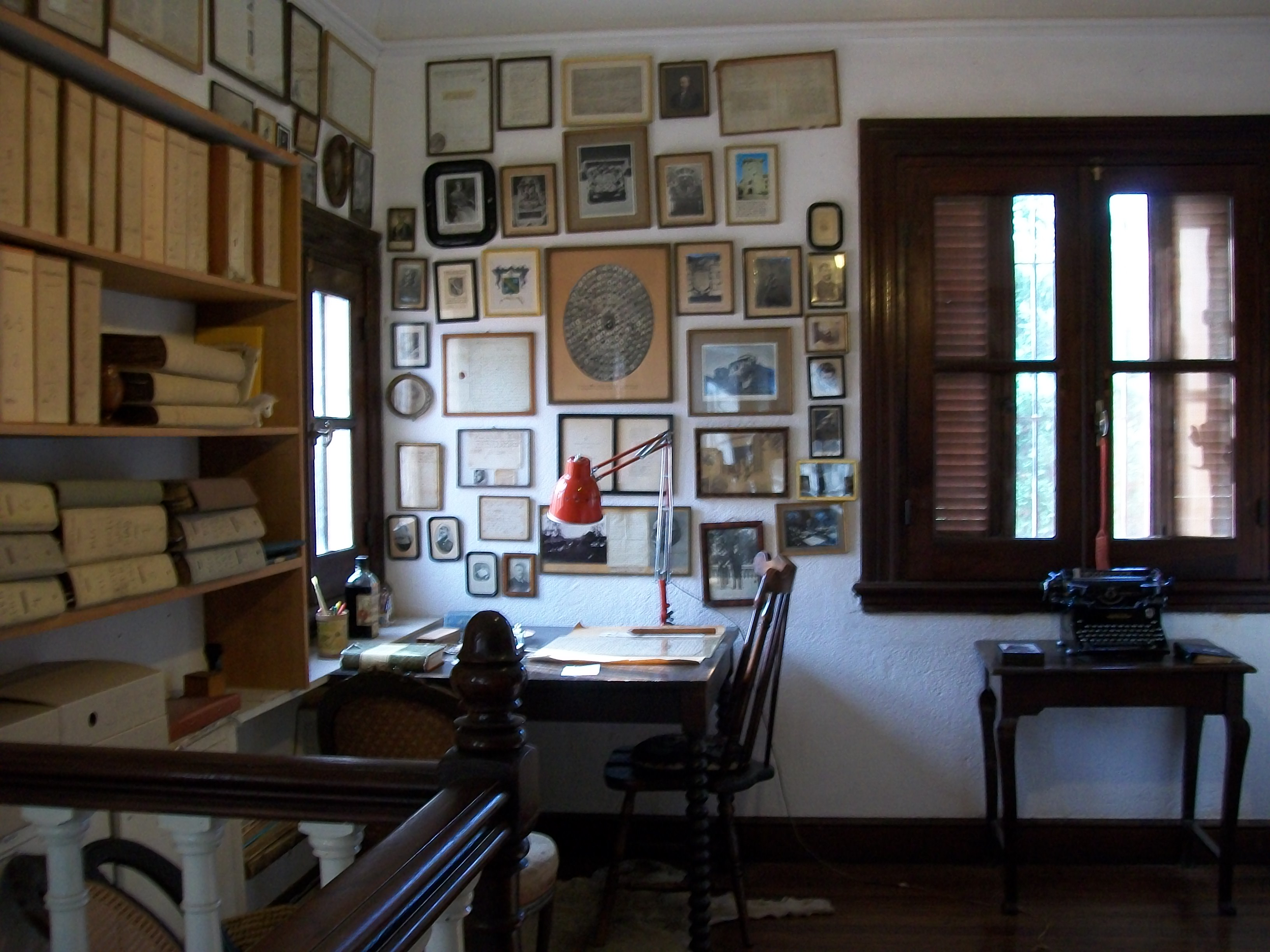
His study at El Paraíso

His parents belonged to old and aristocratic families, being descended from the founder of the city, Juan de Garay, as well as from notable men of letters of 19th century Argentina, such as Florencio Varela and Miguel Cané. As was traditional at the time, the family spent protracted periods in Paris and London so that Manuel, known proverbially and famously as "Manucho", could become proficient in French and English. He completed his formal education at the Colegio Nacional de San Isidro, later dropping out of law school.

In spite of their proud ancestry, the Mujica Lainez family was not notably well-off by this time, and he went to work at Buenos Aires' newspaper La Nación as literary and art critic. This permitted him to marry in 1936, his bride being a beautiful patrician girl, Ana de Alvear, descended from Carlos María de Alvear. They had two sons (Diego and Manuel) and a daughter (Ana). 1936 was also the year of the 25-year-old's first publication, Glosas castellanas.

Mujica Lainez was a member of the Argentine Academy of Letters and the Academy of Fine Arts. In 1982 he received the French's Legion of Honor. He died at his Villa "El Paraíso" (The Paradise) in Cruz Chica, Córdoba Province, in 1984.

== Career ==
Mujica Lainez was preeminently a narrator and enumerator of Buenos Aires, from its earliest colonial times to the present, taking inspiration from high society. He also worked as a translator, he translated Shakespeare's Sonnets and works by Racine, Molière, Marivaux, and others.

Throughout his career he received certain honors and awards, including Ordre des Arts et des Lettres (1964), the distinction of Commander of Order of Merit of the Italian Republic (1967) given by the Italian government and the Legion of Honour by the French government (1982). In 1964 he received the John F. Kennedy Prize for his novel Bomarzo, shared with fellow Argentine writer Julio Cortázar for his novel Hopscotch (1963).

== Works ==
=== Novels ===
- Don Galaz de Buenos Aires (1938)
- The porteño saga:
  - Los ídolos (1952)
  - La casa (1954)
  - Los viajeros (1955)
  - Invitados en "El Paraíso" (1957)
- Bomarzo (1962)
- El unicornio (1965) translated as The Wandering Unicorn
- De milagros y de melancolías (1969)
- Cecil (1972)
- El laberinto (1974)
- El viaje de los siete demonios (1974)
- Sergio (1976)
- Los cisnes (1977)
- El gran teatro (1979)
- El brazalete (1981)
- El escarabajo (1982)

=== Short story collections ===
- La galera (1936)
- Aquí vivieron (1949)
- Misteriosa Buenos Aires (1950)
- Crónicas reales (1967)
- El brazalete y otros cuentos (1978)
- Cuentos inéditos (posthumous, 1993)

=== Essays ===
- Glosas Castellanas (1936)
- Héctor Basaldúa (1956)

=== Biographies ===
- Miguel Cané (padre) (1942)
- Vida de Aniceto el gallo (1943)
- Vida de Anastasio el pollo (1947)

=== Translations ===
- Cuarenta y nueve sonetos de Shakespeare (1962)
- Las mujeres sabias by Moliére (1964)
- Las falsas confidencias by Pierre de Marivaux (1967)
- Fedra by Jean Racine (1972)

=== Collaborations ===
- Canto a Buenos Aires (1943)
- Estampas de Buenos Aires (1946)

=== Opera ===
- Mujica Lainez adapted his novel Bomarzo for the operatic stage, writing the libretto set to music by Alberto Ginastera and premièred in 1967. This opera was banned by the Argentine military dictatorship in those days.
