= Deaths in September 2014 =

The following is a list of notable deaths in September 2014.

Entries for each day are listed alphabetically by surname. A typical entry lists information in the following sequence:

- Name, age, country of citizenship and reason for notability, established cause of death, reference.

== September 2014 ==
=== 1 ===
- David Anderle, 77, American record producer (The Doors), cancer.
- Liaqat Ali Bangulzai, Pakistani politician and columnist.
- Bernard Baran, 49, American teacher's aide, wrongfully convicted of indecent assault.
- Ralf Bendix, 90, German Schlager singer, music producer, composer and songwriter.
- Frank Calloway, 99, American artist and longevity claimant.
- Mary T. Clark, 100, American religious sister, academic, and civil rights advocate.
- Dillard Crocker, 89, American basketball player.
- Mark Gil, 52, Filipino actor, cirrhosis.
- Ahmed Abdi Godane, 37, Somali militant, Emir of al-Shabaab (2009–2010, since 2011), airstrike.
- Arturo Hammersley, 92, Chilean Olympic skier.
- Donnie Humphrey, 53, American football player (Green Bay Packers).
- Jimi Jamison, 63, American musician (Survivor), hemorrhagic brain stroke.
- Jim Jennings, 73, American college basketball player (Murray State Racers).
- Gottfried John, 72, German actor (Berlin Alexanderplatz, GoldenEye, Proof of Life), cancer.
- Mzee Kaukungwa, 94, Namibian politician.
- Mile Kos, 89, Serbian football player and coach and sportswriter.
- A. J. Langguth, 81, American historian and journalist.
- Roger McKee, 87, American baseball player (Philadelphia Phillies).
- Charley Powell, 82, American football player (San Francisco 49ers, Oakland Raiders) and boxer.
- Maya Rao, 86, Indian Kathak dancer, cardiac arrest.
- Sergio Rodrigues, 86, Brazilian architect and designer.
- Hugh McGregor Ross, 97, English computer scientist and theologian.
- Joseph Shivers, 93, American textile chemist, developed spandex.
- Bala Tampoe, 92, Sri Lankan lawyer and trade unionist, General Secretary of the Ceylon Mercantile Union.
- Elena Varzi, 87, Italian actress (Path of Hope), cardiac arrest.
- Yoon Jung-chun, 41, South Korean football player and coach.

=== 2 ===
- Thierry Bianquis, 78-79, French orientalist and arabist.
- Cao Keming, 81, Chinese politician.
- Bob Cain, 80, American radio and television journalist.
- Jack Culpin, 86, Australian politician, member of the Victorian Legislative Assembly for Glenroy (1976–1985) and Broadmeadows (1985–1988).
- F. Emmett Fitzpatrick, 84, American attorney and politician, District Attorney of Philadelphia (1974–1978), Alzheimer's disease.
- Cayo Sila Godoy, 94, Paraguayan classical guitarist.
- Norman Gordon, 103, South African Test cricketer.
- William D. Gourley, 77, American football coach and sportscaster.
- J. LaMoine Jenson, 79, American religious leader, President of the Priesthood of the Apostolic United Brethren (since 1977), colon cancer.
- Jiang Zhonghua, Chinese Navy rear admiral, suicide by jumping.
- Patrick Lung, 80, Hong Kong film director.
- Dino Menardi, 91, Italian Olympic ice hockey player.
- William "Bill" Ralph Merton, 96, British military scientist and financier.
- Helena Rakoczy, 92, Polish gymnast, Olympic bronze medalist (1956) and world champion (1950).
- Paul W. Robertson, 59, Canadian television executive, cancer.
- Sándor Rozsnyói, 83, Hungarian steeplechase runner, Olympic silver medalist (1956) and European champion (1954).
- Steven Sotloff, 31, American journalist (Time), beheading. (death announced on this date)
- Su Nan-cheng, 78, Taiwanese politician.
- Graham Theakston, 62, British television director (The Politician's Wife), cancer.
- Goolam Essaji Vahanvati, 65, Indian lawyer, Attorney General (2009–2014), heart attack.
- Antonis Vardis, 66, Greek composer and singer, cancer.
- A. P. Venkateswaran, 84, Indian diplomat, Foreign Secretary (1986–1987).
- James White, 76, Irish politician and hotelier.

=== 3 ===
- Abu Al-Izz Al-Hariri, 68, Egyptian politician.
- Dorothy Braxton, 87, New Zealand journalist.
- Marina von Ditmar, 99, German film actress.
- Thawan Duchanee, 74, Thai painter, architect and sculptor, liver failure.
- Quintin Goosen, 67, Zimbabwean cricketer and umpire.
- Roy Heather, 79, English television actor (Only Fools and Horses).
- Andrew Madoff, 48, American financier, mantle cell lymphoma.
- Mark Otway, 82, New Zealand tennis player. (death announced on this date)
- Aarno Raninen, 70, Finnish actor, composer and musician, house fire.
- Andy Stapp, 70, American political activist, founded the American Servicemen's Union.
- Zeus, 5, American Great Dane, world's tallest dog, natural causes.

=== 4 ===
- Martynas Andriukaitis, 33, Lithuanian basketball player, suicide by gunshot.
- Donatas Banionis, 90, Lithuanian Soviet actor (Solaris), stroke.
- Terry W. Brown, 64, American politician, cancer.
- Giuseppe Carattino, 95, Italian Olympic sailor.
- Riva Castleman, 84, American art historian.
- Clare Cathcart, 48, British actress (Call the Midwife, Doctors), asthma attack.
- Gustavo Cerati, 55, Argentine singer and musician (Soda Stereo), respiratory arrest.
- René Radembino Coniquet, 81, Gabonese politician.
- Franca Falcucci, 88, Italian politician, Minister of Education (1982–1987).
- Mohammed Fazal, 92, Indian politician, Governor of Maharashtra (2002–2004).
- Willie Finlay, 88, Scottish footballer (East Fife).
- Philip Hough, 90, English cricketer (Cheshire, Wiltshire).
- David T. Kennedy, 80, American politician.
- Włodzimierz Kotoński, 89, Polish composer.
- Gerrit Kouwenaar, 91, Dutch poet, recipient of the P. C. Hooft Award (1970).
- Georges Kunz, 92, French Olympic sprint canoeist.
- Claudius Léger, 93, Canadian politician.
- Roy Leonard, 83, American radio personality (WGN), esophageal infection.
- Hopeton Lewis, 66, Jamaican singer, kidney failure.
- Edi Mall, 90, Austrian Olympic alpine skier.
- Mizchif, 38, Zimbabwean rapper.
- Habib Wali Mohammad, 93, Pakistani ghazal singer.
- Maggie Morris, 88, Canadian radio and television personality (Flashback).
- Ron Mulock, 84, Australian politician, Deputy Premier of New South Wales (1984–1988).
- John Ondawame, 60, Indonesian-born Swedish activist, advocate for West Papuan independence, heart attack.
- Orunamamu, 93, American storyteller.
- Joseph B. Raynor Jr., 91, American politician, member of the North Carolina Senate (1965–1992).
- Jacqueline Risset, 78, French poet.
- Joan Rivers, 81, American comedian, actress (Spaceballs) and television host (Fashion Police), cardiac arrest.
- Ichirō Satsuki, 95, Japanese rōkyoku performer.
- Hagen Schulze, 71, German historian.
- Edgar Steele, 69, American lawyer and convicted criminal.
- David Wynne, 88, British sculptor.

=== 5 ===
- Rubel Ahmed, 26, Bangladeshi immigrant to Britain, suspected heart attack.
- Simone Battle, 25, American singer (G.R.L.), suicide by hanging.
- Kerrie Biddell, 67, Australian jazz and session singer, stroke.
- Feroze Butt, 72, Pakistani Test cricket umpire.
- Karel Černý, 92, Czech art director and production designer (Amadeus).
- Ramkanai Das, 78-79, Bangladeshi folk and classical musician.
- Arnold Fine, 90, American editor (The Jewish Press) and humor columnist.
- Noel Hinners, 78, American scientist and administrator, NASA Chief Scientist (1987–1989), brain tumor.
- Sanford Kadish, 92, American criminal law scholar.
- David Lomax, 76, British television reporter and interviewer (Panorama).
- Nicole Lubtchansky, French film editor (Celine and Julie Go Boating, La Belle Noiseuse).
- Francis Machinsky, 79, American football player (Toronto Argonauts).
- Todor Manolov, 63, Bulgarian Olympic athlete.
- Toddrick McIntosh, 42, American football player (Tampa Bay Buccaneers, Dallas Cowboys, New Orleans Saints), stroke.
- Bruce Morton, 83, American news correspondent (CBS, CNN), cancer.
- Mara Neusel, 50, German mathematician.
- Wolfhart Pannenberg, 85, German theologian.
- Ken Reed, 72, American CFL player (Edmonton Eskimos, Saskatchewan Roughriders), traffic collision.
- Walt Robertson, 88, Canadian Olympic rower.
- Hemendra Chandra Singh, 46, Indian politician.
- William Winkelman, 81, American politician.
- Eoin Young, 75, New Zealand motoring journalist.

=== 6 ===
- Peter F. B. Alsop, Australian engineer and historian.
- Arne Amundsen, 62, Norwegian footballer (Lillestrøm SK).
- Clyde F. Bel Jr., 82, American businessman.
- Odd Bondevik, 73, Norwegian theologian.
- Dominique Darbois, 89, French photojournalist.
- Andy DePaul, 85, American boxer.
- Jim Dobbin, 73, British politician, MP for Heywood and Middleton (since 1997).
- Hendrik Fernandez, 81, Indonesian politician, Governor of East Nusa Tenggara (1988–1993), complications from a stroke.
- Cirilo Flores, 66, American Roman Catholic prelate, Bishop of San Diego (since 2013), prostate cancer.
- Stefan Gierasch, 88, American actor (Carrie, Dark Shadows, High Plains Drifter).
- Édith Girard, 65, French architect.
- Molly Glynn, 46, American actress (Chicago Fire, In America), struck by falling tree.
- Martin Harrison, 65, British-born Australian poet, heart attack.
- János Héder, 80, Hungarian Olympic gymnast.
- Seth Martin, 81, Canadian Olympic ice hockey player (Spokane Jets, St. Louis Blues), heart attack.
- Royal Nebeker, 69, American painter and print maker.
- Howard A. Ozmon, 84, American philosopher.
- A. W. Pryor, 86, Australian physicist.
- Emma Richards, 87, American pastor, first female pastor of a Mennonite congregation.
- Alvord Wolff, 96, American college football player.
- Yoko Yamaguchi, 77, Japanese songwriter and novelist, winner of the Naoki Prize (1985), respiratory failure.
- Kira Zvorykina, 94, Soviet-born Belarusian chess player, triple national champion (1960, 1973, 1975).

=== 7 ===
- Genrikh Abaev, 81, Belarusian engineer.
- Nikolay Adamets, 30, Belarusian footballer (Granit Mikashevichi), cerebral hemorrhage.
- Jacque Batt, 88, American political figure, First Lady of Idaho.
- Vasu Chanchlani, 62, Indo-Canadian serial entrepreneur, philanthropist and trans-nations builder.
- Jack Cristil, 88, American radio sports broadcaster (Mississippi State Bulldogs), complications from kidney disease and cancer.
- Maryna Doroshenko, 33, Ukrainian basketball player (national team), leukemia.
- Joseph B. Ebbesen, 89, American politician and optometrist.
- Harry Evans, 68, Australian public servant, Clerk of the Australian Senate (1988–2009).
- Raul M. Gonzalez, 83, Filipino politician, Secretary of Justice (2004–2009), multiple organ failure.
- Don Keefer, 98, American actor (Butch Cassidy and the Sundance Kid, Gunsmoke, The Twilight Zone).
- Zsolt Kézdi-Kovács, 78, Hungarian film director.
- Subramanian Krishnamoorthy, 84–85, Indian Tamil writer.
- Kwon Ri-se, 23, South Korean singer (Ladies' Code), injuries sustained in a traffic collision.
- Neal Peters McCurn, 88, American federal judge.
- Frederic Mullally, 96, British journalist and novelist.
- Anahita Ratebzad, 82, Afghan politician and diplomat.
- Tim Rudnick, 62, American football player (Baltimore Colts).
- Tom Saidock, 84, American football player (New York Titans, Philadelphia Eagles, Buffalo Bills).
- Eberhard Schlotter, 93, German painter.
- Harold Shipp, 88, Canadian businessman.
- Douglas E. Smith, 53, American video game designer (Lode Runner).
- Elsa-Marianne von Rosen, 90, Swedish ballet dancer and actress.
- Yoshiko Yamaguchi, 94, Chinese-born Japanese actress (Eternity) and singer, member of the House of Councillors (1974–1992), heart failure.

=== 8 ===
- Roger Auque, 58, French journalist and diplomat, Ambassador to Eritrea (2009–2012), cancer.
- Marvin Barnes, 62, American basketball player.
- Robert Bauer, 64, German mycologist.
- Lee Behel, 64, American air racer, plane crash.
- Désiré Carré, 91, French footballer.
- S. Truett Cathy, 93, American restaurateur and businessman, founder of Chick-fil-A.
- Errol Clince, 61, New Zealand hunter, cancer.
- Erhard Egidi, 85, German cantor and organist.
- Mary G. Enig, 83, American nutritionist.
- Rashi Fein, 88, American professor of health economics.
- Bobby Fong, 64, American academic, President of Ursinus College (since 2011).
- Justin Gocke, 36, American actor (Santa Barbara, Simon & Simon), suicide by gunshot.
- Goose Gonsoulin, 76, American football player (Denver Broncos).
- René Guissart, 84, French Olympic rower.
- Edward R. Hauser, 98, American animal scientist.
- Yuriy Kabanov, 75, Russian sprint canoer.
- John King, 85, English painter.
- Kevin O'Neill, 95, Australian cricketer.
- Sean O'Haire, 43, American professional wrestler (WWE, WCW, NJPW), suicide by hanging.
- Magda Olivero, 104, Italian operatic soprano.
- David Osler, 93, American architect.
- Tibor Rudas, 94, Hungarian entrepreneur.
- Ken Staples, 87, American baseball player, coach and manager.
- Gerald Wilson, 96, American jazz musician, pneumonia.
- George Zuverink, 90, American baseball player (Baltimore Orioles), pneumonia.

=== 9 ===
- Montserrat Abelló i Soler, 96, Spanish poet and translator.
- Hassan Aboud, 35-36, Syrian rebel leader, bomb attack.
- Firoza Begum, 84, Bangladeshi singer.
- Emilio Botín, 79, Spanish financier (Santander Group).
- Neil Brown, 62, Australian footballer.
- Vaduvur Srinivasa Desikachariar, 85, Indian scholar.
- Howell Evans, 86, Welsh actor (Stella).
- Samuel Gitler Hammer, 81, Mexican mathematician.
- Graham Joyce, 59, British speculative fantasy author, cancer.
- Denny Miller, 80, American actor (Tarzan, the Ape Man, Wagon Train), amyotrophic lateral sclerosis.
- Bob Suter, 57, American ice hockey player, Olympic champion (1980), heart attack.
- Tang Yijie, 87, Chinese philosopher.
- Antonín Tučapský, 86, Czech-born British composer.
- David Whyte, 43, English footballer (Charlton Athletic).
- Robert Young, 49, Scottish guitarist (Primal Scream).

=== 10 ===
- Domenico Carattino, 94, Italian Olympic sailor.
- Robert William Dean, 94, American diplomat.
- Grant Dunlap, 90, American baseball player (St. Louis Cardinals).
- Ntiero Effiom, 67, Nigerian football coach.
- António Garrido, 81, Portuguese football referee.
- Richard Kiel, 74, American actor (The Spy Who Loved Me, Happy Gilmore, Tangled), heart attack.
- Oldřich František Korte, 88, Czech composer and pianist.
- Walter L. McVey Jr., 92, American politician.
- Edward Nelson, 82, American mathematician, professor emeritus (Princeton University).
- Yoshinori Sakai, 69, Japanese athlete, lit cauldron at the 1964 Summer Olympics, cerebral hemorrhage.
- Károly Sándor, 85, Hungarian footballer.
- George Spencer, 88, American baseball player (New York Giants).
- Paul K. Sybrowsky, 70, American businessman, President of Southern Virginia University (2012–2014).
- Hans Petter Tholfsen, 67, Norwegian harness racer.
- Joakim Vislavski, 73, Serbian football player (Partizan) and manager (Hajduk Kula).
- Ernst Wilfer, 91, German engineer.

=== 11 ===
- John A. Burroughs Jr., 78, American diplomat.
- Bob Crewe, 82, American songwriter ("Big Girls Don't Cry", "Rag Doll") and record producer (The Four Seasons).
- John F. Cusack, 76, American politician.
- Antoine Duhamel, 89, French composer and conductor.
- Fletcher Dulini Ncube, 74, Zimbabwean politician.
- Mirko Ellis, 91, Swiss-Italian actor, self-defenestration.
- Kendall Francois, 43, American serial killer.
- Basil Charles Elwell French, 95, British Anglican priest.
- Joachim Fuchsberger, 87, German actor (Edgar Wallace movies), television host and lyricist.
- Jerônimo Garcia de Santana, 79, Brazilian politician, Governor of Rondônia (1987–1991), Mayor of Porto Velho (1986).
- Joanne Garvey, 79, American attorney.
- Hamish McHamish, 15, Scottish celebrity cat, chest infection.
- Rudolf Kortokraks, 86, German painter.
- Cosimo Matassa, 88, American recording engineer and studio owner.
- Russ Tyson, 94, American radio announcer and television presenter.
- Elizabeth Whelan, 71, American consumer rights activist, founder of the American Council on Science and Health.
- Ali Yahya, 66, Israeli diplomat.

=== 12 ===
- Vasile Anghel, 76, Romanian footballer.
- Edmundo Domínguez Aragonés, 75, Mexican journalist.
- Mahant Avaidyanath, 93, Indian politician.
- John Bardon, 75, English actor (EastEnders).
- Fred Britton, 82, Canadian curler.
- André Dran, 90, French singer.
- Atef Ebeid, 82, Egyptian politician, Prime Minister (1999–2004).
- Salah El Mahdi, 89, Tunisian musicologist and composer.
- Peter Erős, 81, Hungarian-American conductor, cerebral hemorrhage.
- Theodore J. Flicker, 84, American writer and director (Barney Miller, The President's Analyst).
- Joseph Abangite Gasi, 86, South Sudanese Roman Catholic prelate, Bishop of Tombura-Yambio (1974–2008).
- John Gustafson, 72, English singer and bassist (Ian Gillan Band, Roxy Music, The Big Three).
- Henrik Have, 68, Danish artist and writer.
- Antony Kidman, 75, Australian psychologist and academic, heart attack.
- Irwin I. Kimmelman, 84, American politician.
- Zoran Knežević, 66, Serbian Yugoslav politician and judge.
- Lonnie Lynn, 71, American basketball player (Pittsburgh Pipers) and spoken word poet.
- Anwar Ali Noon, 90, Pakistani politician.
- Ian Paisley, Baron Bannside, 88, Northern Irish politician, first minister (2007–2008), MP (1970–2010) and member of the House of Lords (since 2010).
- Warren Perkins, 92, American basketball player (Tri-Cities Blackhawks).
- Dimitry Pospielovsky, 79, Canadian historian.
- Hugh Royer Jr., 78, American professional golfer.
- Bengt Saltin, 79, Swedish physiologist.
- Joe Sample, 75, American jazz musician (The Crusaders), and songwriter ("One Day I'll Fly Away", "Street Life").
- Sir Donald Sinden, 90, English actor (The Cruel Sea, The Day of the Jackal, Two's Company), prostate cancer.
- Ts'ao Yung-ho, 93, Taiwanese historian.
- Herbert Vorgrimler, 85, German theologian.
- Zhou Weizhi, 98, Chinese musician and politician, Minister of culture.
- Harold Williams, 90, Welsh football player.
- Christopher Wray, 74, English actor (Emmerdale, Doctor Who, Z-Cars) and businessman.
- Abdel Rahman Zuabi, 82, Israeli judge.

=== 13 ===
- Benjamin Adekunle, 78, Nigerian army leader.
- Bjørn Tore Bryn, 77, Norwegian news anchor.
- Marvin Cheung, 67, Hong Kong accountant and politician, Chairman of the AAHK (2008–2014), unofficial member of the Executive Council (2005–2012), leukemia.
- Luis Colman, 60, Uruguayan Olympic rower.
- Robert M. Ellis, 92, American artist.
- Iberê Ferreira, 70, Brazilian politician, Governor of Rio Grande do Norte (2010–2011).
- Helen Filarski, 90, American baseball player (AAGPBL).
- Milan Galić, 76, Serbian Yugoslav Olympic champion footballer (1960), (national team).
- David Haines, 44, British humanitarian aid worker and ISIS hostage, beheading. (death reported on this date)
- Shelley Riley Moore, 88, American educator, First Lady of West Virginia (1969–1977, 1985–1989).
- Dmitry Sakunenko, 84, Russian Soviet Olympic speed skater (1956).
- Matthew Sands, 94, American physicist.
- Frank Torre, 82, American baseball player (Milwaukee Braves, Philadelphia Phillies), cardiac arrest.
- Paul Valenti, 94, American college basketball coach (Oregon State).
- Nigel Walker, 97, British criminologist, Wolfson Professor of Criminology (1973–1984).

=== 14 ===
- Isidoro Álvarez, 79, Spanish businessman, CEO of El Corte Inglés.
- Tony Auth, 72, American Pulitzer Prize-winning cartoonist, cancer.
- Behrens, 20, American thoroughbred racehorse.
- Bruno Castanheira, 37, Portuguese racing cyclist.
- Saifuddin Choudhury, 62, Indian politician, leader of the CPI(M), cancer.
- Servílio Conti, 97, Italian-born Brazilian Roman Catholic prelate, Bishop of Roraima (1965–1975).
- Thoma Deliana, 88-89, Albanian politician.
- José Gómez, 70, American civil rights activist and academic.
- Assheton Gorton, 84, English production designer (101 Dalmatians, Legend, The French Lieutenant's Woman).
- Peter Gutteridge, 53, New Zealand singer and guitarist (The Clean, The Chills, Snapper).
- Miroslav Hlinka, 42, Slovak ice hockey player, gold medalist at the 2002 IIHF World Championship, suicide by hanging.
- Takatada Ihara, 85, Japanese television producer and director, heart disease.
- Kireet Joshi, 83, Indian philosopher and educationist, cancer.
- Boris Khimichev, 81, Russian actor.
- Benoy Krishna Konar, 84, Indian politician, member of the West Bengal Legislative Assembly.
- Angus Lennie, 84, Scottish actor (The Great Escape, Crossroads, Doctor Who).
- Charles Philip Littlejohn, 91, New Zealand judge.
- Predrag Manojlović, 62, Yugoslavian Olympic water polo player.
- E. Jennifer Monaghan, 81, English-born American historian, stroke.
- Chase N. Peterson, 84, American physician and academic, President of the University of Utah (1983–1991).
- Vincent Scoper, 81, American politician, esophageal cancer.
- Philip Somerville, 84, English milliner.
- Dick Thompson, 94, American racecar driver, pneumonia.
- Ellen R. Thompson, 85, American composer.

=== 15 ===
- Iwao Akiyama, 93, Japanese printmaker.
- John Anderson Jr., 97, American politician, Governor of Kansas (1961–1965).
- Jeremy Ball, 45, Australian politician and actor (The Matrix), Deputy Mayor of Launceston, Tasmania (since 2011), traffic collision.
- Ted Belytschko, 71, American mechanical engineer.
- Giuliana Berlinguer, 80, Italian director, screenwriter, and novelist.
- Roger Blomquist, 57, Swedish sports journalist (SVT).
- Post Bahadur Bogati, 61, Nepalese politician, brain hemorrhage following cardiac arrest.
- Thomas Hale Boggs Jr., 73, American lawyer, lobbyist and politician, heart attack.
- Jackie Cain, 86, American jazz vocalist (Jackie and Roy), complications from a stroke.
- Waldemar Capucci, 85, Brazilian Olympic sport shooter.
- Dame Peggy Fenner, 91, British politician, MP for Rochester and Chatham (1970–1974, 1979–1997).
- Eugene I. Gordon, 84, American physicist.
- Yitzhak Hofi, 87, Israeli general, Director of Mossad (1974–1982).
- Nicholas Romanov, Prince of Russia, 91, French-born Russian claimant to the headship of the House of Romanov (since 1992).
- Jürg Schubiger, 77, Swiss psychotherapist and children's author.
- Claude A. Simard, 71, Canadian painter.
- Wayne Tefs, 67, Canadian writer, cancer.
- Marjorie Thompson, 60, American biologist and musician.
- François Wahl, 89, French literary editor.
- Glen Whitten, 78, American Olympic diver.

=== 16 ===
- Edward Atienza, 90, British actor.
- Lloyd Blackman, 86, Canadian musician.
- E. Leslie Conkling, 82, American politician.
- Narendra Dave, 64, Kenyan cricket umpire.
- Grant Evans, 65, Australian anthropologist and historian.
- H. M. Fowler, 96, American politician.
- Michael Hayes, 85, British television director (Doctor Who, Z-Cars, An Age of Kings) and newsreader.
- Buster Jones, 71, American voice actor (Super Friends, The Transformers, The Real Ghostbusters).
- Jef Lataster, 92, Dutch Olympic long-distance runner (1948).
- John Moat, 78, British poet, founded the Arvon Foundation.
- Alf Ivar Samuelsen, 72, Norwegian politician, tractor crash.
- Mary Speer, 89, American southern gospel singer (Speer Family).
- Donald K. Stitt, 69, American politician.
- Linganath Subbu, 83, Indian cricketer.
- Dinis Vital, 82, Portuguese footballer.
- Phil Willmarth, 83, American magician, cancer.

=== 17 ===
- Hari Kumar Audichya, 84, Indian politician.
- Glenn D. Broyles, 88, American politician.
- Edward Fletcher Cass, 77, British miner and banker.
- Marianne Clausen, 66, Danish musicologist and choir conductor.
- Lisa Ann Coleman, 38, American criminal, executed.
- Renée Klang de Guzmán, 97, Dominican philanthropist, First Lady of the Dominican Republic (1978–1982).
- George Hamilton IV, 77, American country music singer (Abilene), complications from a heart attack.
- Andriy Husin, 41, Ukrainian football player (Dynamo Kyiv, Krylia Sovetov, national team) and coach, traffic collision.
- Wakachichibu Komei, 75, Japanese sumo wrestler.
- Gerald A. Larue, 98, American religious scholar and skeptic, stroke.
- Elaine Lee, 74, South African-born Australian actress (Number 96).
- John Lofton, 73, American political commentator.
- Sir Charles Read, 95, Australian air marshal.
- Jeff Staggs, 70, American football player (San Diego Chargers, St. Louis Cardinals).
- Street Cry, 16, Irish thoroughbred racehorse, euthanised.
- Lorna Thomas, 96, Australian cricket player and manager.
- Welby Van Horn, 94, American tennis player and coach.
- Peter von Bagh, 71, Finnish film historian.
- China Zorrilla, 92, Uruguayan actress (Elsa & Fred), pneumonia.

=== 18 ===
- Richard Arenstorf, 84, American mathematician.
- Shakil Auj, 54, Pakistani Islamic researcher and scholar, shot.
- Jan Berdyszak, 78, Polish artist.
- Margie Day, 88, American R&B singer.
- Oleg Ivanovsky, 92, Russian spacecraft designer (Vostok, Prognoz).
- Patrick Lowry, 77, Irish Olympic sprinter.
- Milan Marcetta, 77, Canadian ice hockey player (Toronto Maple Leafs, Minnesota North Stars).
- Will Radcliff, 74, American businessman, creator of the Slush Puppie.
- George Radwanski, 67, Canadian journalist and civil servant, Privacy Commissioner (2000–2003), heart attack.
- Earl Ross, 73, Canadian race car driver.
- Hirofumi Uzawa, 86, Japanese economist, pneumonia.
- Olivier Vanneste, 84, Belgian politician and economist, Governor of West Flanders (1979–1997).
- Kenny Wheeler, 84, Canadian jazz trumpeter.

=== 19 ===
- André Bergeron, 92, French trade union leader.
- Hans-Georg Bohle, 66, German geographer.
- Keith Brueckner, 90, American theoretical physicist.
- Milton Cardona, 69, Puerto Rican jazz musician, heart failure.
- Püreviin Dagvasüren, 71, Mongolian traditional wrestler.
- Bill Detrick, 87, American college basketball coach (Central Connecticut Blue Devils).
- Peggy Drake, 91, Austrian-born American actress (King of the Mounties).
- Marcel Dussault, 88, French road racing cyclist.
- Francisco Feliciano, 73, Filipino composer and conductor.
- Donald Hayden, 77, American politician, member of the New Jersey General Assembly (1994–1996).
- Avraham Heffner, 79, Israeli filmmaker (Laura Adler's Last Love Affair).
- Jaap Leemhuis, 72, Dutch Olympic field hockey player.
- Audrey Long, 92, American film actress (Tall in the Saddle).
- Robert Long, 77, British army officer.
- Iain MacCormick, 74, Scottish politician, MP for Argyll (1974–1979).
- H. Tyler Marcy, 96, American business executive (IBM).
- Wilbur Waldo Mayhew, 94, American biologist.
- Rod Milgate, 80, Australian painter, playwright and newsreader, heart attack.
- John Mlacak, 78, Canadian politician and artist.
- Hilda Oates, 89, Cuban actress.
- Bronisław Pawlicki, 88, Polish Olympic field hockey player (1952).
- Joe Schorgl, 92, American politician.
- U. Srinivas, 45, Indian mandolin player, complications from a liver transplant.
- Toeko Tatsuno, 64, Japanese painter, metastatic liver cancer.
- K. Udayakumar, 54, Indian volleyball player, cardiac arrest.
- Derek Williams, 89, Welsh rugby union player (Cardiff).

=== 20 ===
- Anton-Günther, Duke of Oldenburg, 91, German noble.
- Anatoly Berezovoy, 72, Soviet cosmonaut (Soyuz T-5).
- Polly Bergen, 84, American singer and actress (Cape Fear, Cry-Baby, Desperate Housewives), Emmy winner (1958).
- Rob Bironas, 36, American football player (Tennessee Titans), traffic collision.
- Ron Bishop, 71, American off-road motorcycle racer.
- Erich Bloch, 75, Zimbabwean economist.
- Hal Burrows, 89, American tennis player.
- Vince Callahan, 82, American politician, member of the Virginia House of Delegates (1968–2008), West Nile meningitis.
- Pino Cerami, 92, Italian-born Belgian cyclist.
- J. California Cooper, 82, American playwright and author.
- Takako Doi, 85, Japanese politician, Speaker of the House of Representatives (1993–1996), pneumonia.
- Eric the Actor, 39, American dwarf, member of The Wack Pack.
- Odette Gartenlaub, 92, French pianist and composer.
- Kamara James, 29, Jamaican-born American Olympic fencer (2004).
- Ashok Ramchandra Kelkar, 85, Indian linguist and writer.
- John J. Lloyd, 92, American art director and production designer (Animal House, The Blues Brothers, The Thing), heart failure.
- Erik Ninn-Hansen, 92, Danish politician.
- Kazusuke Ogawa, 84, Japanese literary critic, stomach cancer.
- Randy Pike, 60, American politician, member of the Missouri House of Representatives (since 2012).
- Alfred Prinz, 84, Austrian composer and clarinetist.
- Igor Radin, 76, Serbian Yugoslav Olympic ice hockey player.
- Ramón Rojas, 35, Chilean BASE jumper, training accident.
- George Sluizer, 82, Dutch filmmaker (The Vanishing), cardiovascular disease.
- Erwin Sparendam, 80, Surinamese-born Dutch footballer.
- Ricki Starr, 83, American-born British professional wrestler.
- Şeref Taşlıova, 76, Turkish storyteller.
- M. B. W. Tent, 69, American author and educator.

=== 21 ===
- Shirley Baker, 82, British photographer.
- Les Bruckner, 96, American football player.
- Diana Capponi, 61, Canadian mental health activist, breast cancer.
- Cecilia Cenci, 72, Argentine actress, brain cancer.
- Anne-Marie Deschodt, French actress and writer.
- Francesco Fornabaio, 57, Italian aviator and aerobatic pilot, plane crash.
- Linda Griffiths, 60, Canadian actress and playwright, breast cancer.
- Michael Harari, 87, Israeli intelligence officer.
- Lori Heiser, 86, American politician.
- Caldwell Jones, 64, American basketball player (Philadelphia 76ers, Portland Trail Blazers), heart attack.
- Ed Koffenberger, 88, American basketball and lacrosse player (Duke University), leukemia.
- Galina Konovalova, 98, Russian actress (Uncle Vanya).
- Ruben Kun, 72, Nauruan politician, President (1996–1997) and Speaker of Parliament (1981–1986).
- John Chrysostom Lan Shi, 89, Chinese Roman Catholic prelate, Bishop of Sanyuan (2003–2008).
- Ray David Owen, 98, American immunologist.
- Sheldon Patinkin, 79, American theatre director.
- Joseph Plaskett, 96, Canadian painter.
- Alastair Reid, 88, Scottish poet and scholar.
- Scott Ross, 45, American football player (New Orleans Saints), heart failure.
- Jan Werner, 68, Polish sprinter, Olympic silver medalist (1976).

=== 22 ===
- Nanda Prasad Adhikari, 51–53, Nepali activist.
- Sir Edward Anson, 85, Australian-British vice admiral.
- Fernando Cabrita, 91, Portuguese football player and manager.
- Alexey Chervonenkis, 76, Russian mathematician (Vapnik–Chervonenkis theory).
- Anandji Dossa, 98, Indian cricket statistician.
- Peter Evans, 86, Welsh rugby union player.
- Joseph Gurzenda, 77, American politician.
- Ezra Heymann, 86, Venezuelan philosopher.
- Serge Kujawa, 89, Polish-born Canadian politician.
- Ray Lambrecht, 96, American car dealer.
- Nikita Larionov, 82, Russian writer.
- Skip E. Lowe, 85, American talk show host, emphysema.
- E. J. Mishan, 96, English economist.
- Samira Saleh Ali al-Naimi, 50–51, Iraqi human rights activist and lawyer, executed.
- Billy Neil, 75, Scottish footballer (Queen's Park, Airdrieonians).
- Sahana Pradhan, 88, Nepalese politician, brain haemorrhage.
- Jason Rabedeaux, 49, American college basketball coach.
- Alexis Sarei, 80, Papua New Guinean politician and diplomat, Premier of North Solomons Province (1976–1980, 1984–1987).
- Cara Silverman, 54, American film editor (Super, He's Just Not That Into You, A Cinderella Story).
- Erik van der Wurff, 69, Dutch pianist and composer, cancer.
- Flor Van Noppen, 58, Belgian politician, MP (2007–2014), multiple system atrophy.
- Hans E. Wallman, 78, Swedish film director, producer and composer, injuries sustained in a horse riding accident.
- Ben Webb, 38, New Zealand artist.
- Greeley Wells, 94, American politician.

=== 23 ===
- Alaviyya Babayeva, 93, Azerbaijani writer and translator, People's Artist of the Azerbaijani SSR.
- Myrtle Baylis, 94, Australian cricket and netball international.
- A. W. Davis, 71, American basketball player (University of Tennessee) and coach.
- Irven DeVore, 79, American anthropologist.
- John Divers, 74, Scottish footballer.
- Anatoly Eiramdzhan, 77, Russian-Armenian film director.
- Robin Freeman, 80, American college basketball player (Ohio State).
- Mullah Ghani, Afghan politician, Governor of Nimruz Province (1995), shot.
- Henryk Glücklich, 69, Polish speedway rider.
- Gabriel Gómez Michel, 49, Mexican politician, MP for Jalisco (since 2012), homicide. (body discovered on this date)
- Gilles Latulippe, 77, Canadian comedian, actor and theatre manager, lung cancer.
- Don Manoukian, 80, American football player (Oakland Raiders).
- Kresimir Sipusch, 84, Croatian-born Yugoslav composer and conductor.
- Al Suomi, 100, American professional hockey player (Chicago Blackhawks).
- George Herbert Swift Jr, 88, American mathematician and computer scientist.
- Tom Tombrello, 78, American physicist.
- Abu Yusuf Al-Turki, 47, Turkish terrorist, commander of al-Nusra Front, air strike. (death reported on this date)
- Shankar Vaidya, 86, Indian Marathi poet and writer.
- Margaret Vogt, 64, Nigerian diplomat.
- John Baptist Wang Jin, 90, Chinese Roman Catholic prelate, Bishop of Yuci (since 1999).
- Don Wollett, 95, American author, arbiter and college professor.

=== 24 ===
- Mohsen Amiraslani, 36-37, Iranian psychoanalyst, execution.
- Catherine Beattie, 93, American farmer and politician.
- Eckart Berkes, 65, German Olympic hurdler (1972).
- Fred Branfman, 72, American author and anti-war activist, amyotrophic lateral sclerosis.
- Ron Butlin, 89, Canadian ice hockey executive.
- Deborah Cavendish, Duchess of Devonshire, 94, British writer and socialite, last surviving Mitford sister.
- Gloria Dougal, 83, American baseball player (Muskegon Belles).
- Sir Edward Eveleigh, 96, British judge, Lord Justice of Appeal.
- Ailo Gaup, 70, Norwegian Sami author.
- Reuben Greenberg, 71, American police chief.
- Sebastian Haag, 35, German extreme skier and mountaineer, avalanche.
- Christopher Hogwood, 73, English conductor.
- Carlotta Ikeda, 73, Japanese butoh dancer, liver cancer.
- Ray Isherwood, 76, Australian cricket umpire.
- Ken James, 80, Canadian politician, MP for Sarnia—Lambton (1984–1993).
- Vladimir Kadyshevsky, 76, Russian theoretical physicist.
- Madis Kõiv, 84, Estonian author, physicist and philosopher.
- Nancy Virtue Lewis, 64, American politician.
- Greg Mackey, 52, Australian rugby league player (South Sydney, Warrington, Hull F.C.), bowel cancer.
- Sir Gordon Manzie, 84, British civil servant, Chief Executive of the Property Services Agency.
- Lily McBeth, 80, American transgender teacher.
- Hugh J. McLaughlin, 98, American politician.
- Jack Mezirow, 91, American educationalist.
- Karl Miller, 83, British literary editor (The Listener, London Review of Books).
- Priscilla Mitchell, 73, American country music singer.
- Hugh C. Rae, 78, Scottish author.
- Derek Roe, 77, British archaeologist, cancer.
- David T. Schneider, 91, American diplomat.
- Stephen Sykes, 75, English Anglican prelate, Bishop of Ely (1990–1999).

=== 25 ===
- Toby Balding, 78, American-born British racehorse trainer.
- Ulrick Chérubin, 70, Haitian-born Canadian politician, Mayor of Amos, Quebec (since 2002).
- Vladimir Dolbonosov, 65, Russian footballer (Dynamo Moscow).
- Stefan Grimm, 51, German biologist, suicide by asphyxiation.
- István Hernek, 79, Hungarian Olympic sprint canoer.
- Jaak Joala, 64, Estonian Soviet singer.
- Jim Kincaid, 84, American football player (Washington Redskins).
- Maria Grazia Mancuso, 58, Italian Olympic gymnast.
- Rudolf Morgenthaler, 88, Swiss Olympic long-distance runner.
- Bonnie Lynn Tempesta, 61, American food manufacturer, cancer.
- Sulejman Tihić, 62, Bosnian politician, Member of the Presidency (2002–2006), cancer.
- Dorothy Tyler-Odam, 94, British athlete, Olympic silver medalist (1936, 1948).
- Christine Vladimiroff, 74, American nun.
- Barbara Washburn, 99, American mountaineer, first woman to climb Denali.
- Cedric Wyatt, 74, Australian public servant and indigenous rights advocate.

=== 26 ===
- Alexander Chamberlain Alexis, 93, Trinidad and Tobago politician.
- Michaela Andörfer, 85, German Roman Catholic nun.
- Jim Boeke, 76, American football player (Dallas Cowboys) and actor (Coach, Star Trek VI: The Undiscovered Country).
- Charles Dobzynski, 84-85, French poet, journalist and translator.
- Wouter Gortzak, 83, Dutch journalist (Het Parool) and politician, member of the House of Representatives (1998–2002).
- Hermann Greiner, 94, German World War II flying ace.
- Sam Hall, 93, American television writer (Dark Shadows, One Life to Live).
- Astrid Dirdal Hegrestad, 85, Norwegian politician.
- Wolfgang Hutter, 85, Austrian artist.
- Michael McCarty, 68, American actor (Loving, The Legend of Bagger Vance, Dunston Checks In), heart failure.
- Tony McMichael, 71, Australian epidemiologist, complications of pneumonia.
- Gerry Neugebauer, 82, American astronomer, complications of spinocerebellar ataxia.
- Jocelyn Ortt-Saeed, 79, Australian-born Pakistani poet and philosopher, cancer.
- Tamir Sapir, 67, Georgian-born American businessman.
- Takamaro Shigaraki, 87–88, Japanese Buddhist philosopher.
- Arnold Short, 81, American basketball player (Phillips 66ers).
- Maggie Stables, 70, British actress (Doctor Who).
- Shao Tong, 20, Chinese student (Iowa State University), suffocated. (body discovered on this date)
- Guro Valen, 54, Norwegian professor of medicine, cancer.
- Zelda, 11+, American wild turkey, resident of New York City's Battery Park, traffic collision. (body found on this date)

=== 27 ===
- Gaby Aghion, 93, French fashion designer (Chloé).
- Gil Aldema, 86, Israeli composer and conductor.
- Angelo Arrigoni, 91, Italian rugby union and professional rugby league footballer.
- Joan Benesh, 94, British ballet dancer, pneumonia.
- Morris F. Collen, 100, American physician and bioinformatician, cancer.
- Lou Curtis, 86, Australian cricketer.
- Anna Morpurgo Davies, 77, Italian-born British philologist.
- Eugie Foster, 42, American science fiction author, respiratory failure.
- Taylor Hardwick, 89, American architect, cancer.
- Harry Harley, 88, Canadian politician, MP for Halton (1962–1968).
- Cathy Henderson, 51, Irish painter.
- Wally Hergesheimer, 87, Canadian professional ice hockey player (Chicago Blackhawks, New York Rangers).
- Park Honan, 86, American literary scholar.
- Abdelmajid Lakhal, 74, Tunisian theatre director and actor.
- Antti Lovag, 94, Hungarian architect.
- Sarah Danielle Madison, 40, American actress (7th Heaven, Jurassic Park III, Training Day).
- Dorothy Maharam, 97, American mathematician.
- Natalie McCurry, 48, Australian actress (Chances, Dead End Drive-In, Cassandra), cancer.
- Tihiro Ohkawa, 86, Japanese physicist.
- Jean-Jacques Pauvert, 88, French publisher.
- Michael Scott-Joynt, 71, English Anglican prelate, Bishop of Stafford (1987–1995) and Winchester (1995–2011).
- Earl Smith, 86, American baseball player (Pittsburgh Pirates).
- Jackie Stedall, 64, British mathematics historian, cancer.
- James Traficant, 73, American politician, member of the U.S. House of Representatives for Ohio's 17th district (1985–2002).
- Zhang Xianliang, 77, Chinese author and poet.

=== 28 ===
- Dannie Abse, 91, British doctor and poet.
- Joseph H. Alexander, 76, American historian and Marine Corps officer.
- Lisbeth Bodd, 56, Norwegian performance artist and theatre leader.
- Daniel F. Clark, 59, American politician, member of the Pennsylvania House of Representatives (1989–2002), lung cancer.
- Nicolae Corneanu, 90, Romanian Orthodox hierarch, Metropolitan of Banat (since 1962).
- Daniel Dion, 55-56, Canadian artist.
- Roy Ebron, 63, American basketball player (Utah Stars).
- Jim Eley, 81, Australian footballer.
- Sheila Faith, 86, British politician, MP for Belper (1979–1983).
- Paul Fatt, 90, British neuroscientist.
- Lubomír Havlák, 92, Czech opera singer.
- Ralph Maxwell, 94, American district judge and athlete.
- Hamar Midgley, 95, Australian ichthyologist.
- Sirkka Polkunen, 86, Finnish Olympic cross-country skier.
- George R. Poulos, 87, American politician, mayor of Flint, Michigan (1962-1964).
- Tim Rawlings, 81, English footballer (West Bromwich Albion, Walsall).
- George Roberts, 86, American trombonist.
- José Luis Serna Alzate, 78, Colombian Roman Catholic prelate, Bishop of Florencia (1978–1989) and Líbano–Honda (1989–2002).
- John Sheridan, 72, American politician, former New Jersey Transportation Commissioner, stabbed.
- Petr Skoumal, 76, Czech musician and composer.
- Bob Smith, 81, American football player (Cleveland Browns, Philadelphia Eagles).
- Jakob Stämpfli, 79, Swiss bass concert singer.
- Ieke van den Burg, 62, Dutch politician, MEP (1999–2009).
- Jan Vodička, 82, Czech Olympic ice hockey player (1956).
- Sophia Yin, 48, American veterinarian and animal behaviorist, suicide by hanging.

=== 29 ===
- Warren Anderson, 92, American businessman.
- JP Auclair, 37, Canadian freestyle skier, avalanche.
- Walter Evan Black Jr., 88, American federal judge.
- Miguel Boyer, 75, French-born Spanish economist and politician, Minister of Economy, Treasury and Commerce (1982–1985), pulmonary embolism.
- Mary Cadogan, 86, British writer.
- Tarik Carson, 68, Uruguayan-born Argentine writer and painter.
- Carlo Curis, 90, Italian Roman Catholic prelate and diplomat, Apostolic Nuncio to Canada (1990–1999).
- Richard Dickerson, 77, American politician, member of the California State Assembly (1998–2002), mayor of Redding, California.
- Hugh Doherty, 93, Irish footballer (Celtic).
- Andreas Fransson, 31, Swedish extreme skier, avalanche.
- Mohammad Ghouse, 83, Indian cricket umpire.
- Stan Monteith, 85, American author and radio host.
- Luis Nishizawa, 96, Mexican painter.
- John Ritchie, 93, New Zealand composer.
- Len Ronson, 78, Canadian-born American ice hockey player (New York Rangers).
- Pat Sawilowsky, 83, American Jewish community leader.
- George Shuba, 89, American baseball player (Brooklyn Dodgers).
- Len Stephenson, 84, English footballer (Port Vale, Blackpool, Oldham Athletic).
- Austryn Wainhouse, 87, American author and translator.

=== 30 ===
- Jadir Ambrósio, 91, Brazilian musician and composer.
- Iftikhar Hussain Ansari, 72, Indian Kashmiri cleric, politician and businessman.
- Billie Barry, Irish dance instructor.
- Thomas A. Benes, 63, American Marine Corps major general, myelodysplastic syndrome.
- Kaj Björk, 95, Swedish politician and diplomat.
- Lidya Buzio, 65, Uruguayan-born American ceramist, cancer.
- Sandra Cano, 55-57, American anti-abortion activist.
- Ralph Cosham, 78, British-born American actor (Starman, The Pelican Brief, The Elder Scrolls IV: Oblivion).
- Victor Crespo, 81, Portuguese politician, President of the Assembly of the Republic (1987–1991).
- Hama Arba Diallo, 75, Burkinabé politician and diplomat.
- Roselyn P. Epps, 83, American pediatrician and public health physician.
- Peter Eriksson, 50, Swedish curler.
- Shizuko Gō, 85, Japanese author (Requiem).
- Erik Hansen, 74, Danish canoeist, Olympic champion (1960).
- Iemasa Kayumi, 80, Japanese voice actor (Lupin III, One Piece, Astro Boy).
- Jerrie Mock, 88, American pilot, first woman to fly solo around the world.
- San W. Orr Jr., 73, American businessman.
- Martin Lewis Perl, 87, American physicist, discovered the tau particle, Nobel Prize laureate in Physics (1995), heart attack.
- Ren Runhou, 56, Chinese businessman and politician.
- Yevgeny Samsonov, 88, Russian rower, Olympic silver medalist (1952).
- Sheila Tracy, 80, British broadcaster and musician (Big Band Special).
- Xu Lizhi, 24, Chinese poet and factory worker, suicide by jumping.
