= Harikumar =

Harikumar may refer to:

- Harikumar (actor), actor in Tamil movies
- Hari Kumar (director), Indian film script writer and director in Malayalam movies
- E. Harikumar, Malayalam novelist and short story writer
- N. Harikumar, sound editor and recordist known for his works in Malayalam films
- Hari Kumar Audichya, Indian politician of the Bharatiya Janata Party from Rajasthan
- Harikumar Madhavan Nair, Indian film audiographer and sound designer
