= Ernst Wilfer =

German engineer and inventor

Ernst Wilfer (February 1923, Aš, Czechoslovakia – 10 September 2014) was a German engineer and inventor specializing in construction who made a name in site management and the operation of cable cars and chairlifts.

== Life ==
Wilfer was born in Asch, now Aš in the Czech Republic. He studied engineering at the Czech Technical University in Prague, but was drafted into military service in 1942 where he fought in the German-Soviet War during World War II and was seriously wounded in Russia. He was part of the Germans that were expelled from Czechoslovakia because of the Beneš decrees and, after the Second World War, in 1946, worked as a draftsman at a Sonthofen, Germany-based design office. Later as an engineer, he built several chairlifts, more than ten of which was he also the site manager.

=== Seilbahnbau at Weigmann ===
After moving to the Weigmann company in Oberstdorf, in Allgäu, he was involved as designer and construction manager in the realization of two still operating chairlifts at Burg an der Wupper (Burg chairlift) and Rheingau (cableway Assmannshausen). Weigmann built several fixed chairlifts during the economic boom after World War II in the 1950s. The two mentioned railways in Assmannshausen and in Wupper (Remscheid-Solingen) have been in operation for almost 50 years and have not needed much repair, save for the exchange of some worn parts. In the 1950s, the small company built ski lifts and one-seater and two-seater chairlifts. The heavy steel constructions were almost indestructible and expensive. As Weigmann references, the Koblatlift in the Nebelhorn and various ski lifts in the Black Forest were in addition to the two aforementioned double chair lifts. After the early death of the owner Herbert Weigmann in 1956, the company broke up and was eventually transferred to the Hermann Heuss GmbH in Geretsried.

In 1952, under the direction of Wilfer, the first double chairlift in Germany was constructed at the Burg Castle in Solingen in just over three months of construction, which was already at that time an attraction and today is representative of a nostalgic tourist attraction.

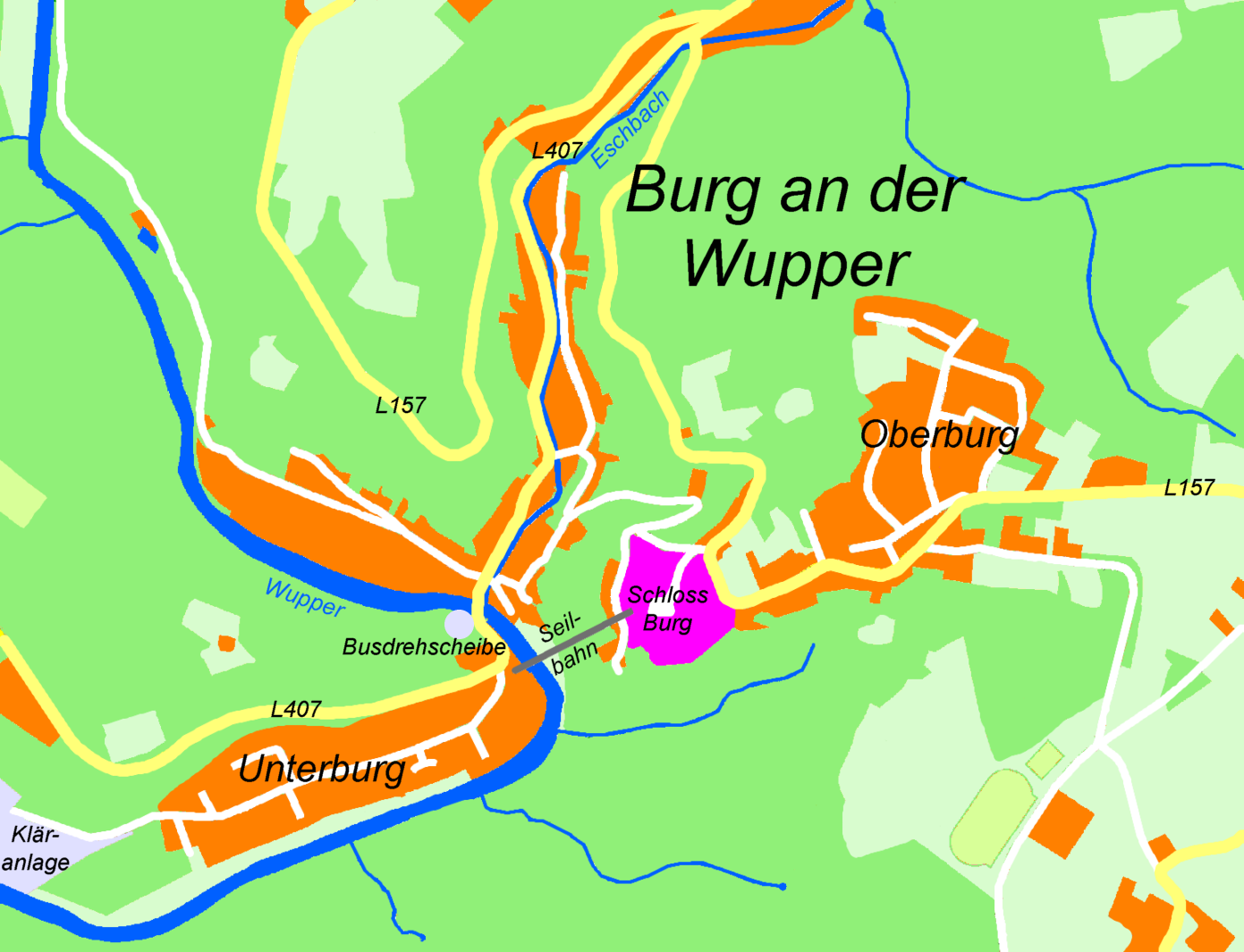
Karte von Burg an der Wupper

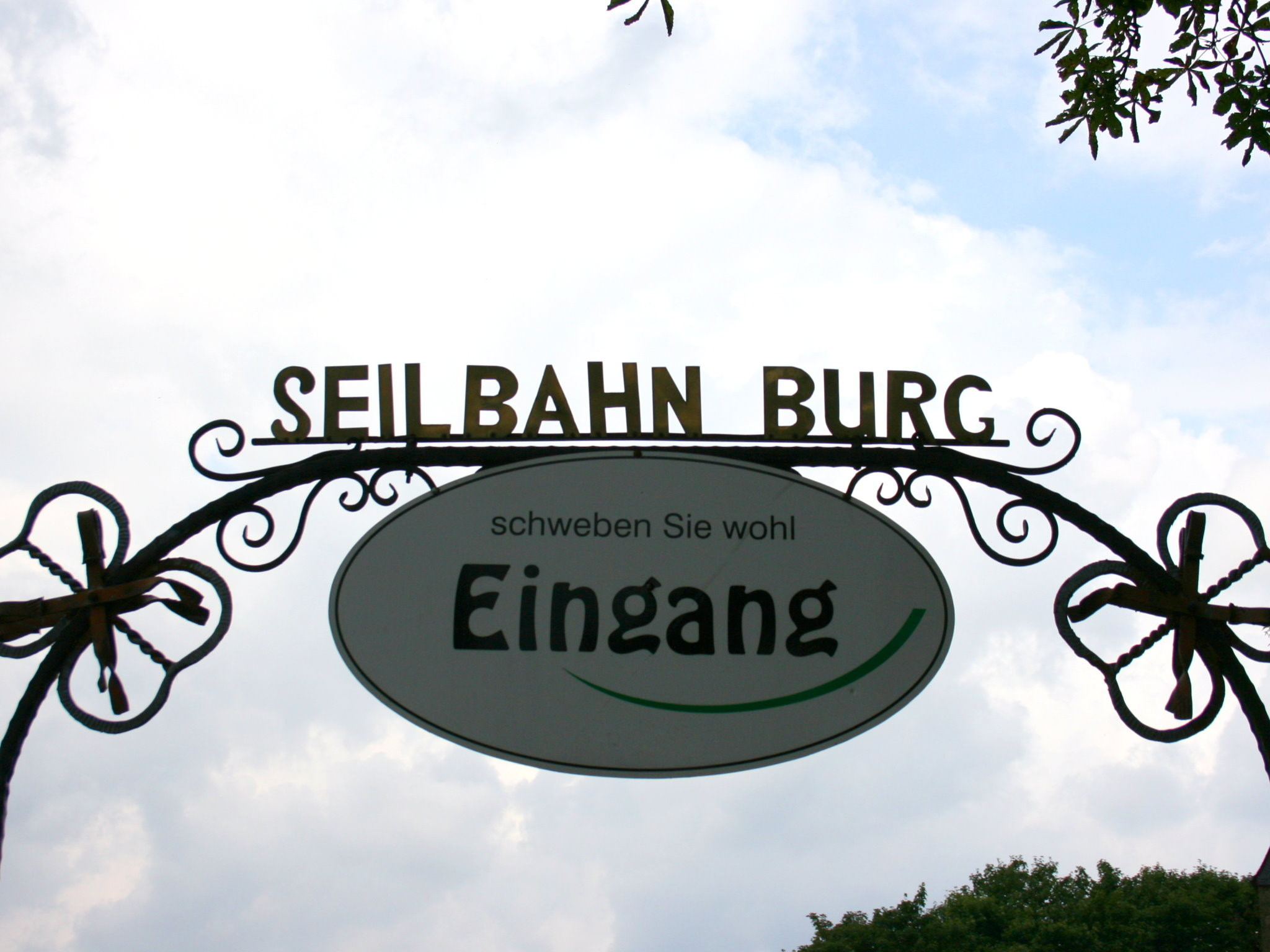
Eingangsschild

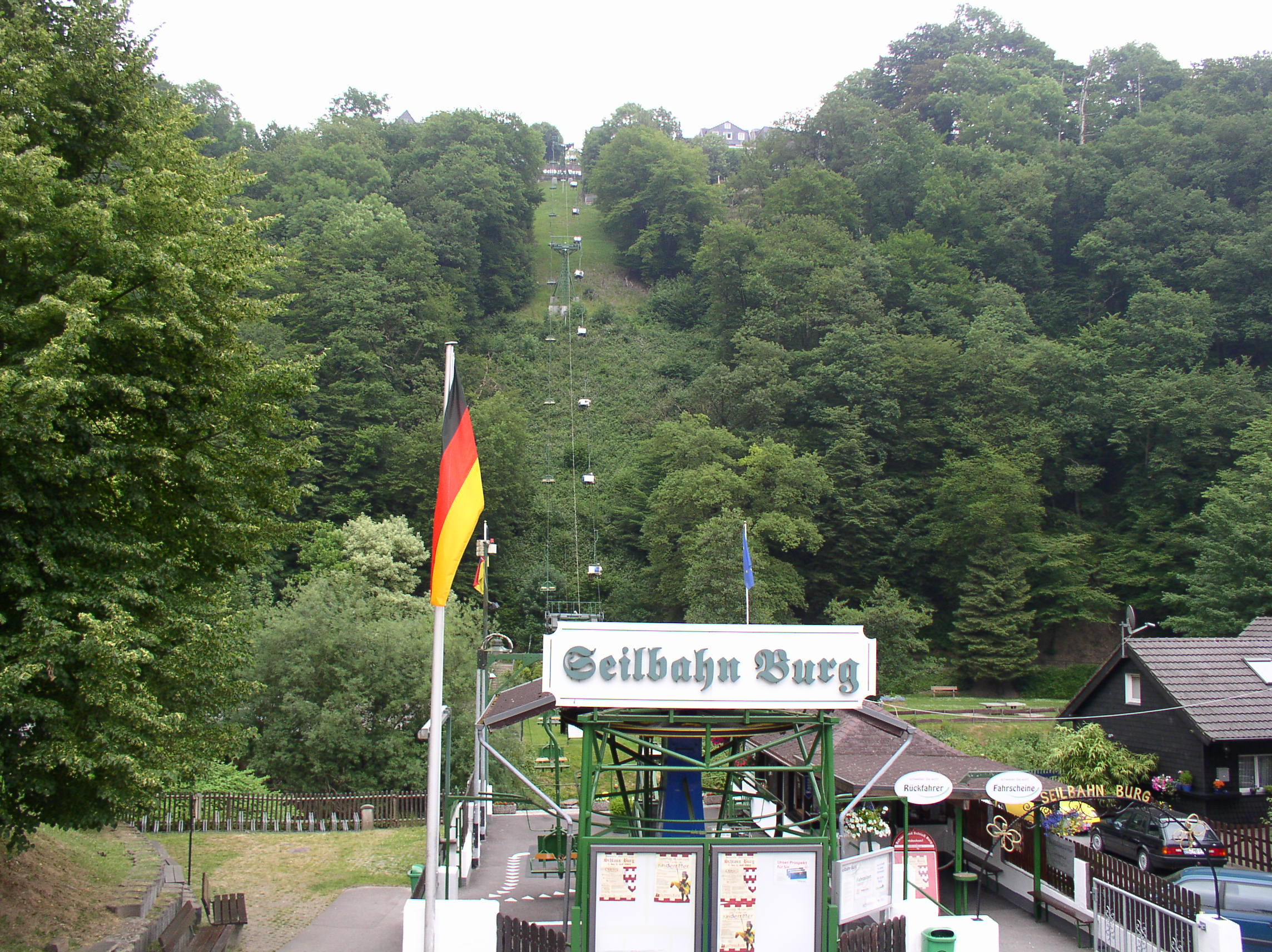
Zugang mit Blick nach oben

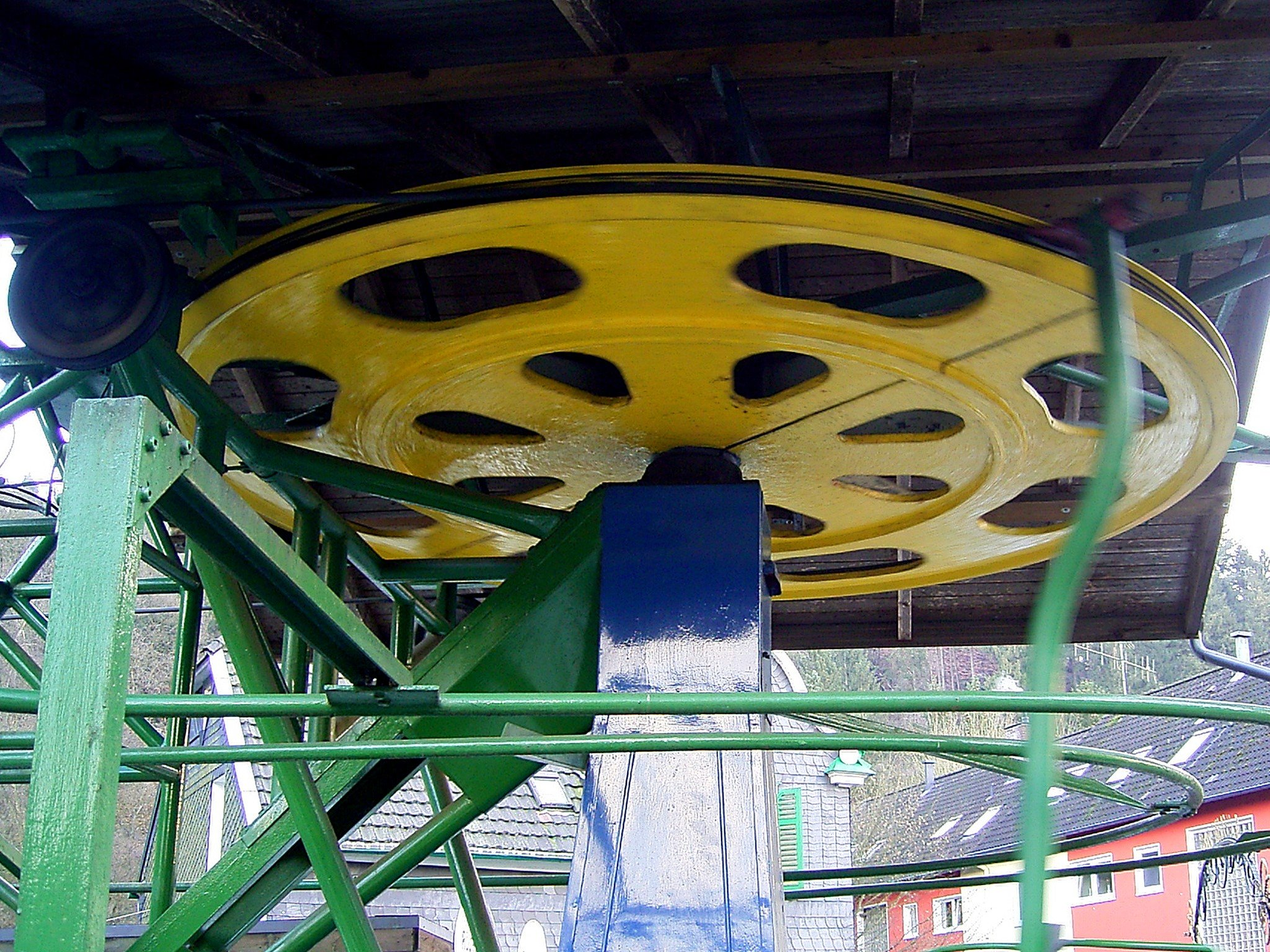
Umlenkscheibe in der Talstation

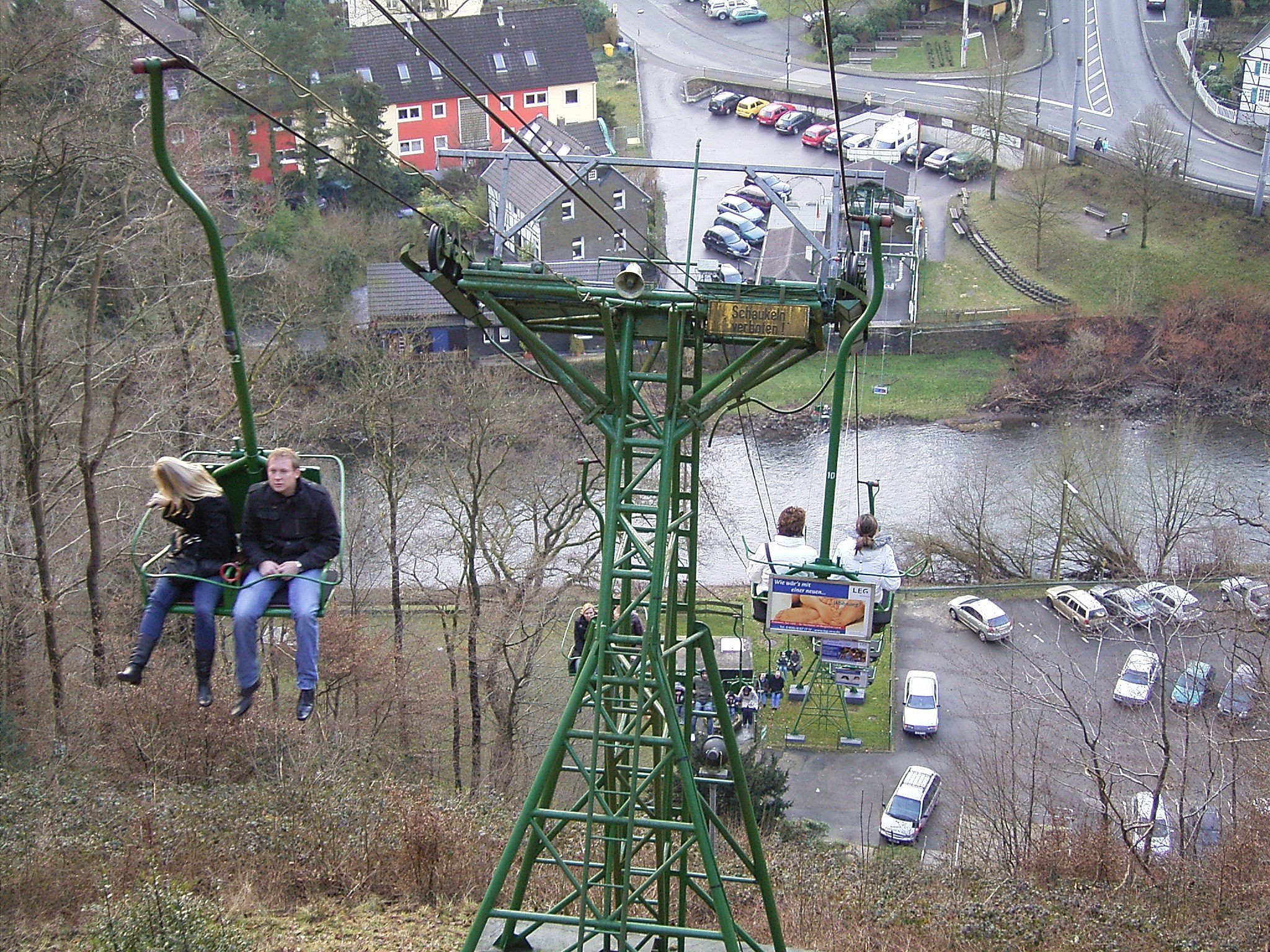
Blick zur Talstation

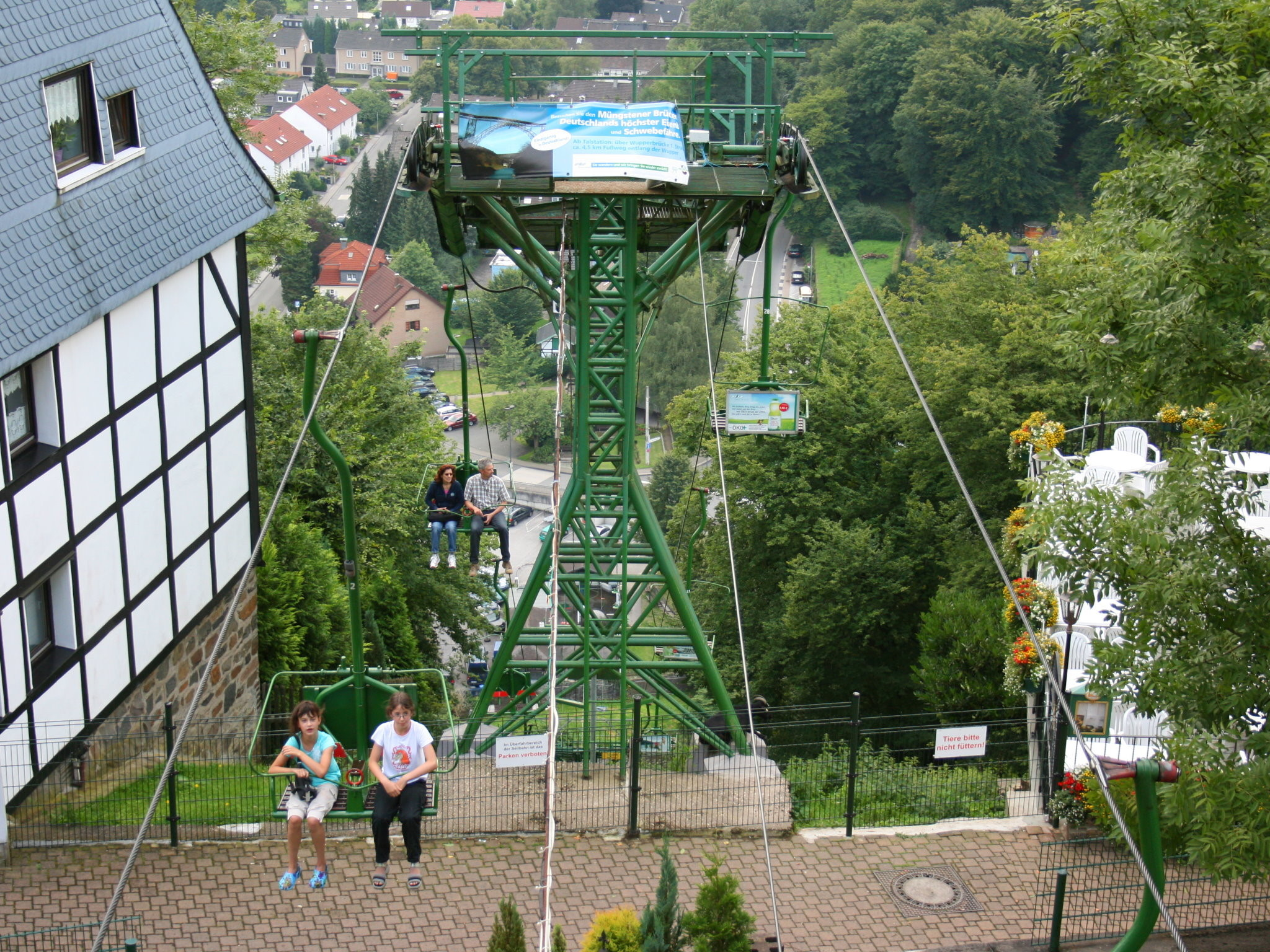
oberer Abschnitt

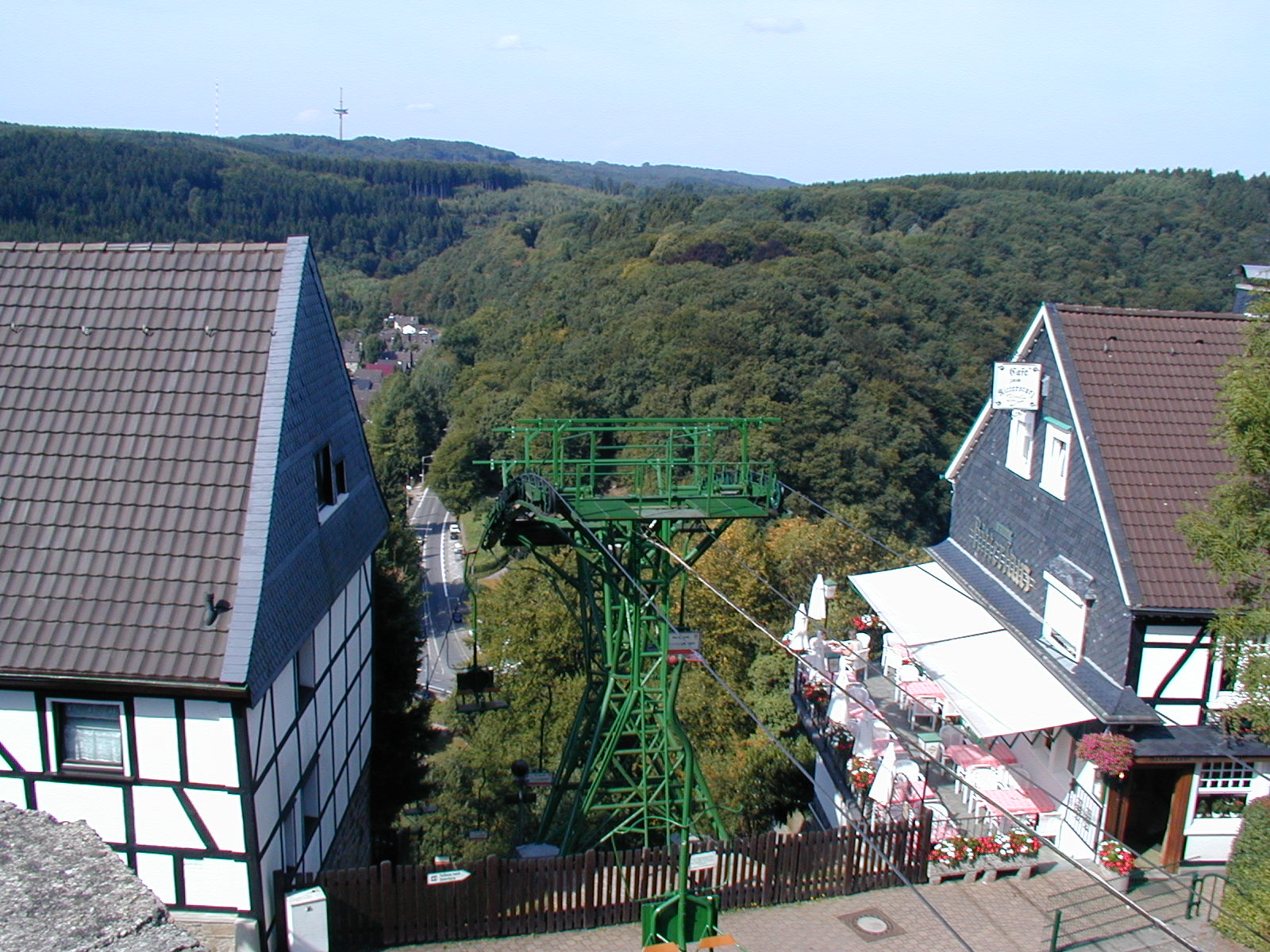
nahe Bergstation

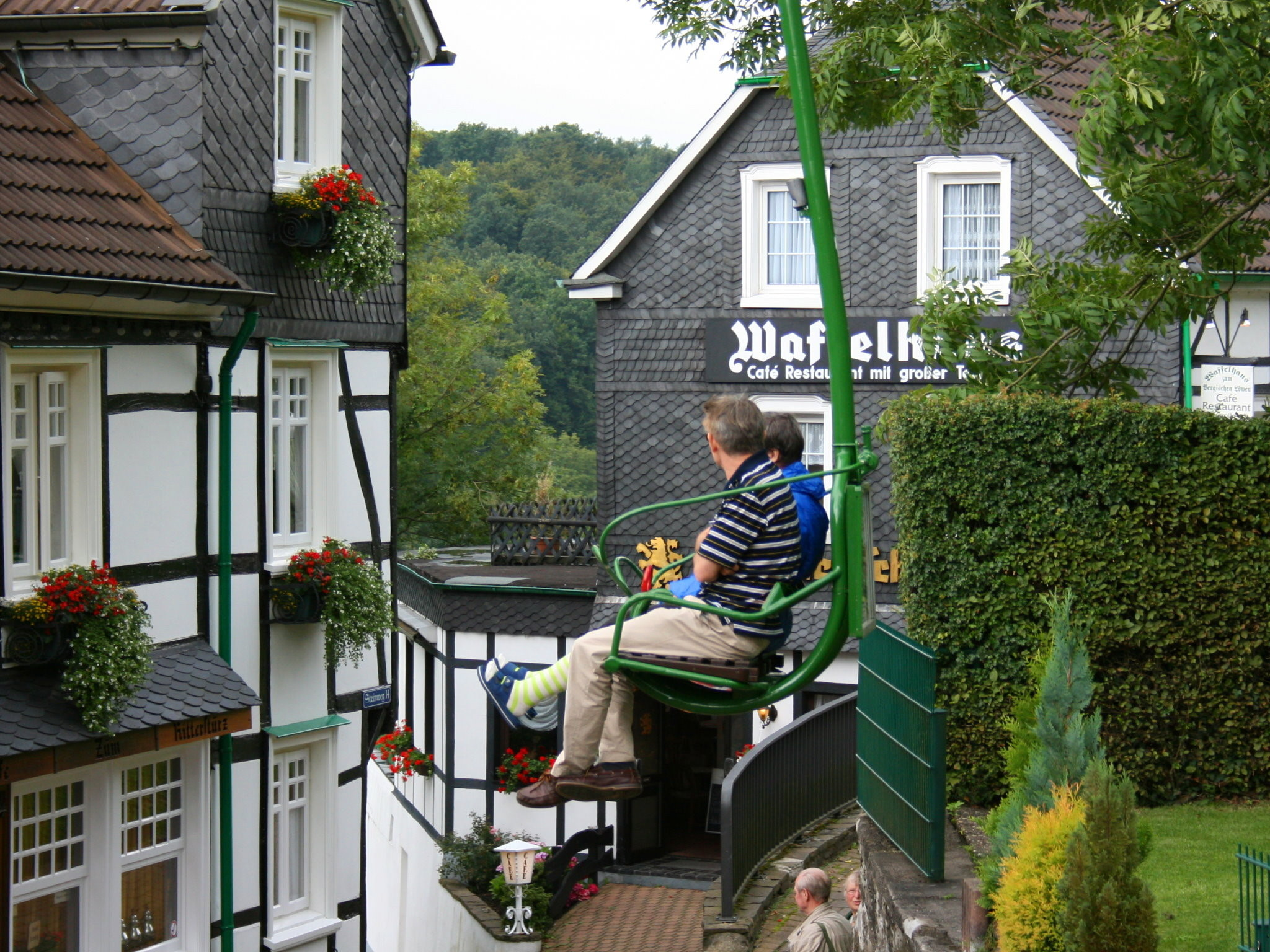
Zwischenausblicke

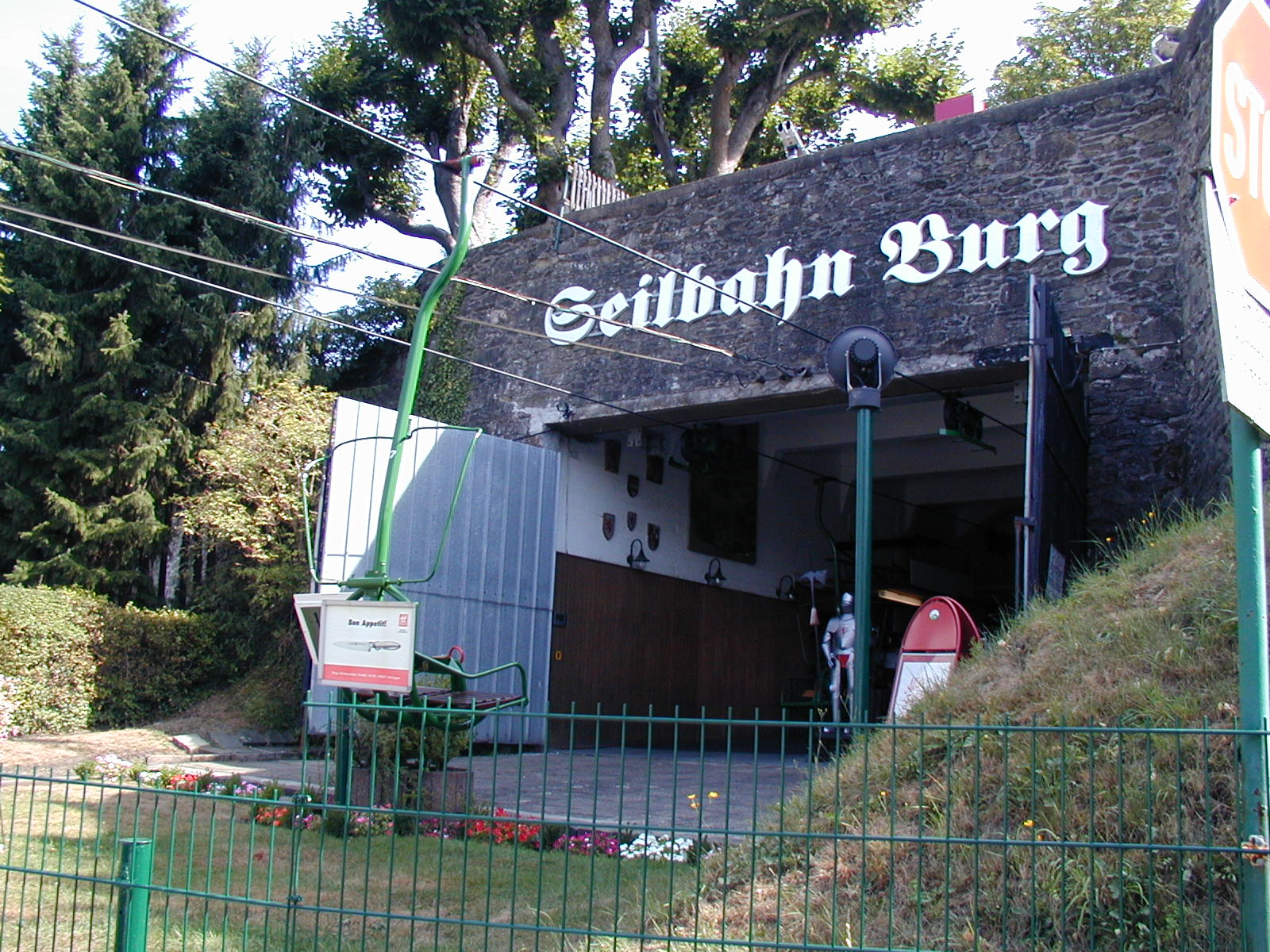
Bergstation mit Antrieb

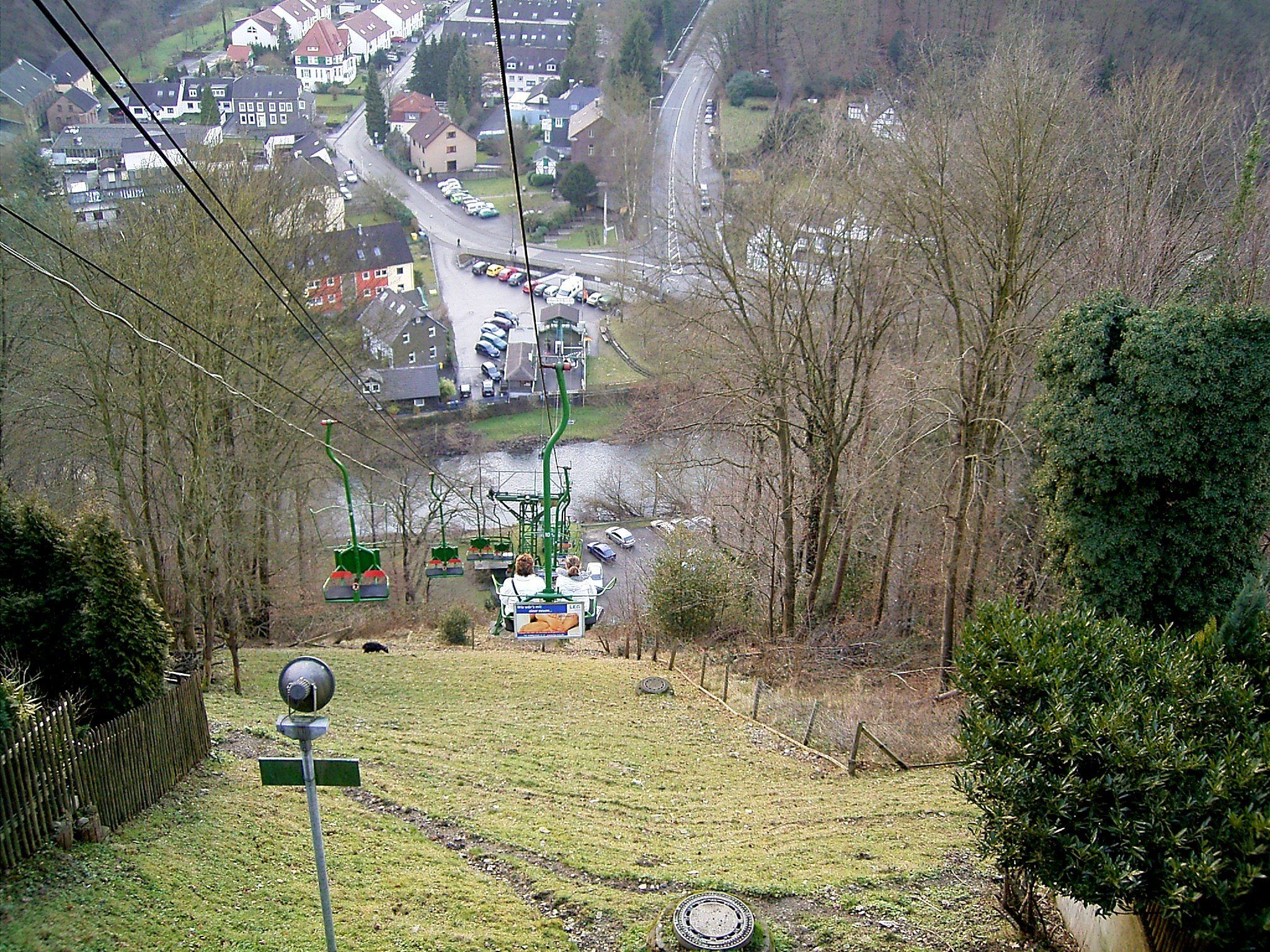
wieder nach unten

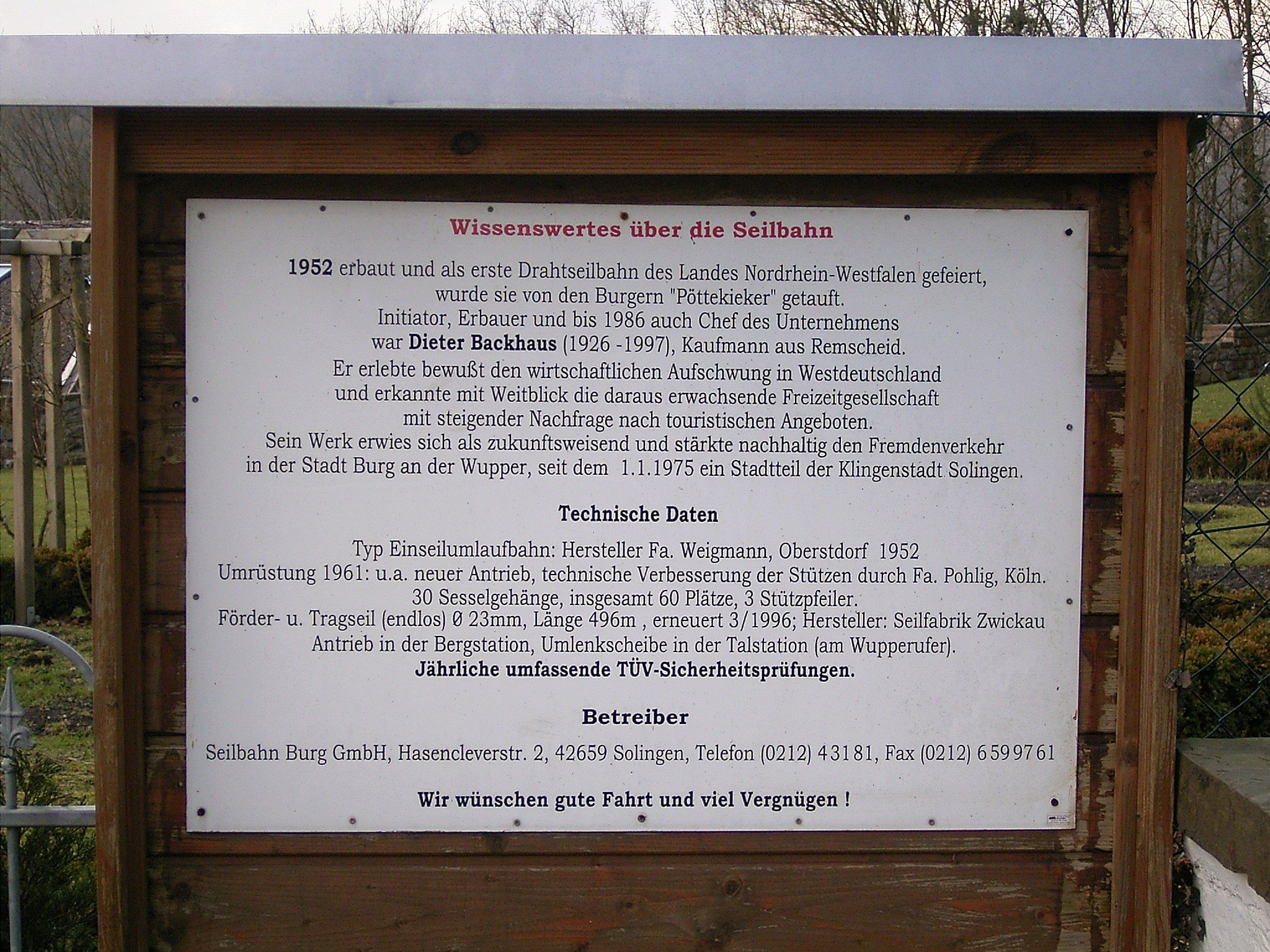
Informationstafel

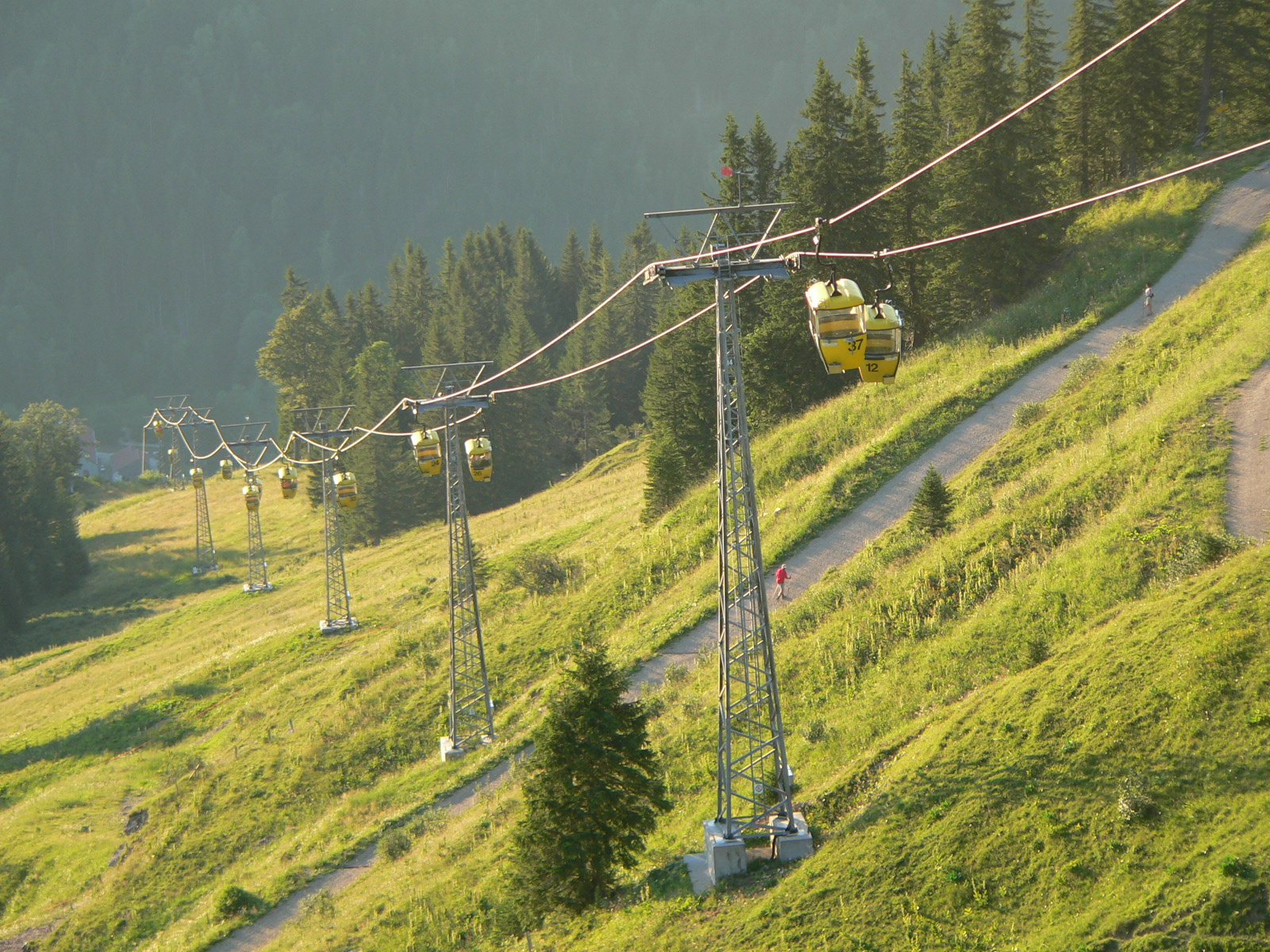
Hochgratbahn by Steibis

Under his leadership, the Koblatlift, the first chairlift in the Nebelhorn at Oberstdorf in the Allgäu Alps, was constructed. It was replaced in 1996 by a four-CLF (Leitner) four-chair lift.

=== Karwendelbahn and Lawinensprengbahn ===
In 1967, Wilfer went for a second project starting with the support pendulum at the cableway of Mittenwald in the Karwendelkar below the Western Karwendelspitze in operation (the so-called Karwendelbahn). They opened up the famous Dammkar ski area Mittenwald. He then worked as a manager at the Karwendelbahn.

During this time, he constructed his most spectacular project, a funicular railway for avalanches in the Dammkar ski area, which he also designed and built. The splitting kits were attached to the track and then dropped over the affected area. Since the existence of the Lawinenspreng cableway, no one had to go to endangered areas in order to control any avalanches. The method also had advantages over the helicopter deployment method that was emerging at the time. This was once their service in any weather, however, their explosions were carried out above the snow cover, whereby much larger areas could be saved. However, at the time, the concept was not popular; The project only came into fruition after a Labour Inspectorate from Munich was convinced of Wilfer's idea.

Only years later was Wilfer honored for his invention and was given the Order of Merit of the Federal Republic of Germany and the Bavarian State Medal in 1983.

=== Hochgratbahn ===
From 1970 to 1971, Wilfer was involved with the construction of the Hochgratbahn as a designer. Subsequently, he spent 23 years there until his retirement as the manager of the company.

== Publications ==
- Ernst Wilfer: Die neue Karwendelbahn in Mittenwald, Artikel in der Zeitschrift Verkehr und Technik, 1966, Heft 1
