= Jaap Leemhuis =

Dutch field hockey player

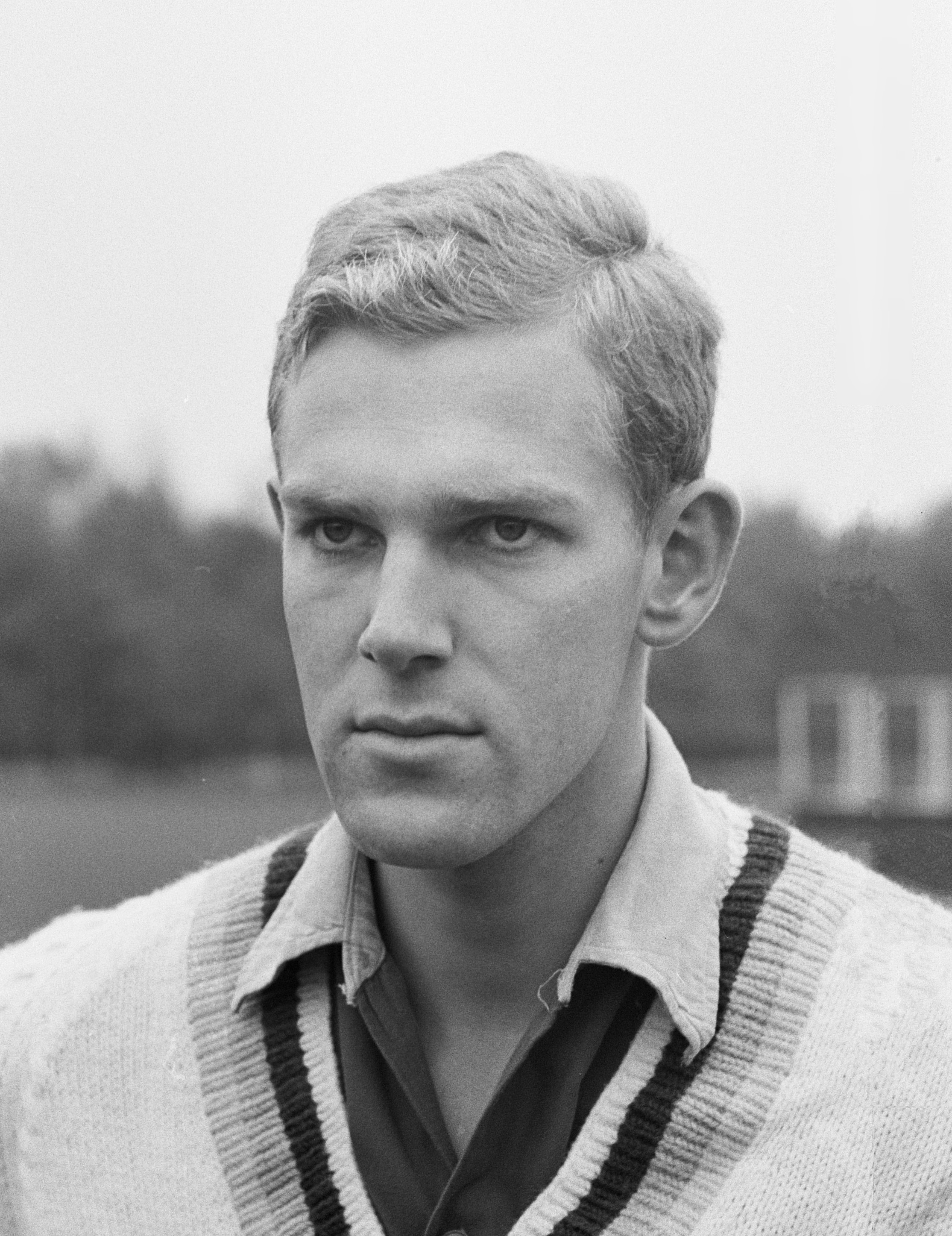
- Jaap Leemhuis in 1963

Personal information
- Born: 4 December 1941 Bilthoven, the Netherlands
- Died: 19 September 2014 The Hague, the Netherlands
- Height: 1.90 m (6 ft 3 in)
- Weight: 80 kg (180 lb)

Sport
- Sport: Field hockey
- Club: SCHC, Bilthoven

Jacob Pieter "Jaap" Leemhuis (4 December 1941 – 19 September 2014) was a field hockey player from the Netherlands. He competed at the 1960 and 1964 Summer Olympics, where his team finished in ninth and seventh place, respectively. He played 61 international matches before retiring in 1964. After that he worked for Shell, mostly outside the Netherlands. He was the chair of Haren en Snaren, an organization that helps young classical musicians from Eastern Europe.
