= Joseph B. Raynor Jr. =

American politician

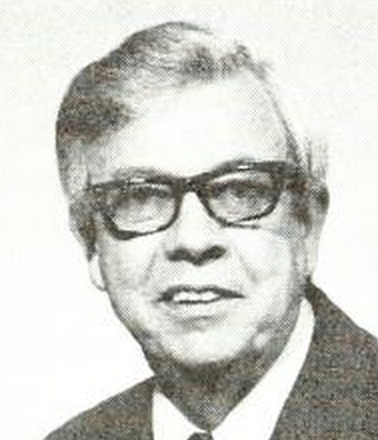

Member of the North Carolina Senate from the 10th district
- In office 1965–1992

Personal details
- Born: January 26, 1923 Cumberland County, North Carolina
- Died: September 4, 2014 (aged 91) Fayetteville, North Carolina
- Party: Democratic
- Spouse: Mildred Horne

Joseph Bryant "Joe" Raynor Jr. (January 26, 1923 – September 4, 2014) was a politician in the American state of North Carolina.

He was born in Cumberland County, North Carolina in 1923. After graduating high school, he opened up an automotive supply business. He was elected to the North Carolina House of Representatives in the 1960s and served eight consecutive terms.

He was elected to the North Carolina State Senate in to represent the tenth district. He retired in 1992.

He wed Mildred Horne in 1944 and lived in Fayetteville, North Carolina until his death in 2014.
