= Kazusuke Ogawa =

Japanese literary critic (1930–2014)

Kazusuke Ogawa (小川和佑, Ogawa Kazusuke, 29 April 1930 – 20 September 2014) was a Japanese literary critic.

Ogawa was born in Tokyo, and graduated from Meiji University's Literature Department in 1951. Having Shin'ichirō Nakamura as his mentor, he began writing poetry and literary criticism, and after a stint as a high school teacher in Tochigi Prefecture, he became an assistant professor at Showa Women's University. After retiring, he also worked as a lecturer at his alma mater and at Tokyo Denki University. After 1990 many of his writings centered on cherry blossoms.

He died on 20 September 2014 of stomach cancer.

== Works (selection) ==
- "Shiki" to sono shijin, 1970
- Miyoshi Tatsuji kenkyū, 1970
- Shōwa jojōshi kenkyū : Tachihara Michizō kōshō to giron, 1971
- Miyoshi Tatsuji no sekai, 1972
- Itō Shizuo ron, 1973
- Shōwa bungaku ron kō, 1975
- Takahashi Kazumi kenkyū, 1976
- Tachihara Michizō kenkyū, 1977
- Gendaishi dochaku to genshitsu, 1976
- Ritoru magajin hakkutsu : bungakushi no suiheisen, 1976
- Shōwa bungaku no ichisokumen : shiteki kyōensha no bungaku, 1977
- Tachihara Michizō ai no tegami : bungaku arubamu, 1978
- Karuizawa : bundan shiryō, 1980
- Itō Shizuo : kokō no jojō shijin, 1980
- Bunmei kaika no shi, 1980
- Bungakuhi no aru fūkei : shi no kokoro shi no fūdo, 1983
- Hori Tatsuo sono ai to shi, 1984
- Mishima Yukio : han "Nihon rōmanha" ron, 1985
- Hori Tatsuo : sakka no kyōgai, 1986
- Sakura no bungakushi, 1991
- Shōka, sanbika, gunka no shigen, 2005
- Sakura to Nihon bunka : seimeibi kara sange no hana e, 2007
