= Jim Eley =

Australian rules footballer

Personal information
- Full name: Jim Eley
- Born: 5 November 1932
- Died: 28 September 2014 (aged 81)
- Original team: Caulfield District
- Height: 185 cm (6 ft 1 in)
- Weight: 86 kg (190 lb)

Playing career^{1}
Years	Club	Games (Goals)
1953	St Kilda	4 (0)
- ^{1} Playing statistics correct to the end of 1953.

Jim Eley (5 November 1932 – 28 September 2014) was an Australian rules footballer who played with St Kilda in the Victorian Football League (VFL).
