= Ren Runhou =

Chinese business executive and politician

- 任润厚

Vice-Governor of Shanxi
- In office January 2011 – September 2014
- Governor: Li Xiaopeng

President of Lu'an Group
- In office June 2000 – June 2011

Personal details
- Born: October 1957 Dai County, Shanxi, China
- Died: September 30, 2014 (aged 56) China
- Party: Chinese Communist Party (expelled posthumously)
- Education: Tianjin University; China University of Mining and Technology

Chinese name
- Simplified Chinese: 任润厚
- Traditional Chinese: 任潤厚
Transcriptions
Standard Mandarin
- Hanyu Pinyin: Rén Rùnhoù

Ren Runhou (October 1957 – September 30, 2014) was a Chinese business executive and politician from Shanxi Province. He was the chief executive of Lu'an Group, a state-owned coal production company based in Shanxi, for over ten years beginning in June 2000. He became the Vice Governor of Shanxi in January 2011.

He was investigated by the Chinese Communist Party's internal disciplinary body in 2014, joining many officials from Shanxi who were dismissed from their posts amid corruption investigations. He died from cancer in September before a verdict had been reached on his case.

== Life ==
Ren Runhou was born and raised in Dai County, Shanxi. He earned an MBA degree from Tianjin University and D.E. degree from China University of Mining and Technology.

Ren got involved in politics in November 1979 and joined the Chinese Communist Party in October 1986.

Beginning in 1979, he served in several posts in Shanxi Xishan Mining Bureau (Chinese: 山西西山矿务局), including worker, secretary, engineer, and mine manager.

In September 1998 he became the vice-president of Shanxi Institute of Energy, a position he held until June 2000, when he was transferred to Changzhi as the president of Lu'an Group (Chinese: 潞安集团).

In January 2011 he was appointed as the vice-governor of Shanxi.

On August 29, 2014, Ren Runhou was being investigated by the Central Commission for Discipline Inspection for "serious violations of laws and regulations". Ren succumbed to cancer in September 2014, before a verdict had been reached on his case, but the investigation into his misconduct continued. On April 13, 2015, the CCDI announced the results of the investigation into Ren. The agency said that Ren took and gave bribes, took cash gifts, and embezzled public funds. The CCDI then posthumously expelled Ren from the Chinese Communist Party.
