= David Osler (architect) =

American architect

David Osler (January 9, 1921 – September 8, 2014) was an architect from Ann Arbor, Michigan.

== Early life and education ==
David W. Osler was born on January 9, 1921, in Ann Arbor, Michigan. He had one sister, Priscilla. He attended University High School (which matriculated its final students in 1968), where he met his eventual wife, Connie Lorch, the daughter of Emil Lorch, who was founder and dean of the U-M's School of Architecture from 1906 until 1939.

He graduated from the University of Michigan in 1942, after studying design and illustration. He played on the golf team.

After college, Osler enlisted in the Navy and served on the USS Thomas Jefferson. He commanded 15 landing craft, transporting troops of the 116th regiment, 29th division during the first wave of the assault on Omaha Beach.

== Career ==
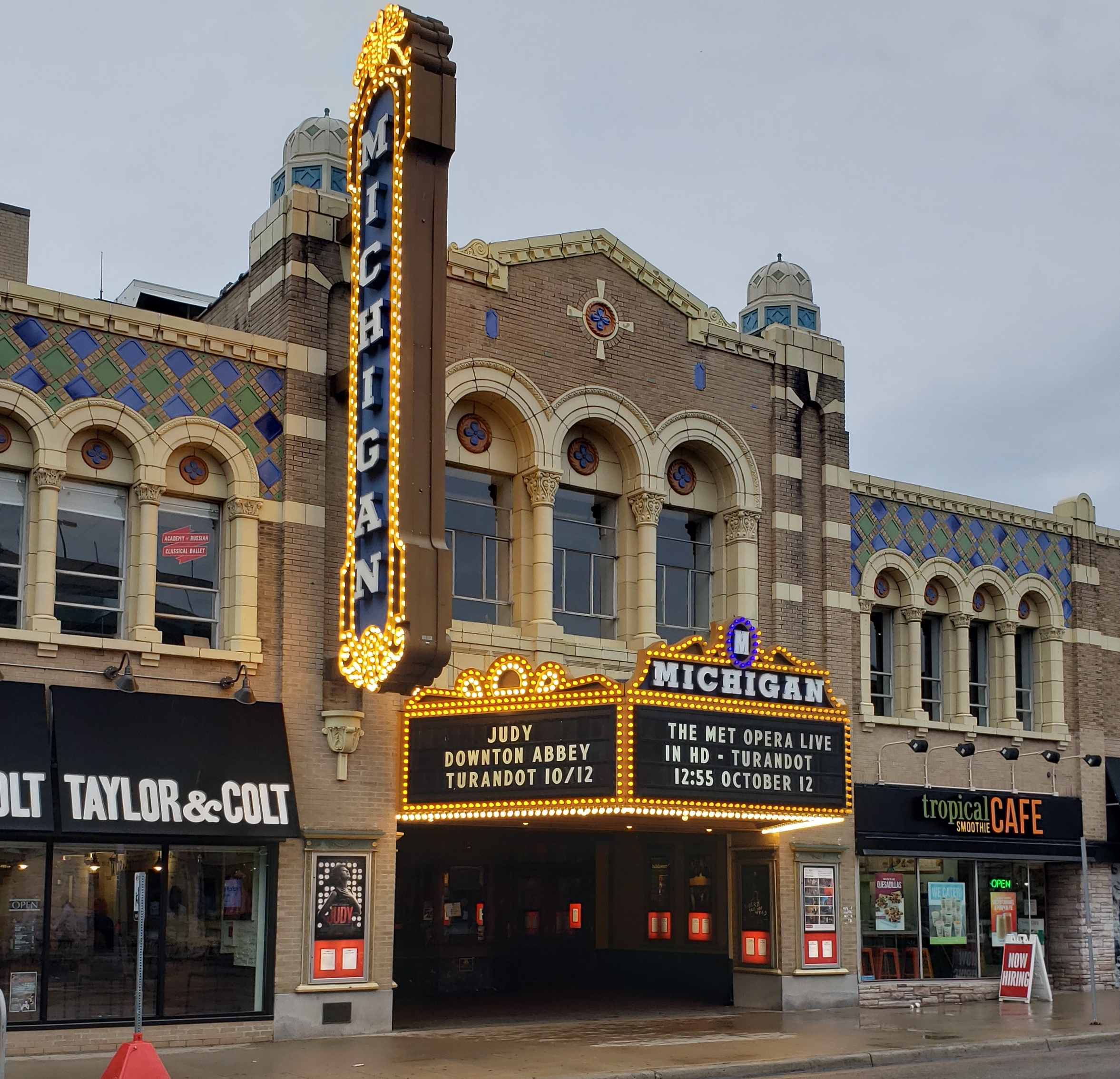
The Michigan Theatre (in Ann Arbor), pictured in 2009. Osler was involved in its restoration.

After returning from the war, he decided to pursue a career in architecture. He first worked for architect Douglas Loree, then founded David W. Osler Associates in 1958.

Though he started out designing residential architecture, he became best known for his large commercial, institutional, municipal, and condominium projects. He described his style as "elegant conservative," and said he was aiming for "[s]implicity, cohesiveness, and a practical interpretation of emotions between the natural setting and the structure."

Projects in Ann Arbor included St. Clare of Assisi Episcopal Church, the canoe livery at Gallup Park, and additions to the Ann Arbor District Library. He was also involved in the restoration of the Michigan Theater.

Osler also received an honorable mention in the finals for designing the Vietnam Veterans Memorial in Washington, D.C.

== Later life ==
In 1996 Osler was awarded the Michigan Gold Medal, the highest honor of the American Institute of Architects.

From December 20, 2013, to March 31, 2014, the University of Michigan Museum of Art displayed many of Osler's drawings in an exhibition called Three Michigan Architects: Part 1–David Osler. It was curated by Joseph Rosa, director of UMMA at the time, and Nancy Bartlett from the U-M Bentley Historical Library, where his papers are archived.

He retired in 2008, and died peacefully in 2014, at his home in Ann Arbor.
