= Don Wollett =

American professor, baseball salary arbitrator and author (1919–2014)

Donald Howard Wollett (July 5, 1919 – September 23, 2014) was an American professor, baseball salary arbitrator, and author.

== Personal life ==
He was born in Muscatine, Iowa and died in Freeland, Washington. He attended Bradley University, the University of Chicago. He graduated from Indiana University School of Law in 1942. He served in the United States Navy during World War II and became a lieutenant.

== Professional life ==
Starting in the 1940s, he worked for the University of Washington. In 1959, he took a position to work at the New York School of Law. From 1978 to 1990, he taught at the McGeorge School of Law. He also worked at Louisiana State University, UC Davis School of Law and Harvard Law School.

Wollett wrote and contributed to many books. With co-author Benjamin Aaron in 1960, he published Labor Relations and the Law. Wollett wrote the 2008 book Getting on Base: Unionism in Baseball and the 2013 book Dog Law (with Susan Crowell).

He was considered "he only person left who’s pushing for a minor-league union" in 2012. He made the headlines later in life after publicly criticizing the Department of Veterans Affairs for rejecting him a pension for his service during World War II.
