= Wilbur Waldo Mayhew =

American biologist (1920–2014)

Wilbur Waldo Mayhew, also known as Bill Waldo Mayhew (March 17, 1920 - September 19, 2014), was an American biologist and founding faculty member of the University of California, Riverside's biology department where he worked from 1954 until his retirement in 1989.

== Early life and education ==
Mayhew was born near Yoder, Colorado, on March 17, 1920. In 1921, Mayhew's family moved from Colorado to Stockton, California. In 1940, Mayhew joined the United States Army Air Corps. During World War II, Mayhew was involved in missions in Asia and North Africa until his plane was shot down over Sicily and crashed on Malta in 1943. Following World War II, Mayhew studied zoology at the University of California, Berkeley, receiving an A.B. in 1948, an M.A. in 1951, and finally a Ph.D. in 1953 under the supervision of A. Starker Leopold.

== Research and career ==
Mayhew's research focused on California wildlife, with special interest in reptiles. Mayhew was initially hired as an instructor to teach parasitology and later various courses in vertebrate biology. He published studies on lizards of the genera Sceloporus and Uma, among other taxa. He was tenured as an associate professor at UCR in 1969.

== Conservation and activism ==
Mayhew soon grew concerned about the disappearance of wild lands during the post-war California growth spurt. He used any opportunity to protect land for research and teaching. In 1958, he encouraged Philip Boyd to donate some land that later became the Boyd Deep Canyon Reserve, and in 1963 he obtained 160 acres of land from the Bureau of Land Management in the Box Springs Mountains. Mayhew said that he "could do biology much more good by going out and saving land for other people [than to publish] two or three more papers […] So, when I finally got my [associate] professorship [with tenure] in 1969, from then on is when I really went after land." Bill served as director of the UCR-administered reserves from 1969 to 1990, searching out properties, evaluating them, and identifying prospective donors throughout his tenure. Through his efforts Riverside, the smallest of the UC campuses, administered more reserves than any other campus when he retired.
