= Shankar Vaidya =

- Born: 15 June 1928; Otur, India
- Died: 23 September 2014 (aged 86); Mumbai, Maharashtra
- Known for: Marathi poetry

Shankar Vaidya (15 June 1928 – 23 September 2014) was a Marathi poet and writer from Maharashtra, India. He was married to writer Sarojini Vaidya. He died on 23 September 2014 in Mumbai.

== Career ==
Vaidya was a Marathi poet known for his easy flowing poems. He was also known for his deep study of poetry covering Marathi poets going back to the 19th century and even earlier to 13th century poets like Sant (Saint) Dnyaneshwar. His first collection of poems (Kavya Sangrah) ‘Kalaswar’ (rough translation: Melody of Time) was published in 1971. However, his first book ‘Aala Kshan Gela Kshan’ (rough translation: Impending instants in time, instants passed by in time) was a collection of short stories published in the early 1960s. Despite being a prolific writer, his second collection of poems 'Darshan' (rough translation: vision) was published only after a long interval in 1998. Many of his poems were published in various periodicals, especially the specials published during the festival of Diwali but were never collected in anthologies.

He was honoured with many awards.

A number of songs written by Shankar Vaidya became very popular, with "Swargangechya Kathavarti" (sung by Arun Date) leading the list. Other well known songs include, "Shatakanchya Yadnyatuna Uthali Ek Keshari Jwala" (sung by Lata Mangeshkar) and "Valawantatuna Chalale Jeevan" (sung by Yashwant Deo). His collaboration 'Mogara Phulala' with Pandit Hridaynath Mangeshkar, Lata Mangeshkar and Asha Bhosale on the works of Sant. Dnyaneshwar, his sister Muktabai, and brother Nivruttinath presented a blend of poetry and musicianship. The program had hundreds of stagings across Maharashtra and Marathi television.

== Works ==
1. Aala kshan gela kshan (आला क्षण गेला क्षण' पहिला कथासंग्रह)
2. Kalaswar (कालस्वर' पहिला काव्यसंग्रह)
3. Darshan (दर्शन काव्यसंग्रह)

== Songs ==
- Swargangechya Kathavarti (स्वरगंगेच्या काठावरती)
- Aaj Hriday Mam (आज हृदय मम)
- Rimjhim (रिमझिम)
- Valavantatun Bheeshan (वाळवंटांतून भीषण)
- Shatakanchya Yadnyatun (शतकांच्या यज्ञातुन)

== Death ==
Vaidya died on 23 September 2014 in Dadar.
