= Mara Neusel =

Mathematician

Mara Dicle Neusel
- Born: May 14, 1964; Stuttgart, Germany
- Died: September 5, 2014 (aged 50)
- Education: University of Göttingen
- Known for: Invariant Theory
- Scientific career
- Thesis: Konfigurationen von Geraden und einer Quadrik mit Baumauflösungen (Configurations of straight line and a quadric with tree resolutions) (1992)
- Doctoral advisor: Tammo tom Dieck

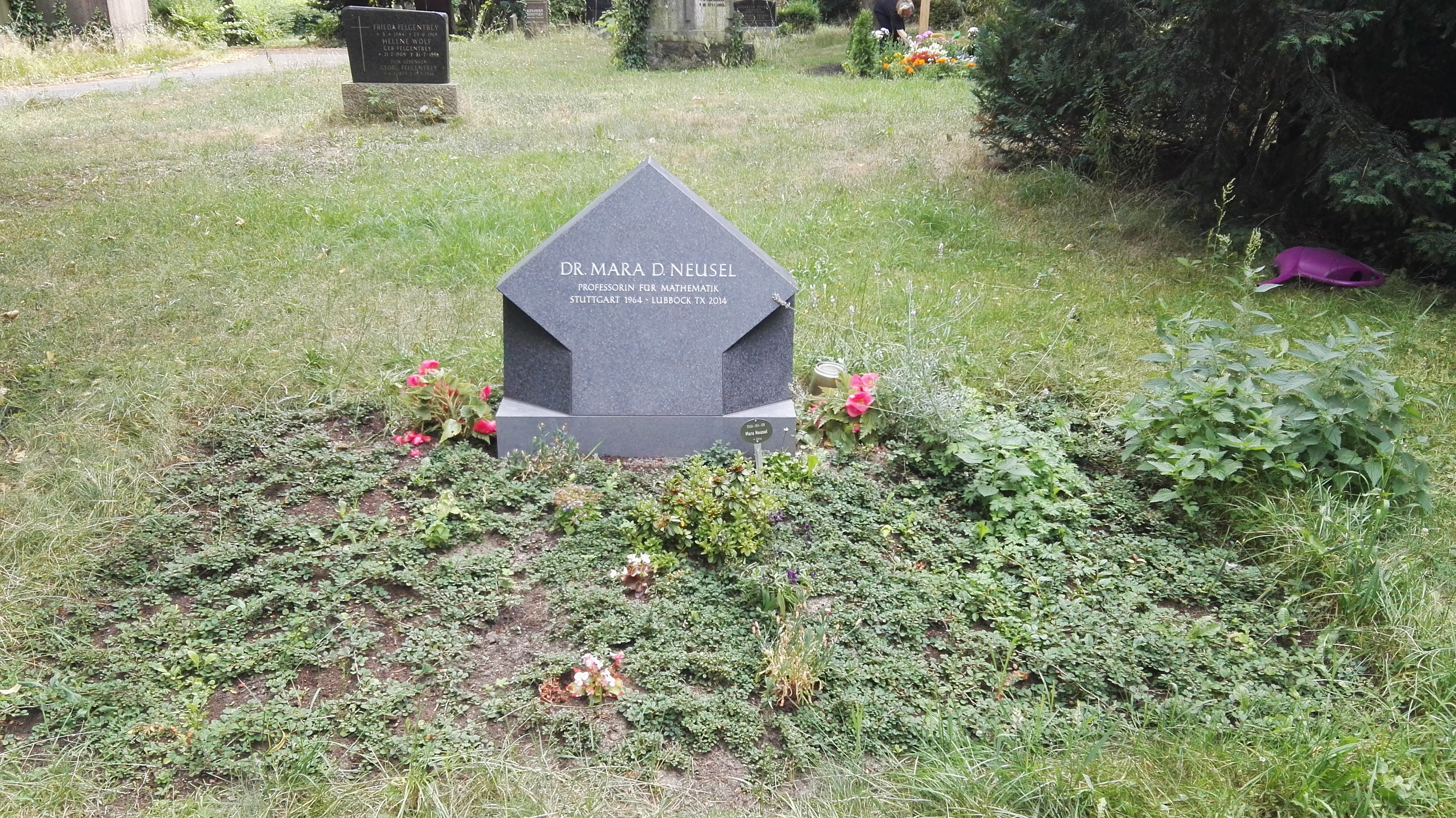
Grave of Mara Neusel in Berlin

Mara Dicle Neusel (May 14, 1964 – September 5, 2014) was a mathematician, author, teacher and an advocate for women in mathematics. The focus of her mathematical work was on invariant theory, which can be briefly described as the study of group actions and their fixed points.

== Life and education ==
Mara Neusel was born in Stuttgart, Germany, one of two children of Günter and Aylâ (Helvacioglu) Neusel. In 2001 she became the fourth woman to earn the advanced degree venia legendi (Habilitation) in mathematics from the University of Göttingen, following in the footsteps of the first woman mathematician to be awarded the venia legend from Göttingen in 1919, Emmy Noether.

== Career ==
Professor Neusel was the author of a research monograph, an advanced undergraduate text, and a memoir for the American Mathematical Society: Invariant Theory and Finite Groups, Invariant Theory, and Inverse Invariant Theory and Steenrod Operations. The exposition in the text Invariant Theory "stands out by its masterly clarity, comprehensiveness, profundity, and didactical disposition." Neusel served on the editorial boards of Advances in Pure Mathematics and the International Journal of Mathematics and Applied Statistics. A tireless advocate for girls and women in mathematics, Neusel established Emmy Noether High School Mathematics Days in May 2003 which continues to be celebrated with workshops and mathematical competitions. She co-founded the Young Women in Mathematics group at Texas Tech and received a diversity grant to support the group.

Neusel began her career at Texas Tech University in 2002 as an associate professor and was promoted to full professor in 2009. She also held visiting appointments at Yale University, the University of Minnesota, and the University of Notre Dame.

Professor Neusel had long term memberships in the American Mathematical Society and the Association for Women in Mathematics. Neusel co-organized a special session on "Homological Algebra and Its Applications" at the 2005 Meeting of the American Mathematical Society in Lubbock, Texas as well as a special session on "Commutative Algebra and Algebraic Geometry" at the 40th Anniversary Celebration of the Association for Women in Mathematics at Brown University in 2011.
