= Kevin O'Neill (cricketer) =

Australian cricketer

Personal information
- Born: 16 August 1919; Hectorville, Australia
- Died: 8 September 2014 (aged 95)
- Source: Cricinfo, 18 September 2020

Kevin O'Neill (16 August 1919 – 8 September 2014) was an Australian cricketer. He played in eighteen first-class matches for South Australia between 1946 and 1950.

== See also ==
- List of South Australian representative cricketers
