= Lou Curtis =

Australian cricketer

Personal information
- Full name: Louis David Curtis
- Born: 5 August 1928; Loxton, South Australia
- Died: 27 September 2014 (aged 86); Loxton, South Australia
- Source: Cricinfo, 11 April 2016

Lou Curtis (5 August 1928 – 27 September 2014) was an Australian cricketer. He played one first-class match for South Australia in 1950/51.

== See also ==
- List of South Australian representative cricketers
