= Erich Bloch (economist) =

Zimbabwean advisor and journalist

- Born: April 2, 1939; Johannesburg, South Africa
- Died: September 20, 2014 (aged 75); Bulawayo, Zimbabwe
- Occupation: Chartered accountant

Erich Bloch, also Eric Bloch, (April 2, 1939 – September 20, 2014) was an advisor to the Reserve Bank of Zimbabwe and a newspaper columnist.

Erich Bloch was born on April 2, 1939, in Johannesburg, South Africa, to Hans Bloch and his wife Friedel. The family migrated to Bulawayo, Zimbabwe when Bloch was a child. The Blochs originated in Hamburg and had a strong German heritage. After Hitler came to power in 1933, many Jews left Germany and settled in various parts of the world. Hans Bloch, Erich's father, moved his family to South Africa. In 1951, Hans Bloch was invited to join a firm of accountants and consultants in Bulawayo. Erich's mother came from a Lithuanian family forced to move to South Africa after the 19th century pogroms.

Bloch attended Milton Boys Junior and then went on to Milton Boys' High. A chartered accountant by profession, he was a regular Zimbabwe Independent newspaper columnist who spent most of his life analyzing Zimbabwe's complex economic and political challenges.

Bloch was chairman of the advisory board of the National University of Science and Technology (NUST) Faculty of Architecture and Quantity Surveying, and a member of the Industrial Advisory Board of the Faculty of Journalism and Media Studies.

A member of the Jewish Community in Bulawayo, Bloch and his wife Baileh were Orthodox Jews.
