= Michaela Andörfer =

Roman Catholic nun

Maria Michaela of the Blessed Trinity Maria Michaela von der Allerheiligsten Dreifaltigkeit
- Born: Michaela Christine Andörfer; 25 October 1928; Cottbus, Prussia, Germany
- Died: 26 September 2014; Berlin, Germany
- Occupation: religious sister

Sister Maria Michaela of the Blessed Trinity (born Michaela Christine Andörfer: 25 October 1928 – 26 September 2014) was a German Roman Catholic religious sister who served for many years as Superior general of the Sisters of Saint Hedwig (Hedwigschwestern).

== Life ==
Michaela Christine ("Christel") Andörfer, the third of her parents' seven recorded children, was born at Cottbus and grew up nearby Döbern, a small but long established town a short distance to the north of Germany's frontier with Czechoslovakia. The little town had carved itself a niche as a centre for the manufacture of cut-to size sheet glass used to protect the surfaces of valuable tables. The family was a traditional Catholic one. Michaela's father, who had originally immigrated from Bohemia, worked as table glass grinder, a trade into which his daughter followed him after leaving elementary school. When she was sixteen the war ended and the family found themselves living in the Soviet occupation zone. The Polish frontier was suddenly just a couple of hours walk to the east. The Andörfers were also involved in agriculture, and during the years of reconstruction and land reform that accompanied Soviet occupation, Christel Andörfer joined in the farming work, "driving a tractor, and able to handle horses, pigs and cows like no one else", according to a later interview with her ninety-six-year-old mother.

As she grew up she was familiar from as far back as her time in Kindergarten with the Sisters of Saint Hedwig who ran a branch in Döbern. The sisters were a religious congregation with a particular focus on support for children and adolescents suffering from cognitive, emotional or social impairments. In the words of a senior member of the order, Christel Andörfer experienced for herself "the selflessness, the willingness to provide hands-on help and the trust in God [on which the sisters prided themselves] during the war years and postwar period".

One day in 1949 she asked her family if they could imagine her becoming a religious sister. This was interpreted as a statement of intent, masquerading unconvincingly as a tactful question. On 13 June 1950 she was admitted as a postulant to the Sisters of Saint Hedwig's principal establishment at Berlin-Wannsee. She made her simple vows in 1957. After her novitiate she attended a music conservatory, learning both music and Montessori teaching methods. She also learned many of the craft skills which she would be able to apply to teaching mentally impaired children. Her inputs to the construction of the Sancta Maria Remedial Children's Home and of the school attached to it in Wannsee were decisive.

In 1969 Andörfer was elected Superior general of the Sisters of Hedwig. It was the first change at the top since before the Second World War, and she herself retained the post until 2005. Her predecessor, Sr. Augustina Schmidt, was by this time very old, and died only two years after Sr. Michaela's appointment.

In 1986, at the request of the Senate of Berlin, Andörfer took on the care of a group of HIV-positive babies and infants. At the time this was considered more noteworthy at the time than subsequently, because of the insecurities and reactions unleashed by any public discussion of HIV/AIDS.

After relinquishing her position as Superior general of the Sisters of Saint Hedwig in 2005, Andörfer assumed a new leadership role in 2011 when she took on the role of the Sisters of Saint Hedwig's superior for the Province of Germany.

== Public recognition ==
Andörfer was awarded the Order of Merit of the Federal Republic of Germany on 9 September 1998.
