= Philip Hough =

English cricketer

Personal information
- Full name: Philip Hough
- Born: 31 August 1924; Macclesfield, Cheshire, England
- Died: 4 September 2014 (aged 90); Chippenham, Wiltshire, England
- Batting: Right-handed
- Bowling: Leg break googly

Domestic team information
- Years: Team
- 1949–1959: Cheshire
- 1962–1966: Wiltshire

Career statistics
Competition	LA
Matches	1
Runs scored	25
Batting average	25.00
100s/50s	–/–
Top score	25
Balls bowled	–
Wickets	–
Bowling average	–
5 wickets in innings	–
10 wickets in match	–
Best bowling	–
Catches/stumpings	–/–
- Source: Cricinfo, 10 October 2010

Philip Hough (31 August 1924 – 4 September 2014) was an English cricketer. Hough was a right-handed batsman who bowled leg break googly. His birthplace was Macclesfield, Cheshire.

Hough made his Minor Counties Championship debut for Cheshire in 1949 against Staffordshire. From 1949 to 1959, he represented the Cheshire and the Lancashire Second XI in a combined total of 36 Minor Counties Championship matches, the last of which came against Northumberland.

In 1962, Savin joined Wiltshire, where he made his Minor Counties Championship debut for the county against Dorset. From 1962 to 1966, he represented the county in 12 Championship matches, the last of which came against Dorset.

Savin also represented Wiltshire in a single List-A match against Nottinghamshire in the 1965 Gillette Cup during which he scored 25 runs before being caught and bowled by Andrew Corran.

Hough later stood as an umpire in 25 Minor Counties Championship matches between 1967 and 1972.
