= San W. Orr Jr. =

American lawyer

San W. Orr. Jr.
- Born: September 22, 1941; Madison, Wisconsin, U.S.
- Died: September 30, 2014 (aged 73); Lake Tomahawk, Wisconsin, U.S.
- Occupation: Businessman
- Children: San W. Orr III

San W. Orr Jr. (September 22, 1941 – September 30, 2014) was an American businessman. He was the chief executive officer of the Wausau Paper Corporation from 1989 to 1990, 1994 to 1995, and chairman from 2000 to 2012.

== Biography ==
=== Early life ===
Orr was born in 1941. A native of Madison, he graduated from the University of Wisconsin–Madison in 1963, and received a J.D. from the University of Wisconsin Law School in 1966. He was an attorney and certified public accountant.

=== Career ===
He was vice-chairman of the Mosinee Paper Corporation from 1978 to 1987, and chairman from 1987 to 1997. From 1972, he was on the board of directors of the Wausau Paper Corporation. He was its chief executive officer from 1989 to 1990, 1994 to 1995, and 2000 to 2012. He was also on the boards of directors of MDU Resources, First American Bank, Wausau Insurance Companies and Marshall & Ilsley.

From 1987 to 1989, he chaired the Board of Visitors of the UW-Madison School of Business. He was also an officer and director of the Wisconsin Alumni Association.

He was appointed to the University of Wisconsin Board of Regents for a seven-year term by Governor Tommy Thompson in 1993. He was elected President of the Board in 1998.

In addition, Orr was a director of Competitive Wisconsin, Inc., the Wisconsin Taxpayers Alliance and the Leigh Yawkey Woodson Art Museum, Wausau.

He was a director of the University of Wisconsin Foundation, the Aytchmonde Woodson Foundation and the Nancy Woodson Spire Foundation. He was on the board of directors of the conservative Bradley Foundation. A Republican, he supported George W. Bush, Jim DeMint, Pete Coors, Rand Paul, the Club for Growth and the Free Enterprise Fund.

=== Personal life ===
Orr married Joanne Ruby on June 26, 1965. His son, San W. Orr III, received a J.D. degree from the University of Chicago Law School in 1997. Orr died on September 30, 2014, eight days after his 73rd birthday.
