= John King (painter) =

English painter (1929–2014)

John King or John Gregory King (16 April 1929 – 8 September 2014) was an English painter, considered a leading sporting artist of the post war era. His works stretched from military and ceremonial occasions, to horse and hound portraits, and hunting scenes.

== Early life ==
King was born in West Tytherley in Hampshire to Arthur Gregory King and Dorothy (née Greenman). They ran a farm on which John would occasionally work as he was growing up. It is said King showed an aptitude for drawing from a young age, sketching the horses on which he learned to ride and hunt. He was educated at Canford School in Dorset, and, with the encouragement of artist Lionel Edwards, a family friend, went on to study at Salisbury College of Art. King worked in water colours, oil, and pencil. He was also known to sculpt.

== Career ==
King rose to fame for his illustrations for the ‘Illustrated London News’ and ‘Horse and Hound’ Magazine. He often worked with former Horse and Hound Editor Michael Clayton, producing illustrations for Michael's weekly column “Foxford’s Hunting Diary”. In 1984 Clayton and King produced a book titled "The Golden Thread" which had illustrations of many hunts across the UK. King also illustrated books by Jim Meads, Robin Page and many others. King became a founding member of the Society of Equestrian Artists. He became known for the quote that hunting scenes are “90 per cent landscape”

== High-profile work and patrons ==
In later life King went on to exhibit with both the Royal Institute and the Society of Wildlife Artists. From 1966 onward he held at least ten 'one man exhibits' and many shared exhibits. His magnum opus was a commission for Sheikh Mohammed Al Maktoum, Vice-President of the UAE and Emir of Dubai, which comprised a 16 ft by 8 ft painting of 'Dubai Millennium', the Sheikh's racehorse and winner of the Queen Elizabeth II Stakes. The painting was considered to be the largest equestrian painting produced in the UK for at least 200 years. Other high-profile patrons included the Dukes of Beaufort and Northumberland, Household Cavalry, City of London Livery Companies and Tattersalls bloodstock auctioneers.
