= Ramón Rojas =

Ramón Rojas (c. 1979 – 20 September 2014) was a Chilean BASE jumper. On 21 August 2014, he broke the world record for the highest wingsuit ski base jump, when he made a 4,100-metre (13,500 ft) leap from Cerro El Plomo in the Andes. He died less than a month later while practicing in Lauterbrunnen, Switzerland at the age of 35.
