= Ray Lambrecht =

- Born: January 31, 1918
- Died: September 22, 2014 (aged 96); Pierce, Nebraska
- Occupation: Owned a Chevrolet car dealership
- Known for: Collecting old cars

Ray Lambrecht (January 31, 1918 – September 22, 2014) was an American car dealer in Pierce, Nebraska.

== Background ==
Lambrecht opened a Chevrolet dealership in 1946 following his return from serving with the United States Army during World War II. Over several decades, a large number of new/leftover cars and trucks as well as various trade-ins were parked unsold on his properties and eventually became largely hidden by growing trees. After 50 years in business, the dealership closed in 1996.

== Auction ==
In 2013, Lambrecht put more than 500 of his antique cars and memorabilia items up for auction. Most vehicles were from the 1950s, 1960s and 1970s with many having fewer than 15 miles on the odometer. The no-reserve auction was televised on the History Channel and it drew 25,000 people to Pierce for the two-day event. Bidders from around the world were also able to participate on the auction site Proxibid. The auction brought in approximately $2,800,000 in bids.
