= Edward R. Hauser =

American animal scientist

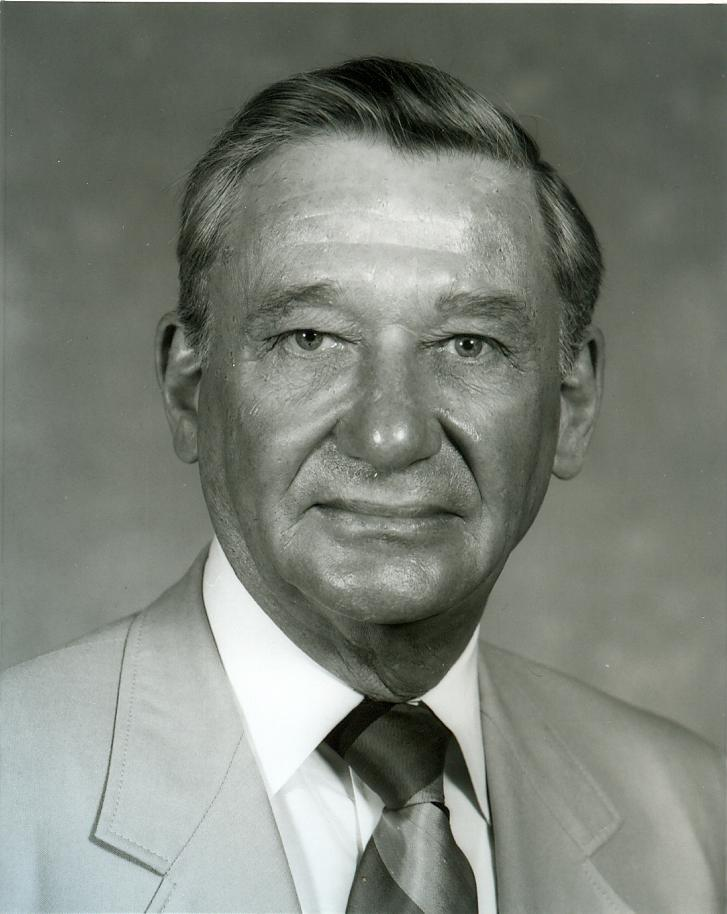
- Born: August 29, 1916; La Crosse, Wisconsin
- Died: September 8, 2014 (aged 98); Fitchburg, Wisconsin
- Education: University of Wisconsin–Madison
- Known for: reproductive physiology, beef cattle management
- Scientific career
- Fields: Animal Science
- Workplaces: University of Wisconsin–Madison, Clemson University
- Doctoral advisor: Gordon E. Dickerson

Edward R. Hauser (August 29, 1916 – September 8, 2014) was an American animal scientist who served as professor and chairman of the Department of Meat and Animal Science at University of Wisconsin–Madison.

== Birth and education ==
Edward R. Hauser was born on August 29, 1916, in La Crosse, Wisconsin. One of four children of Swiss immigrant parents from Wiedlisbach, Canton Bern, Switzerland, he left the family dairy to study at the University of Wisconsin–Madison where he received the BS in Animal Husbandry in 1938. He was a letterman on the 1936 wrestling team. He obtained the MS degree in Animal Science at Oklahoma A&M University in 1939 where he studied reproductive performance of sheep. He was then appointed assistant professor at Clemson College in South Carolina. In 1943 he joined the US Navy – serving in World War II as a Ltjg on the USS Chincoteague (AVP-24). He was a veteran of the battles of Peleliu, Iwo Jima and Okinawa. Near the end of WWII in 1945, he served as a peacekeeper in Shanghai China, helping the Chinese get the Japanese out of China. After the Navy, he returned to Clemson as an associate professor in 1946. In 1947 he began his PhD work at the University of Missouri in reproductive physiology studying genetic control of boar development under the supervision of Gordon Dickerson. In retirement, he enjoyed travel, reading, boating, socializing with relatives. and serving as a docent at the Swiss Historical Museum in New Glarus WI - a cause he donated money to.

== Career at Wisconsin ==
In 1949 he became an assistant professor in the Department of Meat and Animal Science at the University of Wisconsin-Madison. He remained there for the remainder of his career and retired in 1988 with the rank of professor emeritus.

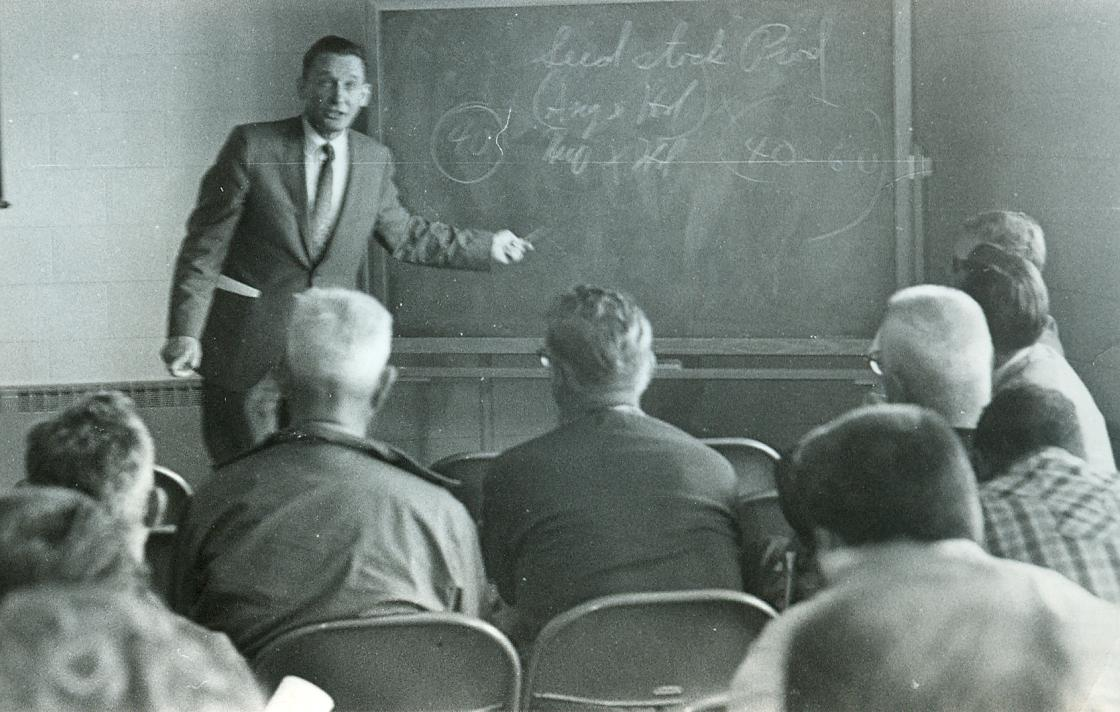
Hauser at work

== Research ==
Hauser was best known for his research on biological efficiency of the life cycle of beef cattle with special emphasis on genotype x environment interactions. This research was conducted largely with identical twin cattle. He subsequently did studies that, for the first time, demonstrated that photoperiod modified the processes leading to puberty and postpartum fertility in cattle.
