= Roger Blomquist =

Swedish sports journalist

- Born: Sven Roger Blomquist; 25 September 1956; Enköping, Sweden
- Died: 15 September 2014 (aged 57); Malmö, Sweden
- Occupation: Journalist

Sven Roger Blomquist (25 September 1956 – 15 September 2014) was a Swedish sports journalist, working for state broadcaster SVT. He died on 15 September 2014 after a brief illness, at age 57.
