= Basil Charles Elwell French =

British Anglican priest

The Venerable Basil Charles Elwell French MSM
- Archdeacon of the Great Dyke
- Church: Scottish Episcopal Church; Church of England

Orders
- Ordination: 17 March 1946

Personal details
- Born: 1919 United Kingdom
- Died: 11 September 2014 (aged 95) Exeter, Devon, England, UK
- Buried: Redhill, Somerset, England, UK
- Spouse: Grace French (d. 1992); Jane French
- Children: 2
- Profession: Priest; chaplain; archdeacon
- Education: Edinburgh Theological College

Ordination history of Basil Charles Elwell French
History
Diaconal ordination
- Date: 1945
Priestly ordination
- Date: 17 March 1946

Basil Charles Elwell French MSM (1919 - 11 September 2014) was a British Anglican priest who ministered in Rhodesia/Zimbabwe. Born in the United Kingdom, he was educated at Edinburgh Theological College and was ordained a priest in 1946. He moved to Ndola, Northern Rhodesia (now Zambia), in 1957, before relocating to the Federation of Rhodesia and Nyasaland, where he ministered to railway workers across southern Africa. In the 1960s, he served as priest in charge of parishes in the Mashonaland region and was Archdeacon of the Great Dyke. He also served as a prison chaplain and a Rhodesian Army chaplain, earning a Medal for Meritorious Service. He left Zimbabwe and returned to England in 1985, where he ministered into his 90s.

== Life and priesthood ==
French was born in 1919 in the United Kingdom. He studied at Edinburgh Theological College from 1941 to 1944, earning a Licentiate of Theology. He was ordained an Anglican deacon in 1945. From 1945 to 1946, he served at Christ Church, a Scottish Episcopal Church parish in Falkirk, Scotland. He was ordained a priest on Saint Patrick's Day, 17 March 1946. From 1946 to 1949, he ministered at St Aidan Church in Bristol. From 1949 to 1951, he served at Holy Trinity Church in Yeovil. From 1951 to 1958, he was perpetual curate of Ash, South Somerset. From 1957 to 1958, he was priest in charge of Christ Church in Long Load, South Somerset.

=== Ministry in Rhodesia ===
In 1957, French moved, with his family, to minister in Ndola, Northern Rhodesia (now Zambia), then part of the Federation of Rhodesia and Nyasaland. He was assistant priest at a parish there from 1959 to 1960. After his ministry in Ndola, he served as the chaplain to the Rhodesia and Nyasaland Railway Mission from 1960 to 1961. His ministry spanned an area from Bechuanaland (now Botswana) to the Lebombo Mountains in Portuguese Mozambique. In 1961 French moved to Southern Rhodesia, where he was priest in charge of Arcadia and Cranbourne, two suburbs of Salisbury (now Harare). He served there until 1969, when he became rector of Umvukwes (now Mvurwi), residing in St Andrew's Church rectory. From 1980 to 1985, he consequently served as Archdeacon of the Great Dyke and Mashonaland. As an archdeacon he was now referred to as The Venerable rather than The Reverend. French was a prison chaplain and an Army chaplain of the Rhodesian Security Forces. He was awarded Rhodesia's Medal for Meritorious Service.

=== Return to England ===
In 1985, five years after Rhodesia became Zimbabwe, French and his wife returned to England. There, he settled in Redhill, near Bristol, as a "house for duty" priest and was also honorary assistant curate of the Church of All Saints, Wrington in North Somerset from 1985 to 1988. His wife Grace died in 1992 and he later moved to Exeter, Devon. There, he continued to minister during priestly vacancies at local parishes in the Diocese of Exeter until his age and infirmity forced him to retire for good.

French died on 11 September 2014 in Woodhayes Nursing Home in Exeter, aged 95, after an extended illness. On 29 September, after a Requiem Eucharist in Exeter Cathedral, he was buried at Redhill, Somerset. Two members of his former Cranbourne church from his Africa years, now living in England, attended his requiem.

== Personal life ==
French met his wife Grace in the United Kingdom. They had two children: Simon (born 1946) and Anne-Claire (born 1949). Grace died in 1992. After moving to Exeter, French met his second wife, Jane.
