= Oldřich František Korte =

Oldřich František Korte (26 April 1926; Šaľa, Slovakia – 10 September 2014; Prague) was a Czech composer, pianist, publicist and writer.

From 1943 to 1949 he studied at the Prague Conservatory, as a pupil of F. Pícha. He was forced to interrupt his studies in 1944–45, when he was imprisoned in a concentration camp. Following the communist Victorious February in 1948 Korte was once more affected by the political situation in former Czechoslovakia. He was forced to find work out of the artistic professions. Nevertheless, he never gave up his musical and literary activities, and gradually became a respected composer and pianist.

Korte cooperated with the important Czech experimental theatre Laterna Magika, whose director Alfréd Radok offered him the post of pianist. He toured four continents with the ensemble of Laterna Magika, and played in more than 3000 performances.

== Style ==
Korte in his whole musical and literary output takes a non-conformist attitude; he is not a "composer of one style", in whose compositions a strict sense of logic musical rules prevails. He is partly influenced by the works of Bohuslav Martinů and Albert Roussel.

== Selected works ==
Music

- Sinfonietta (1947) - influenced by neo-classicism
- Sonata For Piano (1953) - rather expressionist composition
- The Story of Flutes (1958) - neo-romantic symphonic drama
- Philosophical Dialogues for violin and piano (1975)
- Concerto Grosso (1986) - influenced by neo-classicism
- Elihú kontra Job (1992) - fresque for violin and piano

Literature

- Chodící legendy (Walking Legends) (1991) - great personalities of the 20th century
