= Hilda Oates =

Cuban actress (1925–2014)

- Born: Hilda Oates Williams; 29 March 1925; Guanabacoa, Cuba
- Died: 19 September 2014 (aged 89); Havana, Cuba
- Occupation: Actress
- Years active: 1960s–2014

Hilda Oates Williams (25 March 1925 – 19 September 2014) was a Cuban stage and television actress. She was awarded with the National Theater Award in 2004.

== Filmography ==
Year	Title	Role	Notes
1976	Rancheador		
1979	Maluala		
1985	¡Patakín! quiere decir ¡fábula!	Mercedes, Shango's Mother	
1988	Gallego		
1991	El Encanto del Regreso	La conciencia	(final film role)
