= Takatada Ihara =

Japanese film director

- Born: 6 June 1929; Japan
- Died: 14 September 2014 (aged 85); Atlanta, Georgia, USA
- Occupation: Director

Takatada Ihara (6 June 1929 – 14 September 2014) was a Japanese television director and producer. Ihara died from heart disease at the age of 85 in the United States.
