= Howard A. Ozmon =

Howard Augustine Ozmon, Jr.
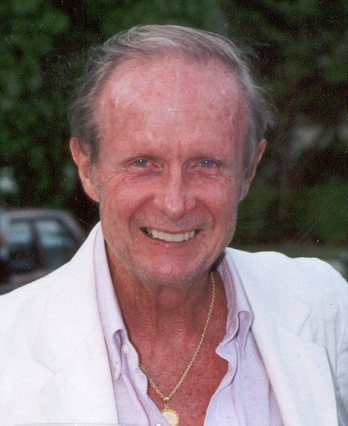
- Born: December 11, 1929; Portsmouth, Virginia, U.S.
- Died: September 6, 2014 (aged 84); Naples, Florida, U.S.

Academic work
- School or tradition: Eastern and Western Philosophy
- Main interests: Philosophy of Education, Social Justice

Howard Augustine Ozmon Jr. (December 11, 1929 – September 6, 2014) was an American philosopher who was a professor emeritus of Virginia Commonwealth University.

Ozmon lived in Portsmouth, Virginia, and received an A.A. degree from St. Bernard College in Alabama, a B.A. from the University of Virginia Alumni 1954 in Philosophy, a Master of Arts in International and Comparative Education, and an Ed.D. in Philosophy of Education from Teachers College, Columbia University. He taught in the public schools of New York and New Jersey, and at several colleges and universities, including the University of Virginia and Virginia Commonwealth University. He was also professor and chairman of the Department of Education at Chicago State University.

Ozmon was the author of many books and articles dealing with philosophy and education, including the eighth edition of Philosophical Foundations of Education re-published by Merrill Prentice-Hall (2008 & 2012). He is also a writer of novels, short stories, plays, and books for children including the following:

- Challenging Ideas in Education
- Dialogue in the Philosophy of Education (The Coordinated Teacher Preparation Series)
- Utopias and Education, Tall Enterprises, 1980
- Twelve Great Philosophers (The Wonderful World of Children's Books)
- Contemporary Critics of Education
- Challenging Ideas in Education

Howard lived in Naples, Florida. He died there on September 6, 2014, at the age of 84.
