= Daniel Dion =

Canadian artist (1958–2014)

Daniel Dion (1958 – September 28, 2014) was a Canadian contemporary artist.

== Career ==
Dion was known primarily as a video artist. Dion was also a cofounder, in 1982 with Sue Schnee, of the Montreal art gallery OBORO.

== Collections ==
Dion's work is included in the permanent collection of the National Gallery of Canada and the Musée national des beaux-arts du Québec.
