= Hari Kumar Audichya =

Indian politician

Hari Kumar Audichya (14 August 1930 – 17 September 2014) was an Indian politician of the Bharatiya Janata Party from Rajasthan. He was a member of Rajasthan Legislative Assembly from Kota and served as education minister of the state in 1980.
