= Deaths in August 2014 =

The following is a list of notable deaths in August 2014.

Entries for each day are listed alphabetically by surname. A typical entry lists information in the following sequence:

- Name, age, country of citizenship and reason for notability, established cause of death, reference.

== August 2014 ==
=== 1 ===
- Gretta Bader, 83, American portrait and bust sculptor, heart failure.
- Valyantsin Byalkevich, 41, Belarusian football player and coach, aneurysm.
- Godwin Chepkurgor, 45, Kenyan journalist, offered Bill Clinton dowry to marry Chelsea Clinton, injuries sustained in an elephant charge.
- Chung Eun-yong, 91, South Korean policeman, instigated United States admission of role in No Gun Ri Massacre.
- Norman Cornish, 94, English artist.
- Rod de'Ath, 64, Welsh drummer (Rory Gallagher).
- Jürgen Degenhardt, 83, German songwriter, actor, director and author, cancer.
- Karen X. Gaylord, 92, American actress (The Three Stooges).
- Don George, 80, American football player (BC Lions).
- Catherine Gregg, 96, American philanthropist and environmentalist, First Lady of New Hampshire (1953–1955), restored the Wentworth-Coolidge Mansion.
- Michael Johns, 35, Australian singer-songwriter (American Idol), blood clot.
- Jan Roar Leikvoll, 40, Norwegian author.
- Hossein Maadani, 43, Iranian volleyball player and coach, pancreatic failure.
- Charles T. Payne, 89, American soldier.
- Jewel Prestage, 82, American political scientist and author (A Portrait of Marginality).
- Saeed Saleh, 74, Egyptian actor (Madrast Al-Mushaghebeen).
- James Ditson Service, 88, Canadian politician.
- Mike Smith, 59, British television and radio presenter (BBC Radio 1), complications from heart surgery.

=== 2 ===
- Wolf-Dieter Ahlenfelder, 70, German Bundesliga referee.
- Mariana Alarcón, 27, Argentine human rights activist.
- James Anguilo, 74, Italian-American criminal.
- Luciano Borgognoni, 62, Italian Olympic cyclist.
- Brian Buckley, 78, Australian VFL football player (Carlton).
- Chelsea Clark, 31, Canadian athlete, neuroblastoma.
- Rosetta Hightower, 70, American R&B singer (The Orlons).
- Ed Joyce, 81, American television executive, President of CBS News (1983–1985).
- June Krauser, 88, American Hall of Fame swimmer, swimming official and rules writer, Parkinson's disease.
- Eroni Kumana, 93, Solomon Islander fisherman, rescued John F. Kennedy after PT-109 sinking.
- Billie Letts, 76, American novelist (Where the Heart Is), pneumonia.
- Kate O'Hanlon, 83–84, British nurse.
- Sir Alan Peacock, 92, British economist.
- Barbara Prammer, 60, Austrian politician, Women's Affairs and Consumer Protection Minister (1997–2000), President of the National Council (since 2006), pancreatic cancer.
- Sue Richards, 56, Canadian artist.
- James Thompson, 49, American-born Finnish crime writer.
- Pete Van Wieren, 69, American sports broadcaster (Atlanta Braves), cutaneous B-cell lymphoma.
- Olga Voronets, 88, Russian mezzo-soprano folk singer.

=== 3 ===
- Daladier Arismendi, 39, Colombian singer, stabbed.
- George Ashe, 81, Canadian politician, Ontario MPP for Durham West (1977–1987), Mayor of Pickering (1973–1977), Parkinson's disease.
- Miangul Aurangzeb, 86, Pakistani politician, Governor of Balochistan (1997–1999) and Khyber Pakhtunkhwa (1999).
- Charles Calhoun Jr., 83, American politician and judge, member of the Texas Senate.
- Fernando Casimiro, 83, Portuguese Olympic sprinter.
- Andrew Chatwood, 82, Canadian administrator and politician, heart failure.
- Edward Clancy, 90, Australian Roman Catholic prelate, Archbishop of Sydney (1983–2001).
- Tony Clunn, 68, British army officer and archaeologist, rediscovered Kalkriese site of Varus's defeat by Arminius.
- Cec Creedon, 92, Australian politician.
- Dorothy Salisbury Davis, 98, American crime fiction writer, recipient of the Grand Master Award (1985).
- Kenny Drew Jr., 56, American jazz pianist and composer.
- Robert H. Ellsworth, 85, American art dealer.
- Helmut Faeder, 79, German footballer (Hertha BSC, Hertha Zehlendorf).
- Emmanuel Farber, 95, Canadian-American physician.
- Christian Frémont, 72, French politician, chief of staff (Nicolas Sarkozy), Representative of the French Co-Prince of Andorra (2008–2012).
- Richard J. Gambino, 79, American material scientist.
- Yvette Giraud, 97, French singer and actress.
- Wimper Guerrero, 32, Ecuadorian footballer, heart attack.
- Jess Marlow, 84, American news broadcaster (KNBC, KCBS), complications from Alzheimer's disease.
- James McClure, 88, Northern Irish politician, chairman of the Democratic Unionist Party.
- Richard Newman, 89, Australian cricketer.
- Steve Post, 70, American radio broadcaster (WNYC), colon and lung cancer.
- Hal Sherbeck, 86, American football and baseball coach.
- Charles Simeons, 92, British politician, MP for Luton (1970–1974).
- David Smail, 76, British clinical psychologist.
- Benedito de Ulhôa Vieira, 93, Brazilian Roman Catholic prelate, Archbishop of Uberaba (1978–1996).
- Lydia Yu-Jose, 70, Filipino political scientist, non-Hodgkin lymphoma.

=== 4 ===
- Ashraf Abbasi, 91, Pakistani politician.
- James Brady, 73, American government official and gun control advocate, White House Press Secretary (1981–1989).
- Hugh Calkins, 90, American lawyer and educator.
- Rich Ceisler, 58, American stand-up comedian, Guillain–Barré syndrome.
- Chester Crandell, 68, American politician, member of the Arizona House of Representatives (2011–2013) and Senate (since 2013), horseriding fall.
- Julieka Ivanna Dhu, 22, Australian detainee, sepsis and pneumonia.
- Barbara DeGenevieve, 67, American artist, cancer.
- Irma Elizondo Ramírez, 68, Mexican politician, MP for Coahuila (since 2012), heart attack.
- George Hilton, 89, American historian, heart failure.
- Jake Hooker, 61, Israeli-born American pop musician (Arrows), co-writer ("I Love Rock 'n' Roll") and producer.
- Erich E. Kunhardt, 65, Dominican-born American physicist.
- Walter Massey, 85, Canadian actor (Arthur, Lassie, The Greatest Game Ever Played).
- Rodolfo Motta, 70, Argentine football player and coach.
- Rafael Santa Cruz, 53, Peruvian cajon musician and actor, heart attack.
- Walter J. Sullivan, 91, American politician, member of the Massachusetts House of Representatives (1951–1953), Mayor of Cambridge, heart failure.
- Peter A. Vellucci, 71–72, American politician, member of the Massachusetts House of Representatives.
- Bill Wall, 83, American basketball executive.

=== 5 ===
- Dmitri Anosov, 77, Russian mathematician.
- Arvind Apte, 79, Indian cricketer, prostate cancer.
- Joyce Baird, 85, Scottish medical researcher, Alzheimer's disease.
- Diann Blakely, 57, American poet, lung disorder.
- Elfriede Brüning, 103, German writer.
- Marilyn Burns, 65, American actress (The Texas Chain Saw Massacre).
- Ruth Sacks Caplin, 93, American screenwriter (Mrs. Palfrey at the Claremont), heart ailment.
- Scott Ciencin, 51, American adaption novelist (Godzilla, Kim Possible, Buffy the Vampire Slayer), blood clot.
- John Crawford III, 22, American murder victim, shot.
- Michael A. B. Deakin, 74-75, Australian mathematician and mathematics educator.
- Hans V. Engström, 65, Swedish actor (Rederiet), liver failure.
- Yakov Etinger, 84, Russian historian and political activist.
- Harold J. Greene, 55, American military officer, Army commanding general of NSRDEC, shot.
- Dave Hereora, 57, New Zealand politician, Labour Party list MP (2002–2008).
- Edward Leffingwell, 72, American art critic and curator.
- Khalil Morsi, 67, Egyptian actor.
- Joe McManemin, 91, New Zealand athletics coach and sports administrator.
- Angéla Németh, 68, Hungarian javelin thrower, Olympic (1968) and European (1969) champion.
- Richard Olson, 85, American politician, Mayor of Des Moines, Iowa (1972–1979), traffic collision.
- Vladimir Orlov, 77, Russian novelist.
- Chapman Pincher, 100, British journalist and historian.
- Rodrigo de Triano, 25, English thoroughbred, Cartier Champion Three-year-old Colt (1992), pneumonia.
- Yoshiki Sasai, 52, Japanese biologist (RIKEN), apparent suicide by hanging.
- Pran Kumar Sharma, 75, Indian cartoonist (Chacha Chaudhary), colon cancer.
- Jesse Leonard Steinfeld, 87, American naval officer and physician, Surgeon General (1969–1973), complications from a stroke.
- Ronnie Stonham, 87, British army officer and broadcasting adviser.
- Emanuel Tanay, 86, American physician and Holocaust survivor, prostate cancer.

=== 6 ===
- James L. Adams, 92, American politician, member of the Minnesota House of Representatives (1955–1974).
- Ralph Bryans, 72, Northern Irish Grand Prix motorcycle racer, World Champion (1965).
- Aloha Dalire, 64, American hula dancer, first Miss Aloha Hula winner (1971).
- Imre Bajor, 57, Hungarian actor, brain tumor.
- Ghaleb Barakat, 86, Jordanian diplomat and politician, Minister of Tourism and Antiquities (1967–1972).
- Clem Comly, 59, American baseball researcher and author.
- Julien Fourgeaud, 34, French entrepreneur, base jumping collision.
- Brent Galloway, 70, American linguist.
- Ananda W. P. Guruge, 85, Sri Lankan diplomat and academic.
- John Woodland Hastings, 87, American biochemist, pioneer in antibiotics research, pulmonary fibrosis.
- Stephen Heinemann, 75, American neuroscientist, complications from kidney failure.
- Macarthur Job, 88, Australian aviation writer and air safety consultant.
- Mara Lane, 84, Austrian-born British actress (Innocents in Paris, Susan Slept Here, Love from Paris).
- Norman Lane, 94, Canadian Olympic bronze medallist* sprint canoer (1948*, 1952).
- Li Hu, 40, Chinese HIV activist, complications from AIDS.
- Ken Lucas, 73, American professional wrestler (NWA).
- Antonio Marcilla, 80, Argentine Olympic boxer.
- Frank Shipway, 79, British conductor.
- Andrey Stenin, 33, Russian photojournalist.
- Smita Talwalkar, 59, Indian film actress, producer (Tu Tithe Mee) and director, ovarian cancer.
- Dharmesh Tiwari, 63, Indian actor (Mahabharat), cardiac arrest.
- Jimmy Walsh, 83, British footballer.
- David Weidman, 93, American animator (The Famous Adventures of Mr. Magoo, Wacky Races) and silkscreen artist (Mad Men).

=== 7 ===
- Claude Bertrand, 97, Canadian neurosurgeon.
- Robin Brunyee, 75, English sprinter.
- Dick Collver, 78, Canadian politician.
- Cristina Deutekom, 82, Dutch coloratura soprano opera singer, fall.
- Víctor Fayad, 59, Argentine politician, Mayor of Mendoza (since 2007), mediastinum cancer.
- Walter R. Hanson, 83, American politician, member of the Minnesota House of Representatives (1971–1982).
- Mary Healy, 60, American zoo executive, CEO and director of the Sacramento Zoo, cerebral aneurysm and heart attack.
- Mitsuo Higashinaka, 90, Japanese politician, member of the House of Representatives for Osaka's 2nd District (1969–2000), lung cancer.
- William Jones, 89, Uruguayan Olympic rower.
- Michael Kerrigan, 61, British television director (Doctor Who, Coronation Street).
- Suruli Manohar, Indian comic actor, cancer.
- Perry Moss, 88, American football coach (Montreal Alouettes, Orlando Predators) and player (Green Bay Packers), complications from a neuromuscular disease.
- Alberto Pérez Zabala, 89, Spanish footballer.
- Harold Poole, 70, American bodybuilder.
- Syed Rahim, 85, Indian cricketer.
- Henry Stone, 93, American record company executive and record producer (TK Records).
- Ayman Taha, Palestinian militant and spokesman (Hamas).
- Ekanath K. Thakur, 73, Indian politician and finance executive, MP for Maharashtra (2002–2008), chairman of Saraswat Bank, cancer.
- Voytek, 89, Polish-born British television director and production designer.
- Sir Denys Williams, 84, Barbadian judge, member and Chief Judge of the Supreme Court, Acting Governor-General (1995–1996).

=== 8 ===
- Martin V. B. Bostetter, 86, American judge.
- Luciano Bux, 78, Italian Roman Catholic prelate, Bishop of Oppido Mamertina-Palmi (2000–2011).
- Edmund Collins, 83, Australian Roman Catholic prelate, Bishop of Darwin (1986–2007).
- Menahem Golan, 85, Israeli director and producer (Operation Thunderbolt, The Delta Force, Masters of the Universe), recipient of the Israel Prize (1999).
- Charles Keating, 72, English Emmy Award-winning actor (All My Children, Another World), lung cancer.
- Viktor Kopyl, 54, Ukrainian footballer (Karpaty Lviv, Volyn Lutsk).
- Leonardo Legaspi, 78, Filipino Roman Catholic prelate, Archbishop of Caceres (1983–2012), Rector of University of Santo Tomas, lung cancer.
- Danny Murphy, 58, American actor (There's Something About Mary, Me, Myself & Irene), cancer.
- J. J. Murphy, 86, Northern Irish actor (Mickybo and Me, Angela's Ashes, Game of Thrones).
- Arthur Olsen, 100, American politician, member of the Nevada Assembly.
- Simon Scott, 47, British artist and musician.
- Peter Sculthorpe, 85, Australian composer (Kakadu).
- Åke W. Sjöberg, 90, Swedish assyriologist.
- Michael K. Smith, 48, American politician, member of the Illinois House of Representatives (1995–2011), heart attack.
- Red Wilson, 85, American baseball player (Detroit Tigers).

=== 9 ===
- J. F. Ade Ajayi, 85, Nigerian academic and historian of Africa.
- Andriy Bal, 56, Ukrainian football player (Soviet national team) and coach (national team), blood clot.
- Michael Brown, 18, American student, shot.
- Manuel Caldeira, 87, Portuguese footballer.
- Arthur G. Cohen, 84, American real estate developer (Crowne Plaza Hotel, Royalton Hotel, One Worldwide Plaza, Olympic Tower).
- Mary A. Conroy, 82, American politician, hepatitis.
- Jerome Ehlers, 55, Australian actor (Quigley Down Under, The Marine, The Great Raid), cancer.
- Henry Ezeagwuna II, Nigerian royal, traditional leader of Issele-Uku, traffic collision.
- J. E. Freeman, 68, American actor (Miller's Crossing, Alien Resurrection, Wild at Heart).
- Charles Gelatt, 96, American businessman and philanthropist.
- Trevor Boots Harris, 69, Jamaican entertainment journalist and broadcaster, heart attack.
- Wayne Ison, 90, American aircraft designer (Team Mini-Max).
- Merle G. Kearns, 76, American politician, member of the Ohio House of Representatives (2001–2005) and Senate (1991–2000).
- Alexander Kwapong, 87, Ghanaian academic, Vice Chancellor of the University of Ghana.
- Dave Lloyd, 77, American football player (Cleveland Browns, Philadelphia Eagles).
- Khayelihle Mathaba, South African royal and politician, KwaZulu-Natal MLA, chieftain of the eMacambini, traffic collision.
- Ernest Meighan, 43, Belizean Olympic cyclist, shot.
- Yasuyuki Nakai, 60, Japanese baseball player (Yomiuri Giants), esophageal cancer.
- Ed Nelson, 85, American actor (Gunsmoke, Murder, She Wrote, Peyton Place), heart failure.
- George Nicholaw, 86, American radio executive (KNX).
- Henry Pease, 69, Peruvian politician and political scientist, member of DCC (1992–1995) and Congress (1995–2006), cardiac arrest as a complication from cancer.
- Stanley Reiter, 89, American economist.
- Norris Stubbs, 65, Bahamian Olympic sprinter.
- Emigdio Vasquez, 75, American muralist and pictorial artist, pneumonia.
- Myrtle Young, 90, American potato chip collector, heart failure.

=== 10 ===
- Constantin Alexandru, 60, Romanian wrestler, Olympic silver medalist (1980).
- Gabriel Acosta Bendek, 83, Colombian politician, Senator (1994–2010), heart attack.
- Peter Chippindale, 69, British newspaper journalist (The Guardian) and author.
- Jim Command, 85, American baseball player (Philadelphia Phillies).
- Carlos Espejo, 90, Argentine Olympic swimmer.
- Graham Gedye, 85, New Zealand cricketer (national team).
- Frederick Jacob Reagan Heebe, 91, American senior judge, member (since 1966) and Chief Judge (1972–1992) of the U.S. District Court for Eastern Louisiana.
- Stanley Hochman, 89, American book publisher and editor.
- John Kearney, 89, American sculptor.
- Princess Lalla Fatima Zohra, 85, Moroccan royal.
- Dotty Lynch, 69, American television journalist and editor (CBS News), melanoma.
- Metakse, 88, Armenian poet, writer and translator.
- Dame Kathleen Ollerenshaw, 101, British mathematician and politician, Lord Mayor of Manchester (1975–1976), mentor and advisor to Margaret Thatcher.
- Ann Rowan, 85, Irish actress (The Riordans, Father Ted).
- Shree Krishna Shrestha, 47, Nepalese actor, pneumonia.
- Ima Wells, 77, American politician, member of the New Mexico House of Representatives (1993).
- Bob Wiesler, 83, American baseball player (New York Yankees, Washington Senators).

=== 11 ===
- Nadezhda Andreyeva, 55, Russian Soviet alpine skier.
- Raquel Barros, 94, Chilean folklorist, fall.
- Vladimir Beara, 85, Yugoslav football player (national team) and manager, Olympic silver medalist (1952).
- Jean-Claude Brisville, 92, French writer, playwright, novelist and author for children.
- Ralph B. Brown, 54, American sociologist, pancreatic cancer.
- Djalma Cavalcante, 57, Brazilian football player and coach, heart attack.
- Armando Círio, 98, Italian-born Brazilian Roman Catholic prelate, Archbishop of Cascavel (1978–1995).
- Vol Dooley, 87, American police sheriff.
- Martin Erler, 93-94, German philatelist.
- Sir Leonard Figg, 90, British diplomat, Ambassador to Ireland (1980–1983).
- Raymond Gravel, 61, Canadian Québécois Roman Catholic priest and politician, MP for Repentigny (2006–2008), lung cancer.
- Morkos Hakim, 83, Egyptian Coptic Catholic hierarch, Bishop of Sohag (1982–2003).
- Sam Hall, 77, American Olympic silver-medalist diver (1960), politician and mercenary, member of the Ohio House of Representatives.
- Liz Holzman, 61, American animation designer, producer and director (DuckTales, Animaniacs, The Smurfs), cancer.
- Reshamlal Jangade, 90, Indian politician, MP for Bilaspur (1952–1961, 1989–1991), Madhya Pradesh MLA (1950–1952).
- Maibam Kunjo, 73, Indian politician.
- Rolf Larsen, 79, American judge, member of the Pennsylvania Supreme Court (1978–1994), only justice ever impeached by Pennsylvania Senate, lung cancer.
- Simon Leys, 78, Belgian diplomat, Australian sinologist and author (Chinese Shadows), cancer.
- Frank E. Marble, 96, American aerospace engineer.
- Marion Milne, 79, American politician, member of the Vermont House of Representatives (1995–2001).
- Stelio Nardin, 74, Italian footballer (Napoli).
- Dame Julia Polak, 75, Argentinian-born British pathologist.
- Kika Szaszkiewiczowa, 97, Polish artist, writer and blogger.
- Franca Tamantini, 82, Italian actress.
- Joe Viskocil, 61, American visual effects artist (Independence Day, Star Wars, The Terminator), Oscar winner (1997), complications from liver and kidney failure.
- Robin Williams, 63, American actor (Good Will Hunting, Aladdin, Mork & Mindy) and comedian, Oscar winner (1998), suicide by hanging.

=== 12 ===
- Carlos Abella y Ramallo, 80, Spanish diplomat, Ambassador to Kenya (1987–1991) and the Holy See (1996–2004).
- Lauren Bacall, 89, American actress (Key Largo, The Mirror Has Two Faces, Written on the Wind), Tony winner (1970, 1981), stroke.
- Purdy Crawford, 82, Canadian corporate lawyer and financier, CEO and chairman of Imasco, Allstream Inc. and Canada Trust.
- Velva Darnell, 75, American country singer.
- Daroji Eramma, 83-84, Indian folk singer.
- Frank Eisenberg, 70, German Olympic athlete.
- Samuel Olatunde Fadahunsi, 94, Nigerian civil engineer.
- Jean Favier, 82, French historian, director of National Archives, president of the National Library.
- Pierino Gelmini, 89, Italian Roman Catholic priest.
- Hugh Harding, 88, Maltese judge.
- Norman Hewitt, 86, American politician.
- Javad Heyat, 89, Iranian surgeon and journalist.
- Newt Hudson, 86, American politician, member of the Georgia House of Representatives (1982–2002).
- Futatsuryū Jun'ichi, 64, Japanese sumo wrestler, lung cancer.
- Abel Laudonio, 75, Argentine actor and boxer, Olympic bronze medalist (1960), stroke.
- Gordon Mackenzie, 77, American baseball player (Kansas City Athletics) and coach.
- Arlene Martel, 78, American actress (Star Trek, Hogan's Heroes, The Twilight Zone), heart attack.
- Kongō Masahiro, 65, Japanese sumo wrestler, pneumonia.
- Lida Moser, 93, American photographer.
- Frederick Gale Ruffner Jr., 88, American publisher.
- Kazimierz Trampisz, 85, Polish Olympic footballer.

=== 13 ===
- Hani Abbadi, Jordanian politician, member of the House of Representatives (1993–1997).
- Bernard Blum, 75, French agricultural scientist, heart attack.
- Pierre Boisson, 84, Monegasque Olympic sport shooter (1972, 1976, 1984).
- Steve Brook, 80, British-born Australian satirical writer.
- Frans Brüggen, 79, Dutch musician.
- Eduardo Campos, 49, Brazilian politician, Minister of Science and Technology (2004–2005), Governor of Pernambuco (2007–2014), 2014 presidential candidate, plane crash.
- Columba Domínguez, 85, Mexican actress (Pueblerina).
- Martino Finotto, 80, Italian racing driver.
- Edith Flagg, 94, Romanian-born American fashion designer, pioneer in the use of polyester.
- Werner Franz, 92, German cabin boy (LZ 129 Hindenburg) and skating coach.
- Frank W. Hirschi, 89, American politician, member of the Idaho House of Representatives (1960–1996).
- Buddy Jones, 77, American bluegrass musician.
- Alan Landsburg, 81, American screenwriter, film producer (Jaws 3-D), racehorse owner and official, chairman of the California Horse Racing Board.
- Eino Mäkinen, 88, Finnish Olympic weightlifter.
- Fanny Morweiser, 74, German writer.
- Ed Nather, 87, American astronomer.
- Joel J. Nobel, 79, American physician.
- James J. Schiro, 68, American executive (PricewaterhouseCoopers), multiple myeloma.
- Rainer Schubert, 72, German Olympic hurdler.
- Dorothy Schwieder, 80, American biographer and historian, lymphoma.
- Süleyman Seba, 88, Turkish football player and sport executive, president of Beşiktaş J.K., respiratory tract infection.
- Jack Shallcrass, 91, New Zealand author, educator, and humanist.
- Robert Bruce Smith IV, 69, American music expert, writer, historian, and poet, traffic collision.
- Milton Moore Snodgrass, 81, American author.
- Tadashi Takamura, 81, Japanese photographer.
- Terence Todman, 88, American diplomat, Ambassador to Chad, Guinea, Costa Rica, Spain, Denmark and Argentina.
- Kurt Tschenscher, 85, German football referee.
- Frank Udvari, 90, Canadian Hall of Fame NHL referee.
- Tom Veen, 72, Dutch politician, member of the States of Gelderland (1974–1981) and Senate of the Netherlands (1979–1983).
- Alan Woolworth, 89, American archaeologist.

=== 14 ===
- Kaija Aarikka, 85, Finnish designer.
- Paul Aldread, 67, English footballer.
- Ronnie Alsup, 59, American paralympic athlete and standing volleyball player.
- Mariana Briski, 48, Argentine actress, breast and lung cancer.
- Emile Capgras, 88, Martinican politician, President of the Regional Council (1992–1998).
- Pedro Caino, 58, Argentine Olympic cyclist.
- Rory Chappell, 55, South African tennis player.
- John Cinicola, 85, American basketball coach (Duquesne Dukes), cancer.
- Madeleine Collinson, 62, Maltese actress.
- Leonard Fein, 80, American Jewish activist, academic, editor (Moment), columnist (Forward) and author, founder of MAZON and Moment.
- Vernon F. Gallagher, 99, American Roman Catholic priest.
- Gregory Grossman, 93, Soviet-born American economist and scholar.
- Ada Haug Grythe, 79, Norwegian journalist.
- Géza Gulyás, 85, Hungarian footballer (Ferencváros).
- Javier Guzmán, 69, Mexican footballer (Cruz Azul, national team), diabetes.
- George V. Hansen, 83, American politician, member of the U.S. House for Idaho's 2nd district (1965–1969, 1975–1985).
- Peter M. Harman, 70, British historian.
- Jeremiah Healy, 66, American crime novelist
- Josef Kapín, 69, Czech Olympic boxer.
- Stephen Lee, 58, American actor (The Negotiator, Nash Bridges, WarGames), heart attack.
- George Linton, 57, Barbadian cricketer (national team) and coach.
- Rivka Bertisch Meir, 72, Argentine-American psychologist, mental health counselor, and psychotherapist.
- Rick Parashar, 50, American record producer (Pearl Jam, Temple of the Dog, Alice in Chains), blood clot.
- Mervyn Susser, 92, South African activist and epidemiologist.

=== 15 ===
- Jay Adams, 53, American skateboarder, heart attack.
- Licia Albanese, 105, Italian-born American operatic soprano.
- John Blake Jr., 67, American jazz violinist, multiple myeloma.
- Pierre Bussières, 81, Canadian politician.
- James Cama, 56, American martial artist and teacher.
- Jim Carrigan, 84, American senior judge, member of the U.S. District Court for Colorado (1979–1995) and the Colorado Supreme Court (1976–1979).
- Timothy Cathcart, 20, Northern Irish rally driver, race collision.
- Chen Kuei-miao, 81, Taiwanese politician, member of the Legislative Yuan (1990–1998), co-founder of the New Party.
- Piet de Ruiter, 75, Dutch politician and editor, member of the House of Representatives (1971–1976).
- Jan Ekier, 100, Polish pianist, composer and competition judge, Chopin authority, a winner of the Chopin Competition (1937), recipient of the Order of the White Eagle (2010).
- Barbara Funkhouser, 84, American newspaper journalist and journalism academic, editor of the El Paso Times (1980–1986).
- James Freeman Gilbert, 83, American geophysicist.
- Sylvia Hassenfeld, 93, American activist and philanthropist.
- Ken Hawley, 87, British industrial historian.
- Lynn Hovland, 98, American football player and coach.
- Sulejman Kupusović, 63, Bosnian film director.
- Jerry Lumpe, 81, American baseball player (Kansas City Athletics, Detroit Tigers, New York Yankees).
- Amitava Nandy, 71, Indian politician, MP for Dum Dum (2004–2009), cancer.
- Svein Nymo, 61, Norwegian violinist and composer.
- Bruno Petroni, 72, Italian footballer.
- Ferdinando Riva, 84, Swiss footballer.
- Joseph T. Walsh, 84, American judge, member of the Delaware Supreme Court (1985–2003), cancer.
- Dare Wilson, 95, British army major general (SAS), Military Cross recipient.

=== 16 ===
- Patrick Aziza, 66, Nigerian military officer and political leader, Military Governor of Kebbi (1991–1992), cancer.
- Kevin Barry, 78, New Zealand rugby union player (Thames Valley, national team).
- Besim Bokshi, 83, Albanian poet, linguist and philologist.
- Fannie Mae Clackum, 85, American soldier.
- Bernard F. Fisher, 87, American air force officer, Medal of Honor recipient.
- Liam Flood, 71, Irish bookmaker and poker player.
- Adrián Gaona, 40, Mexican journalist, murdered. (death announced on this date)
- David Glass, 77, Israeli politician, member of the Knesset (1977–1981).
- Raul Goco, 84, Filipino jurist and diplomat, Solicitor General (1992–1996), Ambassador to Canada, pneumonia and renal failure.
- Mustafa Hussein, 79, Egyptian cartoonist and journalist, cancer.
- Gary Ilman, 71, American Olympic swimmer.
- Deirdre Eberly Lashgari, 73, American literary critic and editor.
- Andy MacMillan, 85, Scottish architect
- Mike Matarazzo, 48, American bodybuilder, heart problems.
- Njoroge Mungai, 88, Kenyan politician, Minister for Foreign Affairs (1969–1974).
- Vsevolod Nestayko, 84, Ukrainian children's writer.
- Shaken Niyazbekov, 75, Kazakhstani artist, designed the national flag.
- Mario Oriani-Ambrosini, 53, Italian-born South African politician, MP (since 2009), lung cancer.
- Peter Scholl-Latour, 90, German newspaper and television journalist, Middle East correspondent and author.
- Fernand St Germain, 86, American politician, member of the U.S. House of Representatives for Rhode Island's 1st district (1961–1989).
- Tsang Shu-ki, 64, Hong Kong economist and social activist (Meeting Point).

=== 17 ===
- Abdullah Yeop Noordin, 74, Malaysian football player.
- Emilia Castro de Barish, 98, Costa Rican diplomat.
- Rosalba Rincon Castell, 79, Colombian fencing coach.
- Dragoljub Čirić, 78, Serbian chess player.
- Sammy Conn, 52, Scottish footballer (Airdrieonians, Falkirk), motor neurone disease.
- Christian Cuch, 70, French cyclist.
- Caterina De Nave, 67, New Zealand television and film producer (Shortland Street).
- Ger van Elk, 73, Dutch artist.
- Cliff Frazier, 61, American football player (Kansas City Chiefs) and actor (North Dallas Forty, House Party), lung cancer.
- Michael A. Hoey, 79, British producer, director and screenwriter (Fame, Falcon Crest).
- Arend van 't Hoft, 80, Dutch Olympic cyclist.
- Ricardo Izurieta, 71, Chilean military officer, Army Commander-in-chief (1998–2002).
- Raymond Kalinowski, 72, American politician.
- Børre Knudsen, 76, Norwegian minister and anti-abortion activist.
- Pierre Lagaillarde, 83, French politician, a founder of the OAS.
- Wolfgang Leonhard, 93, German historian, last living member of the Ulbricht Group.
- Rebecca Lepkoff, 98, American photographer.
- Marie Little, 81, Australian sport administrator.
- Sophie Masloff, 96, American politician, Mayor of Pittsburgh (1988–1994).
- Royall T. Moore, 83, American-born British mycologist.
- Miodrag Pavlović, 85, Serbian poet, writer and critic.
- Bill Pickering, 93, English swimmer.
- Sérgio Rodrigues, 84, Brazilian Olympic swimmer and water polo player.
- David Russell, 75, South African Anglican prelate, Bishop of Grahamstown (1987–2004).
- Nicholas Russell, 6th Earl Russell, 45, British aristocrat and disability rights campaigner, thrombosis.
- Anatoliy Samotsvetov, 81, Russian Olympic hammer thrower.
- Joanie Spina, 61, American magician.
- Eliaba James Surur, 83, Sudanese politician.
- Dick Teed, 88, American baseball player (Brooklyn Dodgers).
- Pierre Vassiliu, 76, Swiss-born French singer.

=== 18 ===
- Suzie d'Auvergne, 71, Saint Lucian barrister and jurist, High Court judge (1990–2004).
- Drew Bernstein, 51, American punk, goth, fetish fashion designer and musician, suicide.
- Ricardo Cabot Boix, 97, Spanish Olympic field hockey player.
- Enoch Callaway, 90, American psychiatrist.
- Per Engebretsen, 67, Norwegian civil servant.
- Gordon Faber, 83, American politician.
- Frank Fossella, 88, American politician.
- Sam Galbraith, 68, British politician, MP and MSP for Strathkelvin and Bearsden.
- James Alexander Gordon, 78, British radio broadcaster (BBC Radio 5 Live).
- Elmer Gray, 91, American baseball scout.
- Lawrence N. Guarino, 92, American Air Force colonel, prisoner of war.
- Drew Hutton, 60, Canadian politician.
- Hashim Khan, 100, Pakistani squash player, heart failure.
- Jim Jeffords, 80, American politician, member of the U.S. House of Representatives for Vermont's at-large district (1975–1989), Senator for Vermont (1989–2007).
- Levente Lengyel, 81, Hungarian chess player.
- Hans-Joachim Merker, 84, German physician and anatomist.
- Jean Nicolay, 76, Belgian footballer, winner of the Belgian Golden Shoe (1963).
- Paul Nguyên Thanh Hoan, 74, Vietnamese Roman Catholic prelate, Bishop of Phan Thiêt (2001–2009).
- Don Pardo, 96, American radio and television announcer (Saturday Night Live, Jeopardy!).
- Nobuyuki Sekiyama, 80, Japanese politician, member of the House of Representatives for Niigata's 1st district (1983–1996), stomach cancer.
- Doug Williams, 91, Australian footballer (Carlton).

=== 19 ===
- Ameyo Adadevoh, 57, Nigerian physician, Ebola virus disease.
- Samih al-Qasim, 75, Palestinian Druze poet and journalist, cancer.
- Elaine M. Alphin, 58, American author.
- Carlos Arango, 86, Colombian footballer.
- Joginder Singh Bakshi, 81, Indian lieutenant general.
- Mercedes Baptista, 93, Brazilian ballet dancer and choreographer, diabetes.
- M. J. Bayarri, 57, Spanish statistician.
- Jacques Beaulieu, 82, Canadian physicist.
- Simin Behbahani, 87, Iranian writer and poet.
- Manuel da Costa, 68, Portuguese Olympic equestrian.
- Richard Dauenhauer, 72, American poet, historian and translator, expert on Tlingit history and language, pancreatic cancer.
- Linda Dégh, 94, Hungarian-born American folklorist and academic.
- Joe Edwards, 59, American politician.
- Francisco García Escalero, 66, Spanish serial killer.
- James Foley, 40, American photojournalist, beheading. (death reported on this date)
- Tom Forehand, 67, American politician, cancer.
- Yves Fortier, 100, Canadian geologist.
- Sam Foster, 82, British politician, MLA for Fermanagh and South Tyrone (1998–2003).
- Hayk Ghazaryan, 83, Armenian historian.
- Bob Glading, 94, New Zealand golfer, winner of New Zealand Open (1946, 1947).
- Brian G. Hutton, 79, American actor (King Creole) and film director (Kelly's Heroes, Where Eagles Dare), complications from a heart attack.
- Grantland Johnson, 65, American politician.
- Gladys Keating, 91, American civic activist and politician.
- Kåre Kolberg, 78, Norwegian composer.
- Adyar K. Lakshman, 80, Indian dancer.
- Geoffrey Leech, 78, British linguist.
- Candida Lycett Green, 71, British author, pancreatic cancer.
- Jackie Mayo, 89, American baseball player (Philadelphia Phillies).
- George Munroe, 92, American basketball player (St. Louis Bombers, Boston Celtics).
- Dinu Patriciu, 64, Romanian businessman and politician, liver disease.
- Tom Pevsner, 87, German-born British film producer (GoldenEye, Julia).
- Henry Plée, 91, French karate master.
- Odessa Sathyan, 56, Indian documentary filmmaker, pancreatic cancer.
- David St John Thomas, 84, English publisher and writer.
- Deborah Sussman, 83, American graphic designer and artist, breast cancer.
- Walter Thirring, 87, Austrian physicist.
- Maruxa Vilalta, 81, Mexican playwright and theatre director.
- Jean-Pierre Voisin, 81, Swiss Olympic basketball player.
- Gershon Yankelewitz, 104, Belarusian-born American rabbi.

=== 20 ===
- Eric Barber, 72, Irish footballer (Shelbourne).
- Laurie Baymarrwangga, 96-97, Australian Aboriginal traditional owner.
- Tamás Beck, 85, Hungarian politician, Minister of Trade (1988–1990).
- Anton Buslov, 30, Russian blogger and magazine columnist (The New Times).
- Lois Mai Chan, 80, American librarian, professor and author.
- Boris Dubin, 67, Russian sociologist and translator.
- Joseph J. Fauliso, 98, American politician, Lieutenant Governor of Connecticut (1980–1991).
- Morteza Hosseini Fayaz, 85, Iraqi Twelver Marja'.
- Ken Griffiths, 69, New Zealand-born British photographer, complications from motor neuron disease.
- Christian Guilbert, 86, French Olympic rower.
- Herm Hedderick, 84, American basketball player (New York Knicks).
- B. K. S. Iyengar, 95, Indian yogi, founder of Iyengar Yoga, heart attack and renal failure.
- Nafe Katter, 86, American actor and stage director.
- Buddy MacMaster, 89, Canadian fiddler.
- Margaret Marks, 96, New Zealand cricketer.
- John Bryce McLeod, 84, British mathematician.
- Aiko Miyawaki, 84, Japanese sculptor, pancreatic cancer.
- Rudy Ortiz, 51, Guatemalan military officer, head of the military, helicopter crash.
- José Luis Saldívar, 60, Mexican football player (Monterrey) and coach (Cruz Azul), cardiac arrest.
- Earleen Sizemore, 76, American politician.
- Sava Stojkov, 89, Serbian painter.
- Edmund Szoka, 86, American Roman Catholic prelate, cardinal, Archbishop of Detroit (1981–1990), President of the Pontifical Commission for Vatican City State (1997–2006).
- Jan Thorstensen, 81, Norwegian Olympic alpine skier (1956).
- Andrew F. Wissemann, 86, American Episcopal prelate, Bishop of Western Massachusetts.

=== 21 ===
- Raed al Atar, c. 40, Palestinian militant (Hamas), missile strike.
- Gerry Anderson, 69, British broadcaster (BBC Northern Ireland).
- Helen Bamber, 89, British psychotherapist.
- Don Clark, 96, English footballer (Bristol City).
- Robert E. Connick, 97, American professor emeritus (UC Berkeley).
- Mohammad Dabbas, 86–87, Jordanian politician, Minister of Finance (1976–1979).
- Joan Erbe, 87, American artist.
- Karen Gale, 65, American neuroscientist.
- Peter Handrinos, 42, American author.
- Robert Hansen, 75, American convicted serial killer.
- Robert Herkes, 83, American politician, member of the Hawaii State Legislature.
- Glyn Jenkins, 87, Australian politician, member of the Victorian Legislative Council (1970–1982).
- John Macklin, 66, British Hispanist.
- Maximum Capacity, 46, American professional wrestler, colorectal cancer.
- Steven R. Nagel, 67, American astronaut, melanoma.
- Jean Redpath, 77, Scottish folk singer-songwriter, cancer.
- Albert Reynolds, 81, Irish politician, Taoiseach (1992–1994).
- Mary Thomas, 70, American Pima politician, first female Governor of the Gila River Indian Community (1994–2000).
- Verna Vels, 81, South African screenwriter and programme director.
- Robert Wiemer, 76, American television director (Star Trek: The Next Generation, Superboy, The Night Train to Kathmandu).

=== 22 ===
- Abu Mosa, Islamic State press officer, air strike.
- John Fellows Akers, 79, American businessman, President (1983–1989) and CEO (1985–1993) of IBM.
- U. R. Ananthamurthy, 81, Indian writer, cardiac arrest and renal failure.
- Lekhraj Bachani, 85, Indian politician, member of the Rajya Sabha (2000–2006).
- Donald A. Beattie, 83, American aerospace scientist.
- John Binienda, 67, American politician, member of the Massachusetts House of Representatives (since 1986), diabetes and kidney disease.
- Jean Sutherland Boggs, 92, Canadian art historian, Director of the Philadelphia Museum of Art (1979–1982).
- Winifred Dawson, 85, English librarian and biographer, stroke.
- Sir Philip Dowson, 90, British architect.
- Bohumila Grögerová, 93, Czech poet, recipient of the Magnesia Litera (2009).
- Jack Harris, 91, Australian golf player.
- Stella K. Hershan, 99, Austrian-American novelist.
- Franz Hillenkamp, 78, German scientist.
- Richard Holden, 67, American highway patrolman.
- Peter Hopkirk, 83, British journalist and author (The Great Game).
- Jean-Marie Joubert, 82, French Olympic cyclist.
- Emmanuel Kriaras, 107, Greek lexicographer and philologist, heart attack.
- Pete Ladygo, 86, American football player (Pittsburgh Steelers).
- Noella Leduc, 80, American baseball player (AAGPBL).
- Helen Mason, 99, New Zealand potter.
- Nariman Mehta, 94, Indian-born American pharmacologist.
- Roy Andrew Miller, 89, American linguist.
- John Miscovich, 96, American inventor and gold miner.
- Bruce L. Monks, 90, American politician.
- Renato Mori, 79, Italian actor and voice actor. (La Piovra)
- Douglas Sang Hue, 82, Jamaican cricket umpire.
- John Satterwhite, 71, American Olympic shooter (1976).
- Amy Shuman, 89, American baseball player.
- Adel Smith, 54, Italian Muslim activist.
- John Sperling, 93, American businessman, founder of the University of Phoenix.
- John S. Waugh, 85, American chemist and professor (MIT), recipient of the Irving Langmuir Award (1976) and the Wolf Prize in Chemistry (1983).
- Ed Whitaker, 76, American stock car team owner.

=== 23 ===
- Albert Ebossé Bodjongo, 24, Cameroonian footballer (Douala AC, Perak FA, JS Kabylie), head injury from projectile.
- Jaime Giraldo Ángel, 84, Colombian politician and psychologist, Minister of Justice (1990–1991).
- Sally Buck, 83, American baseball team part-owner (Philadelphia Phillies).
- Jack Edwards, 83, Australian football player (North Melbourne).
- Dursun Ali Eğribaş, 81, Turkish Olympic wrestler (1956).
- Michael Field, 81, American gastroenterologist.
- Inga Juuso, 68, Norwegian singer and actress.
- Annefleur Kalvenhaar, 20, Dutch cross-country cyclist, European Cyclo-cross under-23 champion (2013), race collision.
- Dan Magill, 93, American college tennis coach and sports information director (Georgia Bulldogs).
- Hajo Meyer, 90, German-Dutch physicist and Holocaust survivor.
- William Thomson Newnham, 91, Canadian educationalist, President of Seneca College.
- Adnan Omran, 57–58, Syrian general, landmine.
- Ahti Pekkala, 89, Finnish politician, Speaker of the Parliament (1978–1979), Governor of Oulu Province (1986–1991).
- Jindřich Pokorný, 87, Czech translator.
- Marcel Rigout, 86, French politician.
- Philippine de Rothschild, 80, French winemaker.
- Bobo Sikorski, 87, Canadian football player (BC Lions).
- Birgitta Stenberg, 82, Swedish author, illustrator and translator, hepatocellular carcinoma.
- Jaume Vallcorba Plana, 64, Spanish philologist and publisher.
- Elsa Wiezell, 87, Paraguayan poet.

=== 24 ===
- Richard Attenborough, 90, English actor (The Great Escape, Jurassic Park) and film director (Gandhi), Oscar winner (1983).
- Greg Corbett, 41, American banjo player.
- Alexander Monteith Currie, 86, British university administrator.
- Antônio Ermírio de Moraes, 86, Brazilian businessman, CEO of the Votorantim Group, heart failure.
- Aldo Donati, 66, Italian singer, composer and television personality, cerebral hemorrhage.
- Bekir Sıtkı Erdoğan, 88, Turkish poet and songwriter.
- Eduard Giray, 65, German Olympic wrestler.
- Noël Lajoie, 86, French cyclist.
- Harold G. Maier, 77, American legal scholar.
- Douglas McCain, 33, American Islamic militant (ISIS).
- K. Mohan, 89, Indian film producer (Pasamalar).
- Merton Sandler, 88, British chemical pathologist.
- Leonid Stadnyk, 44, Ukrainian farmer, world's tallest man claimant, brain haemorrhage.
- Arthur Wade, 95, Australian politician, member of the New South Wales Legislative Assembly for Newcastle (1968–1988).
- Eduardo White, 50, Mozambican writer.
- Enrique Zileri, 83, Peruvian publisher.

=== 25 ===
- Maj-Briht Bergström-Walan, 89, Swedish psychologist.
- Anne Borsay, 59, British medical historian.
- John Brandon, 85, American actor (The Bold and the Beautiful, Dynasty, Scarface).
- Csaba Csutorás, 76, Hungarian Olympic sprinter (1960, 1964).
- William Greaves, 87, American documentary filmmaker (Symbiopsychotaxiplasm).
- Ramón Echarren Istúriz, 84, Spanish Roman Catholic prelate, Bishop of Canarias (1978–2005).
- Hildur Krog, 92, Norwegian botanist.
- Martin Magga, 60, Solomon Islander politician, MP for Temotu Pele (since 2010).
- Alfredo Martini, 93, Italian cyclist and coach (national team).
- Marcel Masse, 78, Canadian politician, MP for Frontenac (1984–1993), MNA for Montcalm (1966–1973).
- Karl Molitor, 94, Swiss alpine skier, Olympic silver and bronze medalist (1948).
- Lars Mortimer, 68, Swedish comic artist.
- Nico M. M. Nibbering, 76, Dutch chemist.
- Carla Rotolo, 73, American folk music researcher.
- Len Terry, 90, English motorsport engineer, (Lotus, BRM).
- Uziah Thompson, 78, Jamaican percussionist, heart attack.
- Bob Warren, 68, American basketball player.
- Arthur Henry White, 90, American business consultant.
- John Wu Shi-zhen, 93, Chinese Roman Catholic prelate, Archbishop of Nanchang (1990–2011).

=== 26 ===
- Christian Bourquin, 59, French politician, President of the Regional Council of Languedoc-Roussillon (since 2010), cancer.
- Carlos de la Madrid Virgen, 74, Mexican politician, Governor of Colima (1991–1997).
- Simon Featherstone, 56, British diplomat, High Commissioner to Malaysia (2010–2014), Ambassador to Switzerland and Liechtenstein (2004–2008).
- Peter Bacon Hales, 63, American historian and photographer, traffic collision.
- Darrell Lynn Judge, 79, American physicist.
- Caroline Kellett, 54, British fashion journalist.
- Sir Douglas Morpeth, 90, British accountant.
- John Joseph Nevins, 82, American Roman Catholic prelate, Bishop of Venice in Florida (1984–2007).
- Dalton Paranaguá, 87, Brazilian politician, mayor of Londrina (1969–1973).
- Jim Petrie, 82, British cartoonist (Minnie the Minx).
- Chūsei Sone, 76, Japanese film director (Angel Guts: Red Classroom), pneumonia.
- David E. Sorensen, 81, American Latter-day Saints leader.
- Bob Wilson, 88, American basketball player.
- Masakane Yonekura, 80, Japanese actor and stage director, abdominal aortic aneurysm rupture.

=== 27 ===
- Givi Agrba, 77, Abkhazian politician.
- Amadou Balaké, 70, Burkinabé singer.
- Jean-François Beltramini, 66, French footballer.
- Yehezkel Braun, 92, Israeli composer.
- Jim Briscoe, 90, English footballer.
- Al Carrell, 88, American home improvement expert and columnist, pneumonia.
- Frank Corner, 94, New Zealand diplomat.
- Roy Crimmins, 85, English jazz trombonist, composer and arranger.
- Jacques Friedel, 93, French physicist.
- Gábor Gabos, 84, Hungarian pianist.
- Jan Groth, 68, Norwegian singer (Aunt Mary, Just 4 Fun), cancer.
- Bobby Kinloch, 79, Scottish footballer (Hibernian).
- Guy Lacroix, 76, Canadian politician, heart attack.
- Herbert Lottman, 87, American biographer.
- Richard Luke, 66, Australian rules footballer (South Melbourne).
- Alfredo Chavez Marquez, 92, American federal judge.
- Jimmy Nesbitt, 79, Northern Irish police detective, investigated Shankill Butchers.
- Peret, 79, Spanish singer, guitarist and composer, lung cancer.
- Valeri Petrov, 94, Bulgarian poet, screenwriter (Yo Ho Ho), playwright and translator, stroke.
- Benno Pludra, 88, German children's author.
- Orlando Polmonari, 90, Italian Olympic gymnast (1960).
- Victor J. Stenger, 79, American physicist and author, aortic aneurysm.
- Marjorie Strider, 83, American artist.
- Sandy Wilson, 90, English composer and lyricist (The Boy Friend).
- Xia Peisu, 91, Chinese computer scientist, academician of the Chinese Academy of Sciences.

=== 28 ===
- Ali al-Sayyed, 29, Lebanese soldier, decapitated. (death announced on this date)
- France Anglade, 72, French actress.
- Margaret E. Bailey, 98, American nurse.
- Joe Bethancourt, 68, American folk musician.
- Pierre Brabant, 89, Canadian composer and pianist.
- Yondani Butt, 69, Chinese conductor (music).
- Roberto Cairo, 51, Spanish actor (Cuéntame cómo pasó), lung cancer.
- Roger Clarke, 74, Jamaican politician, Minister of Agriculture (since 2012).
- G. Bradford Cook, 77, American lawyer.
- Glenn Cornick, 67, British bassist (Jethro Tull), heart failure.
- Andrew Cray, 28, American activist and political figure, oral cancer.
- Carlos Alberto Etcheverry, 81, Argentine footballer.
- Hal Finney, 58, American cryptographer and programmer, amyotrophic lateral sclerosis.
- Mary Featherstonhaugh Frampton, 86, British civil servant.
- Hans Hoets, 93, Dutch World War II resistance fighter.
- Hal Hunter, 82, American football coach (California Vulcans).
- Ivan Ivančić, 76, Croatian Yugoslav Olympic shot putter (1972, 1976) and coach.
- Andrew Kay, 95, American computer pioneer.
- Bill Kerr, 92, South African-born Australian actor and comedian (Hancock's Half Hour).
- Jack Kraft, 93, American college basketball coach (Villanova Wildcats, Rhode Island Rams).
- Patrick le Rolland, 71, French Olympic equestrian.
- Hans Möhr, 98, Swiss Olympic equestrian (1960, 1964).
- David Murphy, 93, American CIA officer, heart failure.
- Norihiro Nakajima, 64, Japanese manga artist, colorectal cancer.
- Penelope Niven, 75, American academic and biographer, brain aneurysm.
- Alan Reynolds, 88, British artist.
- John Anthony Walker, 77, American naval officer, convicted of spying for the Soviet Union.
- Fernando Zunzunegui, 70, Spanish footballer (Real Madrid).

=== 29 ===
- Kurt Bachmann, 78, Filipino Olympic basketball player (1960).
- Jane Baker, 91, British television writer (Doctor Who, Space: 1999, Watt on Earth).
- David Bala, 67, Singaporean comedian and actor, heart disease.
- Michael Banda, 84, Sri Lankan socialist activist.
- Brasse Brännström, 69, Swedish actor (Fem myror är fler än fyra elefanter), heart attack.
- Greg Brown, 62, American painter.
- Octavio Brunetti, 39, Argentine tango pianist.
- Jesse Castete, 80, American football player.
- Shamim Farooqui, 70, Indian poet.
- Sir Jasper Hollom, 96, English banker, Chief Cashier of the Bank of England (1962–1966), Deputy Governor of the Bank of England (1970–1980).
- George L. Little, 63, American costume designer (Apocalypse Now, Jarhead, The Hurt Locker).
- Simon Akwali Okafor, 79, Nigerian Roman Catholic prelate, Bishop of Awka (1994–2010).
- Ryūko Seihō, 73, Japanese sumo wrestler and actor, heart attack.
- Eberhard Sengpiel, 73–74, German sound engineer.
- Rosella Towne, 96, American actress (Yes My Darling Daughter).
- Björn Waldegård, 70, Swedish rally driver, world champion (1979), cancer.

=== 30 ===
- Lucien Bahuma, 57, Congolese army officer, heart attack.
- Charles Bowden, 69, American writer.
- Cherlynlavaughn Bradley, 62, American chemist.
- Bipan Chandra, 86, Indian historian.
- Igor Decraene, 18, Belgian cyclist, winner of the UCI Road World Championships – Junior men's time trial (2013), hit by train.
- Shaban Demiraj, 94, Albanian albanologist and linguist.
- Philippe Gurdjian, 69, French car racing promoter (French Grand Prix) and driver (24 Hours of Le Mans).
- Mayumi Inaba, 64, Japanese writer, Tanizaki Prize recipient, pancreatic cancer.
- Shlomo Kalo, 86, Israeli writer.
- Doone Kennedy, 87, Australian politician, first female Lord Mayor of Hobart (1986–1996).
- Teodoro Luña, 75, Peruvian Olympic footballer.
- Victoria Mallory, 65, American singer and actress, pancreatic cancer.
- Kirby McCauley, 72, American literary agent, renal failure.
- Andrew V. McLaglen, 94, British film and television director (McLintock!, Gunsmoke, Rawhide).
- Sir David Mitchell, 86, British politician, MP for Basingstoke (1964–1983) and North West Hampshire (1983–1997).
- Dennis Nordfelt, 71, American politician.
- Felipe Osterling, 82, Peruvian lawyer and politician, Minister of Justice (1980–1981), Senator (1985–1992).
- Jean-Pierre Perrinelle, 65, French Olympic hurdler.
- Joseph E. Persico, 84, American writer.
- Manuel Pertegaz, 96, Spanish fashion designer.
- Bohumil Prošek, 85, Czech Olympic ice hockey player (1956).
- Jack Wayman, 92, American businessman.
- Ann Zwinger, 89, American natural history author.

=== 31 ===
- Abdul Alim, 83, Bangladeshi politician.
- Ștefan Andrei, 83, Romanian politician, Minister of Foreign Affairs (1978–1985).
- Bapu, 80, Indian film director and cartoonist, cardiac arrest.
- Yves Carcelle, 66, French businessman, kidney cancer.
- Bobbie Clarke, 74, British drummer, cancer.
- Kenneth Clarke, Australian field hockey player.
- Flip Fraser, 62, Jamaican-British journalist and playwright.
- Stan Goldberg, 82, American comic book artist (Archie), stroke.
- Josef Hrnčíř, 93, Czech conductor.
- Lajos Kiss, 80, Hungarian canoer, Olympic bronze medalist (1956).
- María Eugenia Llamas, 70, Mexican actress, cardiac arrest.
- Leon Milo, 57, American composer and musician.
- Viktor Radev, 77, Bulgarian Olympic basketball player (1956, 1960).
- Peter Stursberg, 101, Canadian writer and broadcaster.
- Carol Vadnais, 68, Canadian ice hockey player (Boston Bruins, California Golden Seals, New York Rangers), cancer.
- Jonathan Williams, 71, British racing driver.
