= Hirschi =

Hirschi is a surname. Notable people with the surname include:

- Frank W. Hirschi (1925–2014), American educator and politician
- Hans M. Hirschi (born 1967), Swedish writer and activist
- Jonathan Hirschi (born 1986), Swiss racing and rally driver
- Marc Hirschi (born 1998), Swiss cyclist
- Steve Hirschi (born 1981), Swiss ice hockey player
- Travis Hirschi (1935–2017), American sociologist
- Alexandra Mary Hirschi (born 1985), Australian social media celebrity

== See also ==
- Hirschi High School, a high school in Wichita Falls, Texas, United States
