= Hrnčíř =

Hrnčíř (feminine: Hrnčířová) is a Czech surname. Notable people with the surname include:

- Jan Hrnčíř (born 1977), Czech politician
- Josef Hrnčíř (1921–2014), Czech musician
- Kenny Hrncir (born 2001), American college football coach
