= Arthur Olsen =

Arthur Olsen may refer to:

- Ole Olsen (baseball) (Arthur Ole Olsen, 1894–1980), American baseball pitcher
- Arthur Olsen (boxer, born 1900) (1900–1951), Norwegian boxer who competed at the 1920 Olympics
- Arthur Olsen (boxer, born 1907) (1907–1943), Norwegian boxer who competed at the 1928 Olympics
- Arthur Olsen (politician) (1914–2014), American politician

== See also ==
- Arthur David Olson, founding contributor of the tz database
- Arthur Olsson (1926–2013), Swedish cross-country skier
