= Alexander Currie =

Alexander Currie may refer to:

- Alexander Monteith Currie (1926–2014), Scottish administrator of the University of Edinburgh
- George Alexander Currie (1896–1984), New Zealand scientist and university administrator
- Alex Currie (1891–1951), head coach of the Ottawa Senators
- Alexander Currie, agricultural labourer
