= Merker =

Merker is a surname. Notable people with the surname include:

- Björn Merker (born 1943), Swedish neuroscientist
- Hans-Joachim Merker (1929–2014), German physician and anatomist
- Ludwig Merker (1894–1964), German Wehrmacht general
- Paul Merker (1894–1969), German politician and activist
