= Susan Richards =

Susan Richards may refer to:

- Invisible Woman, a fictional character
- Sue Richards (artist) (1958–2014), Canadian artist
- Susan Richards Shreve, American novelist
