= Senator Hewitt =

Senator Hewitt may refer to:

- Charles J. Hewitt (1867–1940), New York State Senate
- Goldsmith W. Hewitt (1834–1895), Alabama State Senate
- Leslie R. Hewitt (1867–1936), California State Senate
- Mike Hewitt (politician) (born 1946), Washington State Senate
- Norman Hewitt (1928–2014), Connecticut State Senate
- Sharon Hewitt (born 1958), Louisiana State Senate
