= Comly =

Comly is a surname. Notable people with the surname include:

- Clem Comly (1954–2014), American baseball researcher, author, and statistician
- James M. Comly (1832–1887), American Civil War veteran, journalist, attorney, newspaper editor and owner, historian, and diplomat
