= Karen Gale =

American neuroscientist and educator

- Born: October 14, 1948; New York City, New York, U.S.
- Died: August 21, 2014 (aged 65)
- Education: High School of Music & Art; University of Michigan; University of Washington
- Years active: 1977–2014
- Employer: Georgetown University

Karen Gale (October 14, 1948 – August 21, 2014) was an American neuroscientist whose work advanced the understanding of neural mechanisms underlying epilepsy and seizures. She was known for her research on the neural circuitry related to seizure propagation, mechanisms of seizure-induced neuroprotection, and damage, as well as the effects of early life exposure to anticonvulsant drugs.

== Early life and education ==
Born in New York City, Karen Gale attended the High School of Music and Art in Manhattan, earned an undergraduate degree from University of Michigan, and a PhD in psychology from the University of Washington in 1975. After working alongside Erminio Costa at the National Institute of Mental Health, Gale joined the faculty at Georgetown University.

== Career ==
=== Research ===
Gale's 37-year career began in the field of pharmacology as an assistant professor at Georgetown University Medical Center's Department of Pharmacology in 1977, where she rose rapidly through the faculty ranks. She was instrumental in establishing and leading the Georgetown Interdisciplinary Program in Neuroscience and was a founding member of the Georgetown Women in Medicine.

One of Gale's pivotal discoveries involved identifying the basal ganglia nuclei's critical role in controlling epilepsy and elucidating the involvement of a region in the piriform cortex, which she termed "Area Tempestas," in the genesis of seizures.

Her work focused on subcortical circuitry, exploring its pharmacological manipulation and impact on behavior. Gale became known for her pioneering research on the roles of subcortical structures, including the substantia nigra, in seizure control and propagation.

In addition to epilepsy research, Gale made substantial contributions to understanding comorbidities of epilepsy, the neurobiology of Parkinsonism, and the effects of cocaine-induced hyperkinesias.

=== Scientific publishing ===
Gale published extensively, contributing 175 articles to leading scientific journals, earning the Epilepsy Research Recognition Award from the American Society of Pharmacology and Therapeutics in 1995 and the posthumous Extraordinary Contribution Award from the American Epilepsy Society.

=== Educator ===
Gale mentored and supported the growth of upcoming scientists throughout her career. She was particularly involved in advocating for trainees, early career investigators, minority scientists, and women in science. Recognizing the need for interdisciplinary approaches in understanding complex neurological conditions, Dr. Gale established the Interdisciplinary Program in Neuroscience at Georgetown University, serving as its founding director from 1994 to 2003.

Georgetown University commemorates her legacy through "The Karen Gale Memorial Lecture for Women in Neuroscience" and honored her with the prestigious Presidential Fellows Medal in October 2014.

== Awards ==
- Epilepsy Research Award from the American Society of Pharmacology and Experimental Therapeutics (1995)
- Estelle Ramey Award (2001)
- Georgetown University Faculty Senate Service Award (2014)
- Society for Neuroscience Bernice Grafstein Award for Outstanding Accomplishments in Mentoring (2014)
- American Epilepsy Society Extraordinary Contributions Award (2014)
