= Milton Moore Snodgrass =

Milton Moore Snodgrass (July 9, 1931 – August 13, 2014) was an American author.

Born July 9, 1931 in Linesville, Pennsylvania to Clifford Marshall and Anna (Moore) Snodgrass. Received Ph.D. 1956 Purdue University. Was part of the Department of Agricultural Economics and Agricultural Business, New Mexico State University, Las Cruces, New Mexico.

Snodgrass died in 2014 at Memorial Medical Center in Las Cruces.

== Works ==
- "Milton Snodgrass". JSTOR.
- Milton Moore Snodgrass; Luther T. Wallace (1970). Agriculture, economics, and growth. Appleton-Century-Crofts.
- Milton Moore Snodgrass; Luther T. Wallace (1975). Agriculture, economics, and resource management. Prentice-Hall. ISBN 978-0-13-018812-0.
