= Godwin Chepkurgor =

Godwin Kipkemoi Chepkurgor (c. 1969 – August 1, 2014) was a Kenya freelance journalist and former Nakuru city councillor. In 2000, Chepkurgor offered then U.S. President Bill Clinton a dowry of forty goats and twenty cows in exchange for Chelsea Clinton's hand in marriage.

== Marriage offer to Clinton ==
Chepkurgor originally wrote to President Clinton offering the dowry of goats and cows during Clinton's 2000 visit to Kenya. According to Muliro Telewa, a reporter for the BBC, the number of animals offered in the dowry was very generous by Kenyan standards. Chepkurgor drew worldwide attention and headlines when he publicly disclosed his offer for her hand in marriage in 2005. He told The Standard in a 2005 interview that, "Had I succeeded in wooing Chelsea, I would have had a grand wedding...I would have invited South African Anglican Archbishop Desmond Tutu to preside at the ceremony." His letter drew scrutiny from Kenyan authorities, who conducted background checks of his friends and family; he was summoned for a meeting at the Ministry of Foreign Affairs, which he declined to attend.

In 2009, another Kenyan journalist brought up the subject of the 2000 marriage proposal to then U.S. Secretary of State Hillary Clinton during a town hall meeting with reporters. After a pause, Secretary Clinton replied saying, "My daughter is her own person. I will convey this very kind offer." Chepkurgor expressed happiness that his original marriage offer had been renewed in an interview with the BBC. Chepkurgor added at the time that his first wife, Grace, "did not object" to his proposal to Chelsea Clinton.

== Personal life ==
On December 2, 2006, he married his wife and college classmate, Grace Chepkurgor, at a ceremony held at the Kabarak University Chapel in Nakuru. The couple had four children.

== Death ==
Godwin Chepkurgor was killed in an elephant attack on August 1, 2014, while on assignment for the Kass Weekly magazine. Chepkurgor was in Ol-debes village, Mogotio, Baringo County, covering the story of a herd of African elephants which had been bothering local communities. Kenya Wildlife Service officers were finally able to drive the elephants away to rescue Chepkurgor. He was taken to Rift Valley General Hospital in Nakuru where he died from his injuries at the age of 45. He was survived by his wife and four children.
