= Jan Hrnčíř =

Czech economist and politician

Jan Hrnčíř MP
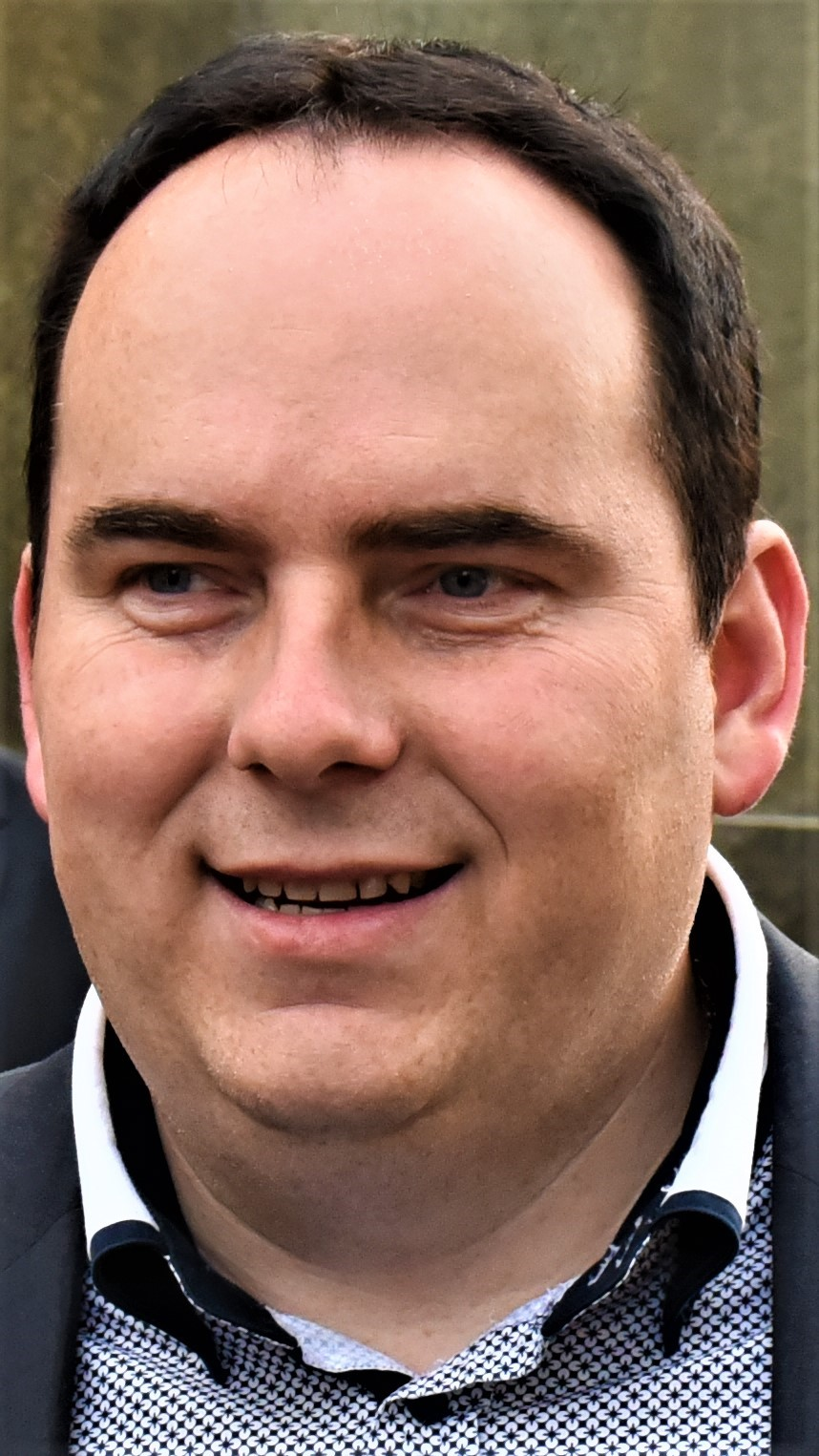

Member of the Chamber of Deputies
- Incumbent
- Assumed office 21 October 2017

Personal details
- Born: 1 May 1977 (age 48) Ivančice, Czech Republic
- Party: TOP 09 (2010–2014); Dawn of Direct Democracy (2014–2015); Freedom and Direct Democracy (2015–present)

Jan Hrnčíř (born 1 May 1977) is a Czech economist and politician.

== Education ==
Hrnčíř has a degree in economics (Ing.) from the Pan-European University in Bratislava, and a doctorate (PhDr.) in ethics from the University of International Business in Prešov. He subsequently worked as a teacher of economics and business management.

== Political career ==
Hrnčíř began his political career in TOP 09, and was a member of the party board on Blansko City Council. In 2014, he joined Dawn of Direct Democracy, and unsuccessfully ran for the party in the 2014 municipal elections in Blansko. During the 2014 European Parliament election, he ran for Dawn again, but was not elected. He later joined Freedom and Direct Democracy (SPD), and was elected to the City Council. In the 2017 Czech parliamentary election he was elected to the Chamber of Deputies for SPD, representing the South Moravian Region. He is also SPD's chairman in South Moravia.
