= Emilia Castro de Barish =

Emilia Castro de Barish (27 April 1916 – 17 August 2014) was a Costa Rican diplomat. She was the first woman to be appointed a career Ambassador in the Costa Rican diplomatic service and, for many years, she was the dean of the foreign service.

Daughter of Rafael Castro Quesada, Secretary for Foreign Affairs of Costa Rica from 1928 to 1929, the then Ms. Castro entered the Costa Rican Foreign Service in 1948 when she was appointed to the Embassy of Costa Rica to the United States, in Washington, D.C. In 1949 she left the diplomatic service to marry Frederik I. Barish. On 20 November 1956, she was seriously injured in an airplane crash. Her husband, who was flying the aircraft, died and their two small children were also injured.

De Barish re-entered the Costa Rican foreign service in May 1957 and was appointed first secretary to the Permanent Mission of Costa Rica to the United Nations. On 1970 she has promoted to Minister Counselor and, on 1981, she was promoted to the rank of Ambassador. By the time she retired, on 1999, she was the diplomat who had been accredited the longest continuous time to the United Nations.

Ambassador de Barish was the Rapporteaur of the United Nations Host Country Committee from 1978 to 1999; and, from 1970 to 1971, she was vice-chairman of the Third (Human Rights) Committee of the United Nations General Assembly. Being an expert on International Human Rights, she was a key promoter of the United Nations programme of action on a Culture of Peace. and she was instrumental to the establishment of the Office of the United Nations High Commissioner for Human Rights. As Keys notes:

Efforts to strengthen the UN`s (Human Rights') implementing machinery have generally met with defeat. A prime indicator has been the fate of the Costa Rica proposal to establish a High Commissioner for Human Rights, who would act as a sort of "ombudsman" quietly taking erring governments to task and threatening publicity and public pressure if they do not improve. This proposal has been subjected to the wildest kind of distortion and ridicule. Only the most patient and devoted efforts of Emilia Castro de Barish from the Costa Rica have kept the High Commissioner proposal on the UN Agenda.

Ambassador de Barish received a B.S. in social science from the University of California, Los Angeles, UCLA. She died in August 2014 at the age of 98.
