= Syed Rahim =

Indian cricketer (1929–2014)

Personal information
- Full name: Sted Abrul Rahim
- Born: 14 July 1929; Nagpur, India
- Died: 7 August 2014 (aged 85); Nagpur, India
- Source: Cricinfo, 12 April 2016

Syed Rahim (14 July 1929 – 7 August 2014) was an Indian cricketer. He played first-class cricket for Madhya Pradesh and Vidarbha between 1946 and 1966.
