= Willy Schwarz =

German physician (1906–1982)

Willy Schwarz (born 8 December 1906 in Göttingen, died 1982) was a German physician and anatomist.

== Career ==
He obtained his Habilitation in 1937, and taught at the University of Jena and the University of Königsberg prior to 1945.

From 1949, he was employed at the Free University of Berlin, as Adjunct Professor (apl. Professor) 1949–1951, as Professor Extraordinarius (ao. Professor) 1951–1966 and as Professor Ordinarius from 1966. He was Director of the Research Department for Electron Microscopy and of the Institute for Anatomy.

He held the second chair in anatomy at the Free University of Berlin from 1966 to 1976.

== Selected publications ==
- Elektronenmikroskopische Untersuchungen über die Differenzierung der cornea-und Sklerafibrillen des Menschen, Zeitschrift für Zellforschung und Mikroskopische Anatomie, 1953, Volume 38, Issue 1, pp 78–86
- Elektronenmikroskopische Untersuchungen über den Aufbau der Sklera und der Cornea des Menschen, Zeitschrift für Zellforschung und Mikroskopische Anatomie, 1953, Volume 38, Issue 1, pp 26–49
- Elektronenmikroskopische Untersuchungen an der Interzellularsubstanz des menschlichen Knochengewebes, Zeitschrift für Zellforschung und Mikroskopische Anatomie, 1953, Volume 38, Issue 5, pp 475–487
- Die Hodenzwischenzellen der Ratte nach Hypophysektomie und nach Behandlung mit Choriongonadotropin und Amphenon B, Zeitschrift für Zellforschung und Mikroskopische Anatomie, 1964, Volume 65, Issue 2, pp 272–284
