= Steve Brook =

Australian writer

Steve Brook (1 August 1934 – 13 August 2014) was a British-born Australian satirical writer with a history of involvement in progressive causes, following a period as a journalist with Polish Radio in Warsaw.

Brook was born in London, England and trained as a compositor in Sydney, Australia before moving to Melbourne.

Owing to his literary and historical talents, his writing, journalism, and biographical reflection is a significant source of documentation of the Jewish left in Australia and its international connections from outside academia and from the point of view of a non-ideological, humanist insider.

He had a Master of Arts from Monash University in Melbourne.

His account of time spent with the English language service of Polish Radio (1966-1974) is a sympathetic, but not uncritical look at Poland under Soviet hegemony where there were attempts to have 'socialism with a human face', as well as the Polish cultural scene in the 1960s and 1970s and the political use of anti-Semitism in Poland. Additionally, he was a journalist at 3CR radio in Melbourne in the 1970s when there were strong political differences between left factions, including the influence of local Maoists.

He was also a key member of the Australian Jewish Democratic Society (AJDS), a progressive Australian organisation with roots going back to the pre-World War 2 left. His published writing, journalism, and frequent letters to the editor are an important source of otherwise undocumented political and social history of the Melbourne Left. In addition, he wrote frequent letters to the editor to the Australian Jewish News and the Newsletter of AJDS on Israel/Palestine issues.

In all his work he expressed a deep mistrust of official propaganda whether from the Left or the Right.

In "Strawberries with Everything" he said that this was why he went to live in Warsaw, "behind the Iron Curtain", to discover for himself the degree of truth in anticommunism and its accompanying propaganda, which painted life in those parts as a kind of hell on earth.

Communist propaganda was, of course, a mirror image of this. He says the reality was a bit of both—neither devils nor angels, but real people scarred and traumatised by the most horrific war in modern history which led to their political choices in the face of crisis, including communism in preference to the perception of continuing Fascism and Nazism during the Cold War. This factor, said Brook, is almost deliberately ignored in studies of the Soviet bloc.

== Bibliography ==
Year	Title	Publisher	ISBN
2011	Death By Teatowel	Rawprawn Publishing	9780646555089
2009	Now Hit Enter: A Cyberspace Fantasy	Rawprawn Publishing	9780646508115
2009	For Sam : A Fantasy in Three Acts	Rawprawn Publishing	9780646508054
2005	Strawberries With Everything : A Polish Odyssey 1966-1974	Rawprawn Publishing	0646450042
2004	Bali Sugar : A Tale of Tropical Love, God and Politicking	Rawprawn Publishing	064643764X
2003	McQuail: A Likely Story	Rawprawn Publishing	064642517X
1981	Poland Under Pressure	Red Pen Publications	0909913579
