= Donald A. Beattie =

American scientist and government official (1929–2014)

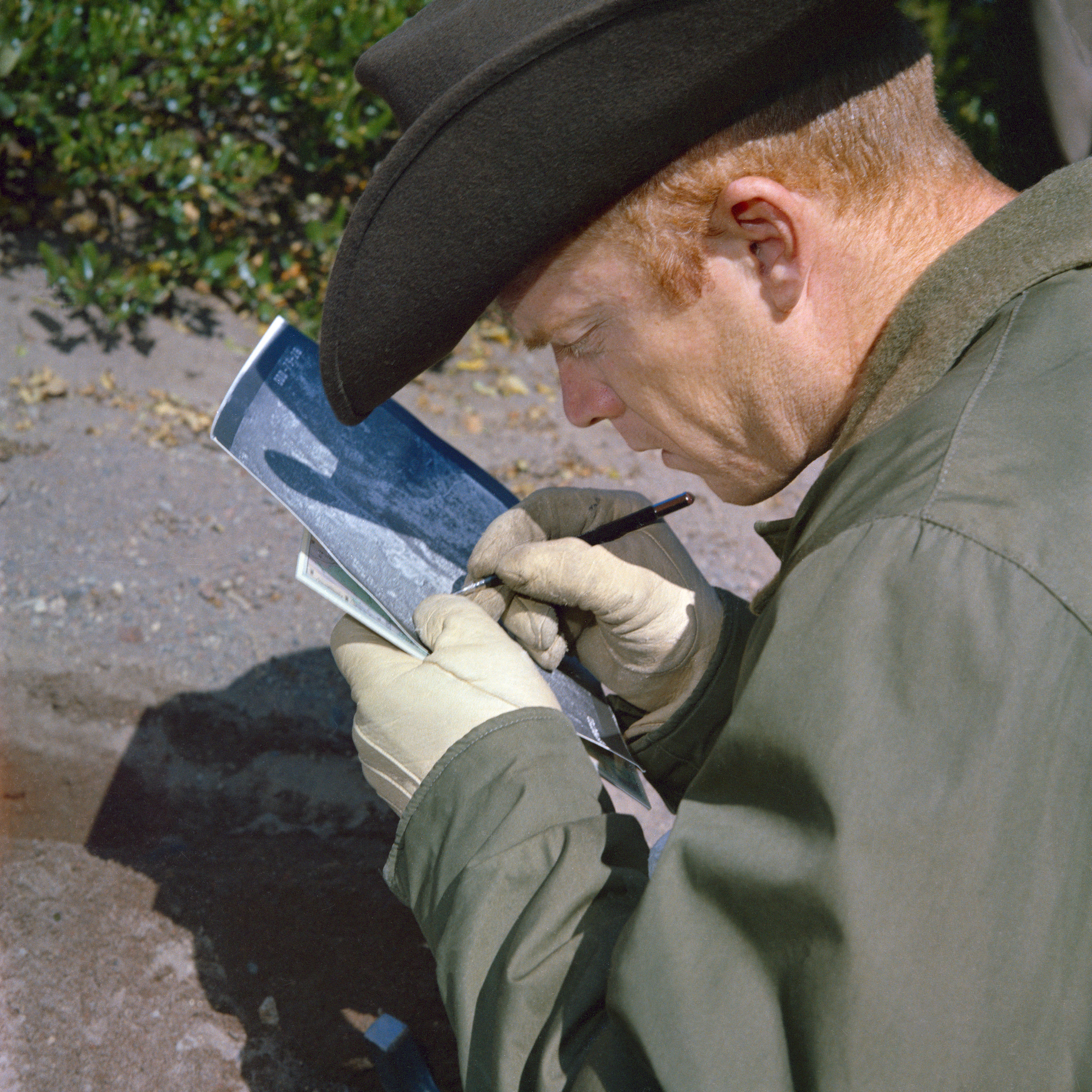
- Born: October 30, 1929; New York City, US
- Died: August 22, 2014 (aged 84); Jacksonville, Florida, US
- Education: Columbia University (B.S., 1951); Colorado School of Mines (M.S., 1958)
- Known for: Management of Apollo lunar surface scientific exploration experiments Author of Taking Science to the Moon and History of Next

Donald A. Beattie (October 30, 1929 – August 22, 2014) was an American aerospace scientist and former government official who was the Acting Assistant Secretary for Conservation and Solar Applications in the United States Department of Energy from 1977 to 1978. He also served as Assistant Administrator of the Energy Research and Development Administration and Director of the Energy Systems Division of NASA.

== Biography ==
Donald A. Beattie was born to James Francis and Evelyn Margaret (Hickey) Beattie on October 30, 1929, in Staten Island, New York. He attended Columbia College on a NROTC scholarship. After graduating from Columbia in 1951, Beattie went on to serve as a pilot in the U.S. Navy from 1951 to 1956. He remained in Ready Reserve squadrons until 1967.

After leaving the military, he returned to graduate school at the Colorado School of Mines, receiving a M.S. degree in 1958. Beattie went to work for Mobil Oil Co., supervising a field party mapping Mobil's oil concessions in Colombia. While working in Colombia, he learned that NASA was recruiting geologists to help plan the Apollo lunar exploration. He was accepted a job at NASA and began work in September 1963, participating in the planning of Apollo and post-Apollo missions.

After the end of the Apollo program, Beattie transferred to the National Science Foundation, where he was appointed Director of the Advanced Energy Research and Technology Division, working on solar and geothermal research and development programs.

In 1975, he became the Deputy Assistant Administrator, and later the Assistant Administrator for Solar, Geothermal and Advanced Energy Systems at the newly established Energy Research and Development Administration.

On September 28, 1977, Secretary of Energy James R. Schlesinger appointed Beattie to serve as Acting Assistant Secretary for Conservation and Solar Applications. He assumed the position in October 1977 and served in that role until August 1978 when President Carter's nominee, Omi Walden, for the position was finally approved. However, his appointment was also challenged by the Government Accountability Office because his post would require United States Senate confirmation.

In 1978, he returned to NASA as Director of the Energy Systems Division. He left in 1983 in order to join BDM International as Vice President of Houston Operations. Beattie established his own consulting business in 1984 and served as President of Endosat Inc. from 1991 to 1996.

== Personal life ==
Beattie and his wife had two sons. He died on August 22, 2014, in St. Johns, Florida.
