= Cherlynlavaughn Bradley =

Scientist

Cherlyn Bradley
- Born: Cherlynlavaughn Bradley; October 27, 1951; Chicago
- Died: August 30, 2014 (aged 62)
- Education: Northwestern University (PhD); Illinois Wesleyan University (BS)
- Scientific career
- Workplaces: Amoco

Cherlynlavaughn Bradley (October 27, 1951 – August 30, 2014) was an American chemist who worked at Amoco.

== Early life and education ==
Bradley was born in Chicago, Illinois. Her father, Leroy Bradley, worked at Burlington Railroad and her mother, Geneva Bradley, was a musician. Bradley attended St Matthew's Catholic School and became interested in science when she was given a Gilbert Chemistry set. She took a course in advanced placement chemistry and went on to study chemistry and Illinois Wesleyan University. She was the only African-American student and graduated magna cum laude in 1973, and went on to study inorganic chemistry at graduate school. At Northwestern University, Bradley was, again, the only African-American woman in the department. She worked on polymer semiconductors and linear permethylpolysilanes. She earned her PhD in 1978.

== Research and career ==
Bradley joined Standard Oil in 1977, which later became Amoco. She worked on elemental detection for sulfur compounds. She was nominated to join the American Society for Testing and Materials and led the gas chromatography study group. The group included Amoco, Royal Dutch Shell, Chevron Corporation, Mobil and Marathon Oil. She was likely the only African-American woman with a PhD to work at Amoco, and made efforts to mentor young women.

She developed a Microwave plasma gas chromatography detector that could detect trace elements. She worked with Hewlett-Packard to develop a small version of the equipment. She was recognised for her ability to determine polymer contaminants. She was a member of the American Chemical Society's Project SEED, an organisation that brought students from economically disadvantaged background to Amoco for the summer. She mentored girls for the Girl Scouts of the USA chemistry award. Bradley was a member of the American Chemical Society's Women Chemists committee. She died after a short illness on August 30, 2014.
