= Khalil Morsi =

Egyptian actor (1946-2014)

- Born: 21 September 1946
- Died: 5 August 2014 (aged 67)
- Occupation: Actor

Khalil Morsi (21 September 1946 – 5 August 2014) was an Egyptian actor.

== Professional career ==
Among other roles, he starred in a stage adaptation of The Tragedy of Halaj, a novel by Salah Abdel Sabour.
