= Khayelihle Mathaba =

South African royal and politician

Khayelihle Mathaba was a South African royal and politician. He was a KwaZulu-Natal MLA and the chieftain of the eMacambini.

He died in a traffic collision on August 9, 2014.
