= Eduardo White =

Mozambican writer

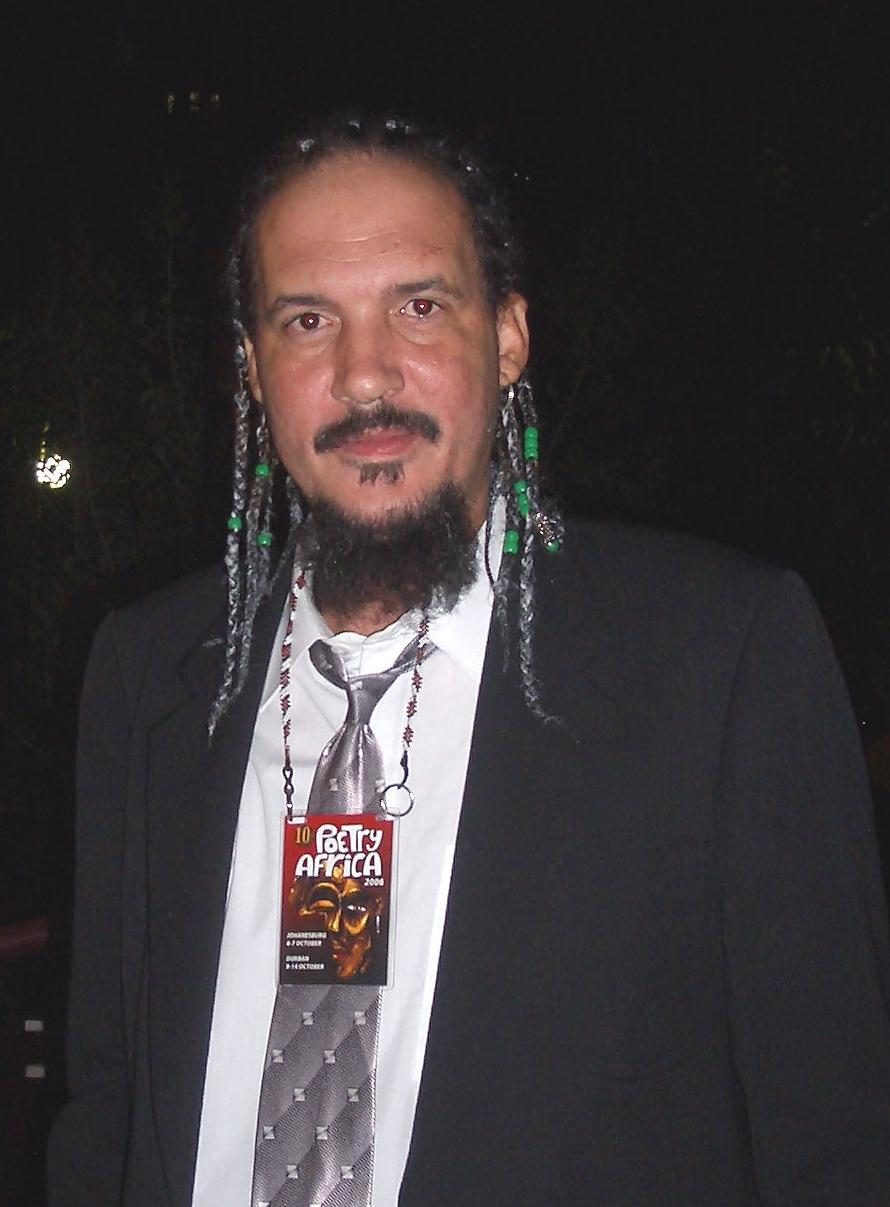
Eduardo White (2006)

Eduardo Costley White (Quelimane, 21 November 1963 - 24 August 2014) was a Mozambican writer.

His mother came from Lisbon and his father's father was English. He studied at the Instituto Industrial for three years and in 1984, he founded the magazine Charrua. He was a member of Associação dos Escritores Moçambicanos (AEMO).

== Works ==
- Amar Sobre o Índico, Associação dos Escritores Moçambicanos, 1984.
- Homoíne, Associação dos Escritores Moçambicanos, 1987.
- O País de Mim, Associação dos Escritores Moçambicanos, 1989. ( Prémio Gazeta de Artes e Letras da Revista Tempo).
- Poemas da Ciência de Voar e da Engenharia de Ser Ave, Editorial Caminho, 1992 (Prémio Nacional de Poesia Moçambicana 1995).
- Os Materiais de Amor seguido de Desafio à Tristeza, Maputo, Ndjira / Lisboa, Ed. Caminho, 1996.
- Janela para Oriente, Ed. Caminho, 1999.
- Dormir Com Deus e Um Navio na Língua, Braga, Ed. Labirinto, 2001 (Prémio Consagração Rui de Noronha).
- As Falas do Escorpião, Maputo, Imprensa Universitária, 2002.
- O Manual das Mãos, Campo das Letras, 2004.
- O Homem a Sombra e a Flor e Algumas Cartas do Interior, Maputo, Imprensa Universitária, 2004.
- Até Amanhã, Coração, Maputo, Vertical, 2005.
- Translations by the Poetry Translation Centre.
