= Jaime Giraldo Ángel =

Colombian attorney and psychologist

Jaime Giraldo Ángel (September 15, 1929 – August 23, 2014) was a Colombian attorney and psychologist. He served as Minister of Justice from August 7, 1990, until August 7, 1991, under former President César Gaviria.

Jaime Giraldo Ángel died in Cota, Cundinamarca, on August 23, 2014, at the age of 84.
