= Tom Veen =

Dutch politician

Member of the States of Gelderland
- In office 5 June 1974 – 1981

Member of the Senate
- In office 18 September 1979 – 13 September 1983

Personal details
- Born: 14 January 1942 Ambarawa, Dutch East Indies
- Died: 13 August 2014 (aged 72) Viterbo, Italy
- Party: People's Party for Freedom and Democracy
- Education: University of Amsterdam, University of Groningen

Tom Robert Adrie Veen (14 January 1942 – 13 August 2014) was a Dutch politician. He was a member of the States of Gelderland between 1974 and 1981 and of the Senate of the Netherlands between 1979 and 1983 for the People's Party for Freedom and Democracy.

== Career ==
Veen was born in Ambarawa, Dutch East Indies, shortly before the Japanese occupation. Veen went to the Netherlands and studied economy at the University of Amsterdam until 1960. He followed this with advanced studies of urban planning and economy at the University of Amsterdam and the University of Groningen. After his education, Veen was a teacher of evening classes and subsequently a lecturer of urban planning. Veen later owned an urban planning company.

In 1974, Veen was elected to the States of Gelderland for the People's Party for Freedom and Democracy. Two years later, he became the parliamentary group leader there. In 1977, he was elected with preferential votes to the Senate but he did not take up his seat as it was against party policy to be elected with preferential votes. Two years later, he did become member of the Senate, where he was tasked with economic affairs, agriculture, fishery and finance. He stayed on until 1983. Two years earlier, in 1981, he had already left the States of Gelderland.

Veen died on 13 August 2014 in Viterbo, Italy.
