= Bill Pickering (swimmer) =

English swimmer and vegetarian

- Born: 19 July 1921; Overseal, Derbyshire
- Died: 17 August 2014 (aged 93); Burton on Trent
- Occupation: Swimmer
- Spouse: Clarrie Pickering

Bill Pickering (19 July 1921 – 17 August 2014) was an English swimmer known for long-distance open water swimming. He attributed his swimming success to a vegetarian way of living.

== Biography ==
Pickering was born in Overseal, Derbyshire and moved to Bloxwich in the 1950s to work as a baths manager. In August 1954, Pickering won the Morecambe Cross Bay Championship and was the only competitor to cross the finishing line. He trained on honey, raisins and a black current drink.

In August 1955 he obtained a World Record for the 21-mile England to France crossing in 14 hours and 6 minutes, beating Florence Chadwick's fastest time record. He was 1 hour 28 minutes faster than any other man. In regard to his record, Pickering commented "I could not have done it if I had not been a vegetarian". Pickering's vegetarian diet consisted of dairy products, fruits, grains, honey and vegetables. He stated that he swam the channel on two cheese sandwiches and a glass of milk and it is not necessary to eat meat to maintain health. Pickering stated that during training he eats four to five pounds of honey per week and drinks two pints of milk a day. In 1958, he swam the Firth of Forth.

In 1967, Pickering was the first man to make a direct crossing of the Wash, the 21 mile stretch from Butterwick to Snettisham beach in seven hours and 41 minutes. In 1969, he gained a new swimming record for crossing the Penarth to Weston-super-Mare Bristol Channel in 6 hours 20 minutes. Pickering became the first man to swim the Bristol Channel both ways in 1970.

His trainer was Lewis Latham. He was a vice president of the Channel Swimming Association. Pickering retired in 1986 and moved back to Overseal.

== Personal life ==
Pickering became a vegetarian at the age of 17 and remained one for the rest of his life. He was a member of the Vegetarian Cycling and Athletic Club. He was guest of honour at the first annual dinner of Preston Vegetarian and Food Reform Society in 1957. In 1973, he was President of the Birmingham and West Midland Vegetarian Society. In August 2005 he delivered a talk for the Shropshire Vegans and Veggies group.

He married Clarrie in 1941, they had no children. He died at Queen Elizabeth Hospital in Burton on Trent, aged 93.
