= Richard Newman (Australian cricketer) =

Australian cricketer

Personal information
- Born: 9 August 1924; Brunswick, Victoria, Australia
- Died: 3 August 2014 (aged 89)

Domestic team information
- Years: Team
- 1951-1953: Tasmania
- Source: Cricinfo, 9 March 2016

Richard "Dick" Newman (9 August 1924 – 3 August 2014) was an Australian cricketer. He played four first-class matches for Tasmania between 1951 and 1953.

== See also ==
- List of Tasmanian representative cricketers
