= Stella K. Hershan =

Austrian-American novelist

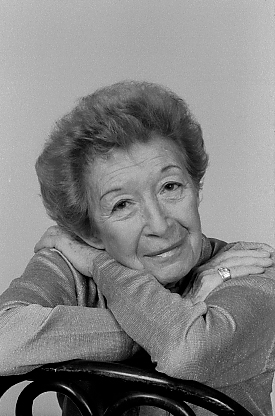
- Stella K. Hershan
- Born: February 7, 1915; Vienna, Austria
- Died: August 22, 2014 (aged 99); New York City
- Education: New York University; New School for Social Research
- Occupation: Writer
- Spouse: Rudolph Hershan
- Children: 1
- Parents: Felix Kreidl; Lucy Pick Kreidl

Stella K. Hershan (1915 – 2014) was an Austrian-American novelist and biographer who immigrated to the United States in 1939 as a refugee from the Holocaust. Among her published works are two about Eleanor Roosevelt: A Woman of Quality and The Candles She Lit: The Legacy of Eleanor Roosevelt.

Hershan, born in Vienna, was the daughter of Felix Kreidl, a businessman, and Lucy Pick Kreidl. She married Rudolph Hershan, an engineer, in 1933. She graduated from New York University with a certificate in general education in 1962 and from the New School for Social Research with a certificate in human relations in 1968.

The Hershans had one child, a daughter, Lisa. Preceded in death by her husband, Hershan died in 2014 in New York City.

== Bibliography ==
=== Biography ===
- A Woman of Quality, (1970)
- The Candles She Lit: The Legacy of Eleanor Roosevelt (1993)
- Emigration, Emigration : Exilgeschichten (in German) (2004)
- Erinnerungen Zwischen Zwei Welten : Exilerzählungen = Memories Between Two Worlds (in German) (2006)

=== Novels ===
- The Naked Angel : A Novel about the Times of Metternich and Napoleon (1973)
- The Maiden of Kosovo (2003)
- In Freundschaft, Elisabeth : Roman (in German) (1992)
- Ein Kind der Revolution: Roman (in German) (1992)

Hershan also contributed to journals in the United States and Austria.
