= Hans-Joachim Merker =

Professor Dr.med. Hans-Joachim Merker
- Born: 7 October 1929; Merseburg
- Died: 18 August 2014 (aged 84); Berlin
- Education: Free University of Berlin
- Occupations: Physician and anatomist
- Employer: Free University of Berlin

Hans-Joachim Merker (7 October 1929 – 18 August 2014) was a German physician and anatomist. He was Professor of Anatomy at the Free University of Berlin from 1972 to 1998, and served as Dean of the Faculty of Medicine from 1980 to 1981. He was noted for his research on the fine structure of connective tissue, the morphology of hormone effects, and embryological and embryotoxic problems, and his research was central in the development of medical research utilising electron microscopy. Hans Georg Baumgarten noted on his death that he was "not only a chair-holder, but a philosopher, humanist, anthropologist, developmental biologist, transdisciplinary scholar and scientist".

== Background and education ==
Merker was born in Merseburg, the son of a general practitioner. The Russian occupation saw his father thrown in jail by the communists, and as a son of an academic, he was banned from studying at universities in the Russian occupation zone. In December 1948, at 19, he enrolled as one of the first students at the newly established Free University of Berlin, which was founded in the same month with American support in West Berlin in response to the suppression of academic freedom by the communists at the Humboldt University. He initially studied art history and archeology, as the Free University did not yet have a preclinical medical programme. He started his studies of medicine in 1950 and settled permanently in West Berlin before the construction of the Berlin Wall, after which he did not see his parents for many years. He stayed for his entire career with the Free University, which he would later describe as "an island of freedom."

== Career ==
Merker graduated as a physician at the Free University of Berlin in 1956. In 1957, he was employed at the Research Department of Electron Microscopy, which was headed by Willy Schwarz, at the Institute of Anatomy at the Free University of Berlin. He obtained his doctorate (Dr.med.) in 1958 and his Habilitation in 1964, and was appointed as Adjunct Professor (außerplanmäßiger Professor) at the Free University of Berlin in 1968. In 1969, he became director of the Research Department of Electron Microscopy. He held the first chair in anatomy from 1972 to 1998, in succession to Ernst von Herrath. He also served as Dean of the Faculty of Medicine from 1980 to 1981, and was director of the Institute of Anatomy until 1998. He was a visiting scholar for one year at the Weizmann Institute of Science in Israel in 1965, and was subsequently a visiting scholar at universities in England and Sweden. He wrote more than 250 scientific papers. He became Professor Emeritus in 1998, and died in Berlin in 2014.

== Selected publications ==
- Risk assessment of prenatally – induced adverse health effects. (with Neubert, Kavlock, and Klein, eds.), Springer – Verlag, Berlin et al., 1992.
- Anatomie für Anästhesisten, Blackwell – Wissenschaften, Berlin, 1990, ISBN 978-3894121013
- Elektronenmikroskopischer Atlas, Blackwell – Wissenschaft, Berlin, 1989, ISBN 978-3894120542
- Anatomie für medizinische Hilfsberufe, Walter de Gruyter, Berlin, 1989.
- Teratology of the limbs (co-editor), Walter de Gruyter – Verlag, Berlin, 1981.
- Culture techniques (with Neubert, eds.), Walter de Gruyter– Verlag, Berlin, 1981.
- Methods in prenatal toxicology (with Neubert and Kwasigroch, eds.), G. Thieme, Stuttgart, 1977.
