= Jim Briscoe =

English footballer, manager, and club founder

Jimmy Briscoe
Personal information
- Date of birth: 14 October 1923
- Place of birth: Swinton, England
- Date of death: 27 August 2014 (aged 90)
- Position: Centre forward

Youth career
- Sheffield Wednesday

Senior career*
| Years | Team | Apps | (Gls) |
| 1946–1947 | Sheffield Wednesday | 5 | (3) |
- Gainsborough Trinity
| 1948–1953 | Ramsgate | | |
| 1953–1958 | Margate | | |

Managerial career
- 1968–1970: Stevenage Athletic
- * Club domestic league appearances and goals

James Patrick Briscoe (14 October 1923 – 27 August 2014) was a professional footballer, manager and one of the founding members of Stevenage F.C.

== Biography ==
Born in Swinton, West Riding of Yorkshire, Briscoe came through the youth team at Sheffield Wednesday. A centre forward, he scored three goals in five league appearances during the 1946–47 season, but left to join non-League Gainsborough Trinity. He later moved to Kent, playing for Ramsgate and Margate, where he broke the goalscoring record for the Kent League.

In 1968 he became manager of the newly formed Stevenage Athletic, and would remain in charge until October 1970.
