= Anne Borsay =

British medical historian

Anne Borsay (20 October 1954 – 25 August 2014) was a medical historian. She was appointed as the first Chair of Medical Humanities at Swansea University in 2003, a position she held until her death in 2014. Her academic work explored the history of medical institutions and, later, the role of disabled people in the coal industry in south Wales.

Borsay was described by a colleague as 'a pioneer of disability history, contributing a huge wealth of ideas and studies to what is now a flourishing field of history. Her work looked at changes in social, cultural and political attitudes towards disability, bringing out the importance of recording the often-ignored place of disabled people within history.'

== Education ==
Borsay studied at the University of Wales, Swansea and graduated in 1976 with a first class honours degree in Social Administration and Politics. She later gained a Master of Letters after studying at Oxford University, and subsequently (in 1999) a PhD at the University of Wales.

== Career ==
Between 1978 and 2002 Borsay worked as a Lecturer, then Senior Lecturer and Reader at the University of Wales Lampeter. She then returned to Swansea University, where she had studied for her undergraduate degree, to take up a chair in Healthcare and Medical Humanities. She held this post until her death in 2014. Borsay was one of the founders of Swansea's Research Group for Health, History and Culture, which brought together scholars in Arts and Humanities, Medicine and Health Sciences to advance research in Medical Humanities.

Borsay sat on the editorial board of the journal Disability and Society and was a member of the Wellcome Trust's Medical History and Humanities Funding Committee.

=== Publications ===
Her thesis 'Patrons and governors: aspects of the social history of the Bath infirmary, c. 1739-1830' formed the basis of her book Medicine and Charity in Georgian Bath (1999), described as an 'exhaustive' study of Bath General Infirmary which 'shone light onto the social structures of voluntary hospitals'. Borsay wrote Disability and Social Policy in Britain since 1750: a History of Exclusion, an expansive exploration of the lives of disabled people in Britain. The book was largely well received although its lack of primary sources was noted as a weakness. She also wrote numerous single and co-authored articles and chapters on the history of hospitals and nursing, including editing the collection Nursing and Midwifery in Britain since 1700 (2012) with Billie Hunter.

== Personal life ==
Anne Borsay, née Howard, was born in Norwich, UK, on 20 October 1954 and died on 25 August 2014. She was married to Peter in 1980, with whom she had two daughters, Clare and Sarah.

== Selected publications ==
- Disabled People in the Community: a Study of Housing, Health and Welfare Services (1986)
- Medicine and Charity in Georgian Bath (1999)
- Disability and Social Policy in Britain since 1750: A History of Exclusion (2005)
- Medical Records for the South Wales Coalfield, c.1890-1948, with Sara Knight (2007)
- Disabled Children: Contested Caring, 1850-1979, edited with Pamela Dale (2012)
- Nursing and midwifery in Britain since 1700 edited by Anne Borsay and Billie Hunter.
- See National Library of Wales for a longer list

=== Major grants held ===
5-year Wellcome Trust-funded study: Disability and Industrial Society: A Comparative Cultural History of British Coalfields, 1780-1948.
