= Dorothy Schwieder =

American historian, biographer, and academic

Dorothy Schwieder (November 28, 1933 – August 13, 2014) was an American historian, biographer, and academic. She joined the faculty of Iowa State University in 1966, becoming the first woman to be appointed as a professor in the Department of History. Schwieder authored a memoir and biography the late U.S. Senator George McGovern, her former college professor. A native of South Dakota, much of her research and writings focused on the history of Iowa, including the state's Amish communities.

== Biography ==
Schwieder was born Dorothy Hubbard on November 28, 1933, in Presho, South Dakota, where she was also raised. She was the ninth of her family's ten children. She married Elmer Schwieder (September 6, 1925 – December 25, 2005) in 1955, with whom she had two children, Diane Schwieder Risius and David Schwieder. Elmer Schwieder was a professor of sociology at Iowa State University.

In 1954, she received her B.A. in psychology and history from Dakota Wesleyan University, where she studied under then-professor, George McGovern. She began her graduate studies in 1964 at Iowa State University, where she obtained her M.A. in history in 1968. Scwieder completed her doctorate in history from the University of Iowa in 1981.

Schwieder joined Dakota Wesleyan University in 1960 as a part-time instructor. She then became a part-time professor at Iowa State University in 1966. Dorothy Schwieder became the first female appointed professor within the Department of History. She was also the history department's only, full-time female professor for nearly twenty years. She retired in 2001.

Schwieder died on August 13, 2014, in Ames, Iowa, at the age of 80. Her funeral was held at the Collegiate United Methodist Church at Iowa State University.

== Publications ==
Schwieder books and papers, much of which focused on the history of Iowa included Iowa's Coal Mining Heritage (1973), A Peculiar People: Iowa's Old Order Amish (1975), Black Diamonds: Life and Work in Iowa's Coal Mining Community (1983), Seventy-five Years of Service: Cooperative Extension in Iowa (1992), Iowa: the Middle Land (1996), and Growing Up With the Town: Family and Community on the Great Plains (2002). She and Gretchen Van Houten co-edited Sesquicentennial History of Iowa State University: Tradition and Transformation, a history of ISU published in 2007.

== Awards and honors ==
In the fall of 2013, Schwieder was awarded the Distinguished Alumni Award from the College of Leadership and Public Service by Dakota Wesleyan University.
