= Metakse =

Armenian writer, translator and activist

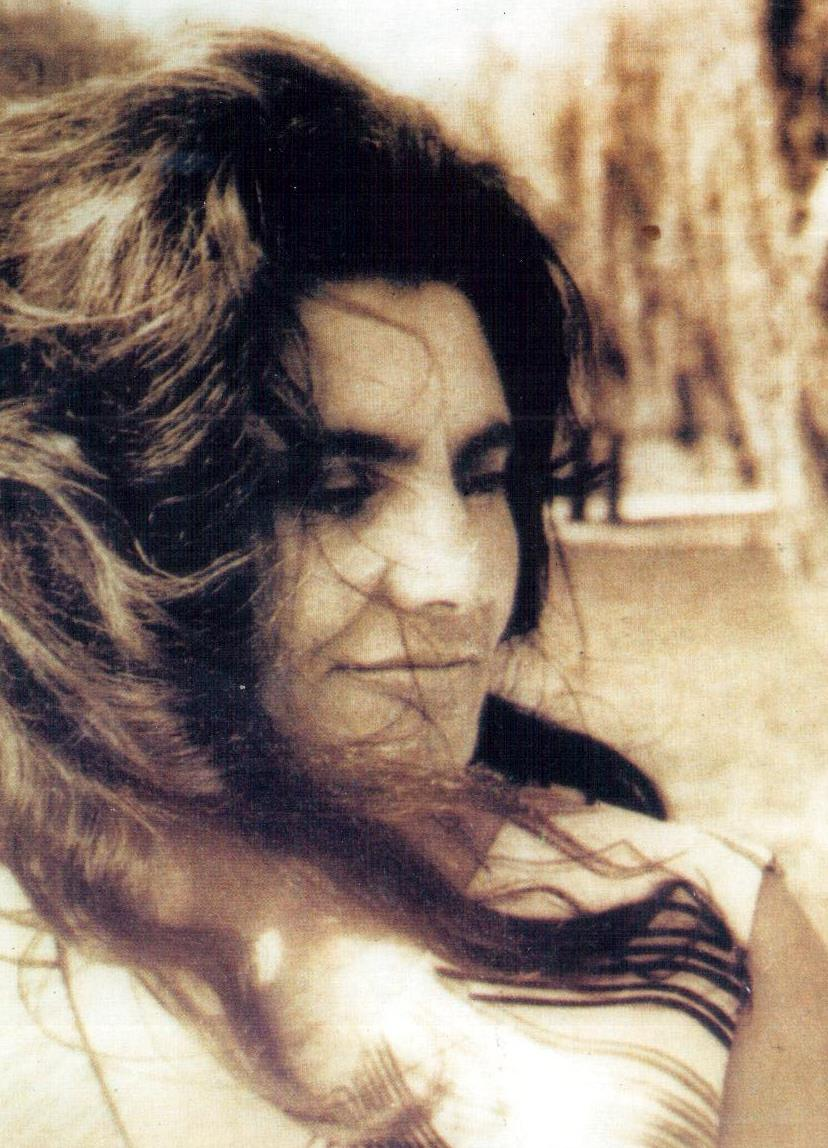
- Born: Metakse Poghosian; December 23, 1926; Artik, Shirak Province
- Died: August 10, 2014 (aged 87); Yerevan
- Occupations: poet, writer, translator and public activist
- Known for: Member of the Advisory Board of the Writers Union of Armenia

Metakse or Metakse Poghosian (Armenian: Մետաքսե (Մետաքսե Պողոսյան), December 23, 1926 – August 10, 2014, Yerevan) was an Armenian poet, writer, translator and public activist. She was a member of the Advisory Board of the Writers Union of Armenia.

== Biography ==
Born in Artik, Metakse authored many popular books including poem collections (Youth, Female Heart, and A Conversation with the World). In 2006 she published The Woman of the Fate, an anthology of her selected works. Her poetry has been translated into English, French, Japanese, Bulgarian, Serbian, Spanish and other languages by Bella Akhmadulina, Desanka Maksimović, Diana Der Hovanessian and others. After the 1988 Armenian earthquake she became the vice-president of "Motherhood" benevolent fund, supporting female members of the Armenian Army during the First Nagorno-Karabakh War. She subsequently authored a memoir entitled How I Saw Artsakh.

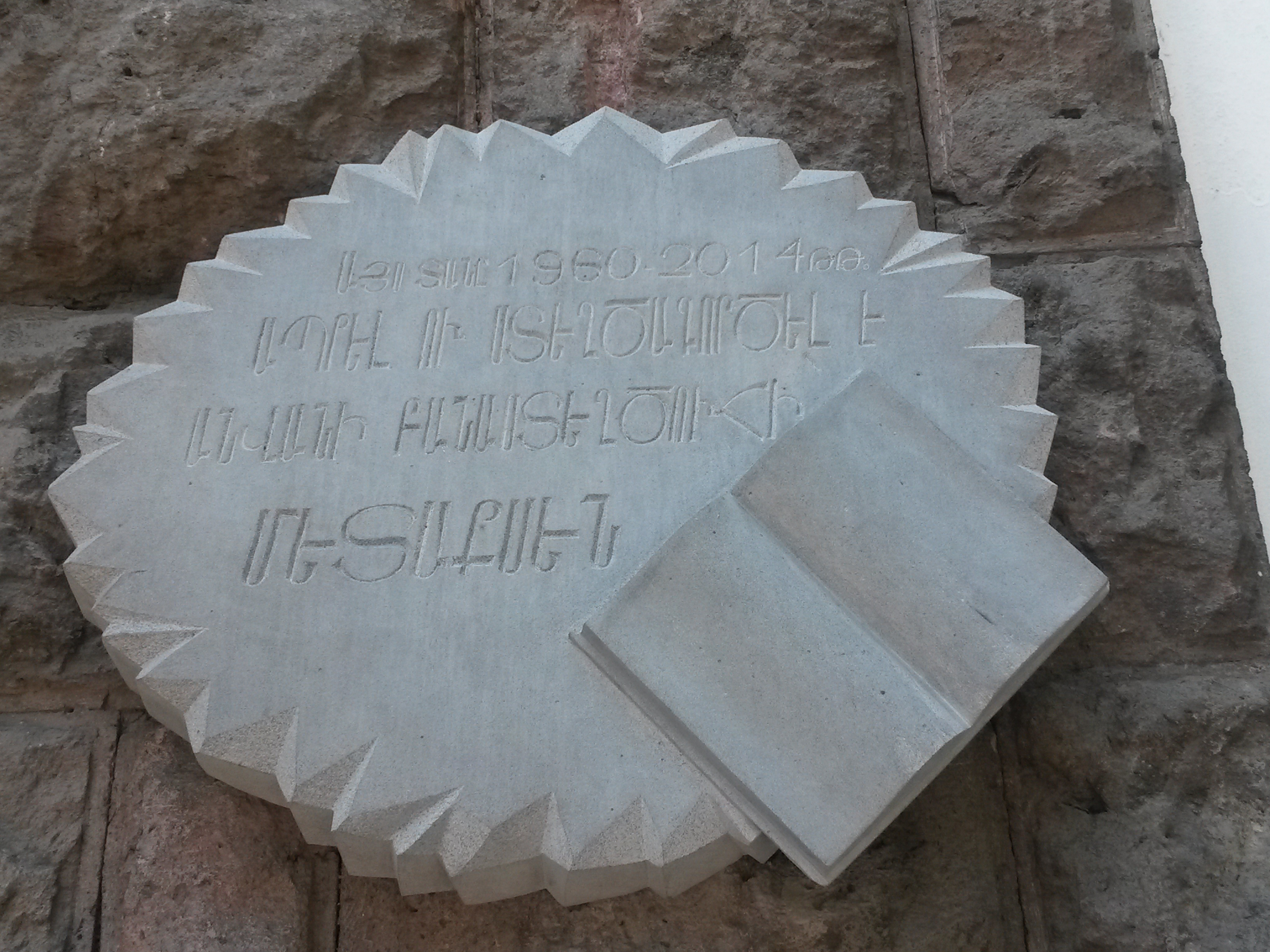
Plaque to Metakse on Tigran Mets avenue, Yerevan

She was in close relations with the famous Armenian poets Hovhannes Shiraz and Paruyr Sevak. Artem Sargsyan called her "one of the most prominent figures of modern Armenian poetry".

She is the mother of Armenian popular poet Lilit.

Metakse died at the age of 88 in Yerevan on August 10, 2014.
