= Strathkelvin and Bearsden =

Strathkelvin and Bearsden may refer to:

- Strathkelvin and Bearsden (UK Parliament constituency)
- Strathkelvin and Bearsden (Scottish Parliament constituency)
