= Mary Healy (zoologist) =

Mary Healy (May 14, 1953 – August 7, 2014) was the CEO and director of the Sacramento Zoo.

Healy was born in Syracuse, New York, and received a bachelors degree from SUNY Binghamton. Her career began as a bird keeper for the Riverbanks Zoo in South Carolina. She was a traditional zookeeper, and later worked for Walt Disney World. Healy was director of the Sacramento Zoo starting in December 1999.

Healy was also the president of the California Association of Zoos and Aquariums. The Sacramento Business Journal awarded Healy the Women Who Mean Business award in 2013.

She died of a cerebral aneurysm and heart attack at the age of 61 on a trip to the Galápagos Islands.
