= Elmer Gray =

Elmer B. Gray (born May 3, 1923 – August 18, 2014) was a baseball figure most well known for his work as an award-winning scout.

Nicknamed Dutch, Gray was born in Pittsburgh, Pennsylvania and attended South Hills High School in Pittsburgh. After serving with the United States Army during World War II, Gray played baseball professionally from 1946 to 1950 for the Fulton Bulldogs (1946), Fulton Chicks (1947), Aberdeen Pheasants (1948), Springfield Browns (1949) and Gloversville-Johnstown Glovers (1950). Career highlights include 11 triples in 1946 and a .311 batting average in 1947.

Following his playing career, he became a scout and served in that capacity for 62 years. He worked for the St. Louis Browns/Baltimore Orioles and Cincinnati Reds. From 1984 to 1989, he served as the Pittsburgh Pirates scouting director. He helped draft or sign well-known baseball players Barry Bonds, Ken Griffey, Sr., Tim Wakefield, Jeff King, Moisés Alou, Orlando Merced and Stan Belinda. He won Scout of the Year in 1992.

He died in Dormont, Pennsylvania.
