= Douglas Morpeth =

Scottish accountant and soldier

Sir Douglas Morpeth
- Born: 4 June 1924; Perth, Scotland
- Died: 26 August 2014 (aged 90)
- Education: University of Edinburgh
- Occupation: Chartered accountant

Sir Douglas Morpeth TD FRCM (6 June 1924 – 26 August 2014) was a Scottish officer in the British Army and a chartered accountant.

== Biography ==
Sir Douglas was born in Perth, Scotland and educated at George Watson's College in Edinburgh. On leaving school in 1942, he volunteered for the army and subsequently served in the Royal Artillery in India, Burma and Malaya. He was demobilised in 1947 with the rank of captain. He attended the University of Edinburgh from 1947 to 1949 where he graduated with a business studies degree. While at the University, Sir Douglas met Anne Rutherford Bell whom he subsequently married in May 1951, after which they moved to London.

In 1951 he joined the Honourable Artillery Company ("HAC"), the oldest regiment in the British Army, and commanded the 1st Regiment HAC, Royal Horse Artillery, from 1964 to 1966. He was appointed Master Gunner within the Tower of London in 1966, a position he held until 1969. He was awarded the Territorial Decoration ("TD") in 1959.

Sir Douglas qualified as an English chartered accountant (rather than a Scottish Chartered Accountant as the Scottish Institute had decided not to shorten training contracts for ex-servicemen) and joined George A. Touche & Co (now Deloitte), one of the few accounting firms in the UK at that time with international presence in the United States and Canada. He was made a Partner in 1958 and was appointed its Senior Partner in 1977, a position he held until his retirement from the firm in 1984. During his time as a partner, Sir Douglas played a significant role in growing the original firm of George A Touche & Co which when he retired was known as Touche Ross & Co and is now known as Deloitte.

Sir Douglas became a member of the Council of the Institute of Chartered Accountants in England and Wales in 1964 and served as President of the Institute (the youngest to be appointed at that time) in 1972. Soon after joining the Council, he was appointed Chairman of the Institute's Parliamentary and Law Committee, which dealt with Company Law and Taxation. He started a campaign to simplify the tax system, which had become complicated by several new taxes introduced by the then Chancellor of the Exchequer. This campaign was successful and the Chancellor set up a Tax Reform Committee to which he was appointed. At his suggestion, the law was changed to allow property left to a widow in her husband's will to be free of inheritance tax and he was also instrumental in the campaign to introduce the separate taxation of husbands and wives - which up until that point had been aggregated as one.

He was one of the originators of the Accounting Standards Committee ("ASC") - whose objective was to develop definitive standards for financial reporting - and at its inception was appointed Vice Chairman.

He was Chairman of the Institute's Overseas Relations Committee for several years and which led to his becoming a key member of the International Accountants' Study Group and ultimately its Chairman.

In 1972, as President of the Institute, he was instrumental in the founding of the International Accounting Standards Committee ("IASC") in London. The IASC was responsible for developing International Accounting Standards and promoting the use and application of these standards across the world.

At the end of his Presidency of the Institute he was asked to join the CBI and chair the Tax Committee, but resigned after three years to become Chairman of the Inflation Accounting Steering Committee. This was required to produce a new accounting standard to set out how companies should prepare their accounts taking into consideration the level of inflation, which at the time was high and detrimental to business. This was adopted as SSAP16 after a great deal of controversy and over 4 years work for the committee between 1976 and 1980.

In 1979 Sir Douglas was awarded the International Accountant of the Year by the University of Hertford, Connecticut, and in the 1981 Birthday Honours, at the age of 57, Sir Douglas was knighted, the knightood being conferred by Queen Elizabeth II at Buckingham Palace for his services to the accounting profession.

While as President he helped found a livery company. He persuaded the Council of the Institute to authorise it and, with the help and authority of the City of London, the Worshipful Company of Chartered Accountants in England and Wales was created with full livery status in 1976. He was Senior Warden in 1976, Master in 1977/8 and served as Senior Past Master.

On retiring from Touche Ross & Co (now Deloitte) he was the first Chairman of the Trustees of the British Telecom Pension Fund, Chairman of Clerical Medical and General Assurance Group, director of the Allied Irish Bank, and director of several other companies before finally retiring at the age of 75.

He was the honorary Treasurer of the Royal College of Music from 1981 to 1996 and was awarded a Fellowship of the Royal College (FRCM).

Sir Douglas was a resident of Shamley Green in Surrey for over 50 years. He supported many local causes and was on the committee to raise the funds to found the HASTE wing at the Royal Surrey Hospital. He was Chairman of the Governors of Longacre School in Shamley Green for many years. His widow, Anne, was the Waverley Borough Councillor for Shamley Green in the 1980s.

Sir Douglas and his wife, Anne, celebrated their 63rd wedding anniversary in 2014. He and his wife had two sons and two daughters, 6 grandsons and 3 granddaughters.
