= Greg Brown (painter) =

American painter

Gregory Douglas Brown
- Born: October 23, 1951; Pittsburgh, Pennsylvania, United States
- Died: August 29, 2014; Palo Alto, California, United States
- Education: Pupil of Roberto Lupetti
- Alma mater: Palo Alto High School (1969)
- Known for: Trompe-l'œil murals, Palo Alto Pedestrian Series
- Movement: Trompe-l'œil
- Awards: First Artist in Residence, City of Palo Alto

Gregory Douglas Brown (October 23, 1951 – August 29, 2014) was an American painter. He lived in Palo Alto, California, and best known for his trompe-l'œil murals in the San Francisco Bay area.

== Biography ==
He was born in Pittsburgh, Pennsylvania, but was still a child when he moved to Palo Alto, California. At age 13, he became a pupil of artist Roberto Lupetti. He attended Palo Alto High School, and graduated in 1969. He was the city of Palo Alto's first Artist in Residence.

The Comprehensive Employment and Training Act (CETA), with help from the city of Palo Alto funded Brown's 1970s murals. The first Palo Alto mural by Brown was created in 1975. The trompe-l'œil murals "Palo Alto Pedestrian Series" located in downtown Palo Alto feature imagery such as aliens, burglars, animals, and normal people.
