= Hayk Ghazaryan =

Armenian historian (1930–2014)

- Born: 23 August 1930; Vardenik, Armenian Soviet Socialist Republic
- Died: 19 August 2014 (aged 83); Yerevan, Armenia
- Citizenship: Armenia
- Scientific career
- Fields: History

Hayk Ghazaryan (Armenian: Ղազարյան Հայկ Միրզաջանի) (23 August 1930 — 19 August 2014) was an Armenian historian and professor nominated to 2007 Nobel Prize for his "The Armenian Genocide in the Ottoman Empire" academic work. It consists of 2 volumes and was translated into Russian, Turkish and a number of European languages. Ghazaryan died in August 2014.

== Book ==
- Ghazaryan Hayk, The genocide of the Armenian people in the Ottoman Empire / by Hayk Ghazaryan . - Yerevan : Tigran Mets, 2005. - 335 p. : ill.; 25 cm. - In English; with bibliographical references in Armenian, Russian, French, German, and Turkish.
