= Myrtle Young =

American potato chip collector (1924–2014)

Myrtle Nola Young (April 1, 1924 – August 9, 2014) was an American potato chip collector whose collection caught the eye of national news and talk shows.

== Collecting ==
The Kentucky-born Young, while working as a potato chip inspector for Seyfert Foods in Fort Wayne, Indiana, selected potato chips that reminded her of something or someone for her collection. She started her collection in 1987 when she saved a chip that looked like a face from the conveyor belt. At the time of her death she was said to have between 250 and 300 chips in her collection.

== Television appearances ==
She appeared with her chips on Happy's Place, The Tonight Show, and Late Night with David Letterman. When she appeared on The Tonight Show in 1987, her back was turned and host Johnny Carson pretended to crunch into one of her prized chips; in 1999, TV Guide named it as the funniest moment ever on television, and was included in a collection of Johnny Carson's greatest moments.

She also appeared on The Chevy Chase Show, Bill Cosby's You Bet Your Life, Geraldo and Vicki! as well as appearances on shows in Amsterdam and London.

== Later life ==
Young later became part of an advertising campaign for Seyfert's and at one point was named to a trade delegation from Fort Wayne that toured the Far East.

After her retirement, Young continued to serve as a tour guide at the potato chip factory and showed off her collection of chips resembling Bob Hope, Rodney Dangerfield, animals and other curiosities until the plant closed in 2000.

== Death ==
She died in Fort Wayne, Indiana, aged 90, on August 9, 2014, from congestive heart failure.
