= Fanny Morweiser =

German writer (1940–2014)

Fanny Morweiser (11 March 1940 – 13 August 2014) was a German writer.

== Biography ==
Morweiser was born in Ludwigshafen. She studied the subjects sculpturing, painting and drawing at the Freie Akademie in Mannheim. Later she lived in Mosbach, a pictures town close to the Odenwald and the Neckar Valley in south-western Germany.

In 1971, Morweiser's first book ’’Lalu lalula, arme kleine Ophelia – Eine unheimliche Liebesgeschichte’’ was published by the Diogenes Verlag in Zürich (Switzerland). Further collections of short stories and novels followed and finally she had written thirteen volumes. In the 1980th two of her stories were used as basis for two feature films, which were shown in German TV. In 2002 she was honoured with the office of the ‘’Turmschreiber’’ (Writer of the Tower) in Deidesheim.

Some of Morweiser’s short stories had been translated into English and were published in different American Journals. For example: The Taxi Dancer, in: The Antigonish Review 119 (1999), p. 29-32, or: Fervent Red, in: New Orleans Review 27/1 (2001), p, 138-144.
