= Lekhraj Bachani =

Indian politician

Lekhraj Bachani (1929–2014) was a leader of Bharatiya Janata Party from Gujarat. He was a member of Rajya Sabha. Earlier, he was a member of Gujarat Legislative Assembly from 1972 to 1995. Narendra Modi appreciated his immense contribution to the society. Governor of Gujarat Shri OP Kohli and Chief Minister Smt. Anandiben Patel also appreciated his contribution and also condoled on his demise.
