= George Linton (Barbadian cricketer) =

Barbadian cricketer (1956–2014)

Personal information
- Full name: George Lester Lincoln Linton
- Born: 12 November 1956; Waverley Cot, Saint George, Barbados
- Died: 14 August 2014 (aged 57); Hothersal Turning, Saint Michael, Barbados
- Batting: Right-handed
- Bowling: Right-arm leg-spin

Domestic team information
- Years: Team
- 1981-82 to 1989-90: Barbados

Career statistics
Competition	First-class	List A
Matches	26	2
Runs scored	734	12
Batting average	25.31	12.00
100s/50s	0/5	0/0
Top score	83	10 not out
Balls bowled	4588	113
Wickets	78	6
Bowling average	29.75	12.00
5 wickets in innings	5	0
10 wickets in match	0	n/a
Best bowling	5/35	3/28
Catches/stumpings	11/–	0/–
- Source: Cricinfo, 13 July 2019

George Lester Lincoln Linton (12 November 1956 – 14 August 2014) was a Barbadian cricketer. He played first-class cricket for Barbados from 1982 to 1990.

Linton was a leg-spin and googly bowler and lower-order batsman. His best bowling figures were 5 for 35 against Guyana in 1982-83, when he also scored 66. He was a youth coach for Barbados's National Sports Council for many years.

He played one season in 1987 as overseas professional/coach with Scottish East League Division One outfit Kirkcaldy Cricket Club (now defunct).
