= Ima Wells =

American politician

Ima Lee Wells (née Greenwood; September 23, 1936 – August 10, 2014) was an American educator and politician.

Born in Buffalo, Oklahoma, Wells received her bachelor's degree in education from Northwestern Oklahoma State University and her master's degree in education from New Mexico State University. She taught school in Kansas and New Mexico. In 1993, Wells served in the New Mexico House of Representatives as a Democrat. She died in Loveland, Colorado.
