= Peter Handrinos =

American sports writer

Peter C. Handrinos (April 20, 1972 – August 21, 2014) was an author who wrote primarily about baseball. His works include The Funniest Baseball Book Ever, The Truth About Ruth and More: Behind Yankees Myths, Legends, and Lore and The Best New York Sports Arguments: The 100 Most Controversial, Debatable Questions for Die-Hard New York Fans and Errors and Fouls: Inside Baseball's Ninety-Nine Most Popular Myths. He also wrote occasionally for Yahoo! Sports.

== Personal life ==
Handrinos was born in Norwalk, Connecticut. He attended Norwalk High School and then Yale University. He later earned his earned his master's degree from Cambridge University and his law degree from University of Virginia.

Prior to becoming an author, he was a practicing lawyer.
