= Peter M. Harman =

British historian of science (1943–2014)

- Born: 11 December 1943; Leeds, Yorkshire
- Died: 14 August 2014 (aged 70)

Academic background
- Education: University of Oxford (BSc MA); University of Leeds (PhD)

Academic work
- Discipline: History of Science
- Institutions: University of Glasgow (1969–70); University of Cambridge (1970–74); University of Lancaster (1974–2007)

Peter Michael Harman (11 December 1943 – 14 August 2014) was a British historian who was Professor of the History of Science at the University of Lancaster.

== Career ==
Harman was born in Leeds, Yorkshire, the son of Herbert and Gertrude (nee Harris) Heimann. He studied at Oriel College, Oxford and later at the University of Leeds. He was Assistant Lecturer at the University of Glasgow (1969–70) and at the University of Cambridge (1970–74) where he was a Fellow of Clare Hall (1971–74), before being appointed Lecturer at the University of Lancaster in 1974. He was appointed Reader in 1993 and professor in 1999 until his retirement in 2007.

Harman was a Visiting scholar at Harvard University (1988–89 and 1990–91). As Zeeman Professor of the History of Physics at the University of Amsterdam in 1995, his lectures were on the topic of The Natural Philosophy of James Clerk Maxwell and were later published.

Alexandra Square, Lancaster University

Harman's research was focussed chiefly on the history of natural philosophy and physics in the 18th and 19th centuries, covering the period after Isaac Newton, with his most important work being his research on the physicist James Clerk Maxwell, which was supported by the Royal Society, the Leverhulme Trust (1986–87), the National Science Foundation (1988–89 and 1990–91), and the Arts and Humanities Research Board.

== Bibliography ==
- Harman, P.M. (1982), Energy, Force and Matter: The Conceptual Development of Nineteenth-Century Physics, Cambridge Studies in the History of Science, Cambridge: Cambridge University Press, ISBN 978-0521288125
- Harman, P.M. (1982), Metaphysics and Natural Philosophy, Brighton: Harvester Press
- Harman, P.M., ed. (1985), Wranglers and Physicists: Studies on Cambridge Physics in the Nineteenth Century, Manchester: Manchester University Press, ISBN 9780719017568
- Harman, P.M. (1983), The Scientific Revolution, Lancaster Pamphlets, London: Methuen, ISBN 9780416350401
- Harman, P.M. (1990), The Scientific Letters and Papers of James Clerk Maxwell: Volume I: 1846–62, Cambridge: Cambridge University Press, ISBN 978-0521101363
- Harman, P.M.; Shapiro, A. E.; Whiteside, D.T., eds. (1992), The Investigation of Difficult Things: Essays on Newton and the History of the Exact Sciences (1st; 2nd (2002) ed.), Cambridge: Cambridge University Press, ISBN 978-0521892667
- Harman, P.M. (1993), After Newton: Essays on Natural Philosophy, Aldershot: Ashgate Publishing, ISBN 9780860783480
- Harman, P.M. (1995), The Scientific Letters and Papers of James Clerk Maxwell: Volume II: 1862–74, Cambridge: Cambridge University Press, ISBN 9780521256261
- Harman, P.M. (1998), The Natural Philosophy of James Clerk Maxwell (1st; 2nd (2010) ed.), Cambridge: Cambridge University Press, ISBN 978-0521005852
- Harman, P.M. (2002), The Scientific Letters and Papers of James Clerk Maxwell: Volume III: 1874–9, Cambridge: Cambridge University Press, ISBN 978-0521746175
- Harman, P.M.; Mitton, S., eds. (2002), Cambridge Scientific Minds, Cambridge: Cambridge University Press, ISBN 978-0521786126
- Harman, P.M. (2009), The Culture of Nature in Britain, 1680–1860, New Haven: Yale University Press, ISBN 978-0300151978
