= Francisco García Escalero =

Spanish serial killer (1948–2014)

- Born: Francisco García Escalero; 24 May 1948; Madrid, Spain
- Died: 19 August 2014 (aged 66); Alicante, Spain
- Other name: El Matamendigos (The Beggars Killer)
- Penalty: Declared insane; confined to a Psychiatric hospital

Details
- Victims: 11 known, possible more victims
- Span of crimes: 1987–1994
- Country: Spain
- Date apprehended: April 1994

Francisco García Escalero (24 May 1948 – 19 August 2014) was a Spanish serial killer convicted for the murders of at least 11 individuals between 1987 and 1994. He also practiced necrophilia and cannibalism.

== Biography ==
Escalero was born on 24 May 1948 in Madrid, Spain. He was a sickly and strange boy who received a poor and inferior education. From an early age, he showed a fascination with death and enjoyed walking through the cemetery. His father hated him and subjected him to many beatings. At age 16, Escalero was confined to a psychiatric hospital and he committed many thefts. In 1973 he was confined to a reformatory after stealing a motorbike and was released in 1975. Shortly after, he committed his first serious crime when he raped a girl with his friends. Escalero raped the girl in front of her boyfriend. He was arrested and sentenced to a term of 12 years in prison. When he was released in 1984, he was unemployed and started a career as a street beggar. He liked to drink a mixture of alcohol and drugs, and he sometimes displayed violent and aggressive behaviour. Escalero had schizophrenia and experienced hallucinations that urged him to kill.

== Crimes and arrest ==
Disturbed by the "voices", Escalero's first murder was of Paula Martínez in August 1987. She was a sex worker. Escalero decapitated and burned her.

In March 1988 Escalero killed a beggar named Juan. Escalero stabbed him before crushing his head with a stone.

Months later, another beggar was found dead and seriously burned.

Escalero continued killing many more people, practising acts of necrophilia and cannibalism; he was known to go to cemeteries to steal bodies to rape them.

In March 1989, a beggar named Ángel was found dead, decapitated and without his fingertips.

In May 1989 another beggar, Julio, was found stabbed to death, without his penis, and burned.

In 1994, the police were alerted by a psychiatric hospital that two men had escaped. The men were Escalero and his friend Víctor Luis Criado. Both were drunk. Two days later, the police found Victor Luis Criado dead with his skull crushed and burned. During the police investigation, Escalero attempted suicide on the street but only fractured a leg. At the hospital, he confessed to the murders and asked the nurses to see to it that he was arrested. Francisco García Escalero was finally arrested in April 1994 by the police.

Escalero went on trial in February 1995 but was declared insane with a severe mental disorder caused by alcoholism and schizophrenia and was confined to a psychiatric hospital.

== See also ==
- List of serial killers by country
- List of serial killers by number of victims
