= Rosalba Rincon Castell =

Colombian fencing coach

Rosalba Rincón Castell (28 November 1934 – 17 August 2014) was a Colombian fencing coach. He devoted much of his life to developing Colombian fencing. Castell taught several fencers, including 2000 and 2004 Olympic fencer and current coach Angela Maria Espinosa Toro.
