= Kate O'Hanlon =

Irish nurse

Kate O'Hanlon (1930 in Belfast – 2 August 2014) was an Accident & Emergency nursing sister at the Royal Victoria Hospital, Belfast, Northern Ireland, during the Troubles. She wrote a book about her experiences, Sister Kate: Nursing Through the Troubles, which was published by Blackstaff Press on 31 December 2010.

She worked in the RVH Falls Road casualty department from 1960 until the late 1980s. She helped treat victims of violence from all sides, such as bombings, shootings, stabbings, etc., including the Malvern Street shootings of 1966, the loyalist bomb attack on McGurk's Bar, the IRA bombing of the Abercorn Restaurant, the carbombing in Donegall Street which saw 150 casualties arrive, and Bloody Friday, among other incidents.

New methods of nursing care were developed and the RVH treated victims of rubber bullets, plastic baton rounds, and paramilitary punishments such as tarring and feathering, and drilled knee caps.

Kate died on 2 August 2014.

== Works ==
- Sister Kate: Nursing Through the Troubles ISBN info.
