= Bobo Sikorski =

Canadian professional football player

Profile
- Position: Guard

Personal information
- Born: June 25, 1927; Winnipeg, Manitoba, Canada
- Died: August 23, 2014 (aged 87); British Columbia, Canada
- Listed height: 6 ft 1 in (1.85 m)
- Listed weight: 210 lb (95 kg)

Career history
- 1954: BC Lions

Robert "Bobo" Sikorski (June 25, 1927 – August 23, 2014) was a Canadian professional football player who played for the BC Lions. He played junior football for the Vancouver Blue Bombers.
