= John Macklin (academic) =

Northern Irish scholar of Hispanic studies

Principal of the University of Paisley
- In office 2001–2005
- Preceded by: Professor Richard Shaw
- Succeeded by: Professor Seamus McDaid

Personal details
- Born: 9 October 1947
- Died: August 2014 (aged 66)
- Education: Queen's University Belfast
- Website: University of Glasgow profile

John Joseph Macklin (9 October 1947 – August 2014) was a Northern Irish scholar of Hispanic studies. He held posts at a number of British universities, and from 2001 to 2005 was principal and vice-chancellor of the University of Paisley (now the University of the West of Scotland). At the time of his death he was professor of Hispanic studies at the University of Glasgow and head of the School of Modern Languages and Cultures, and a visiting professor at the University of Ulster. In 1994, he was made a Commandor of the Order of Isabella the Catholic by King Juan Carlos for his services to Spanish studies.

== Early life ==
Macklin studied at Queen's University Belfast in Belfast, Northern Ireland, graduating with first class honours in French and Spanish (BA) and with a Ph.D. in 1976 on the works of Spanish writer Ramón Pérez de Ayala.

== Career ==
Macklin began his teaching career at the University of Hull as a lecturer in Hispanic studies in 1973, being promoted to senior lecturer in 1985. He was made head of the Department of Hispanic Studies in 1986, and in 1988 moved to the University of Leeds as Cowdray Professor of Spanish, a chair endowed by Weetman Pearson, 1st Viscount Cowdray, industrialist and founder of Pearson PLC. He was appointed dean of the Faculty of Arts in 1992, dean for research in humanities in 1994 and pro-vice-chancellor in 1999, before moving in 2001 to the University of Paisley as principal and vice-chancellor. He was appointed professor of Spanish at the University of Strathclyde in 2006 and in 2010 became professor of Hispanic studies and head of the School of Modern Languages and Cultures at the University of Glasgow. He was a visiting professor at the University of Ulster from 2007.

== Personal life ==
Macklin was married with three children.
