= Hans M. Hirschi =

Hans Martin Hirschi
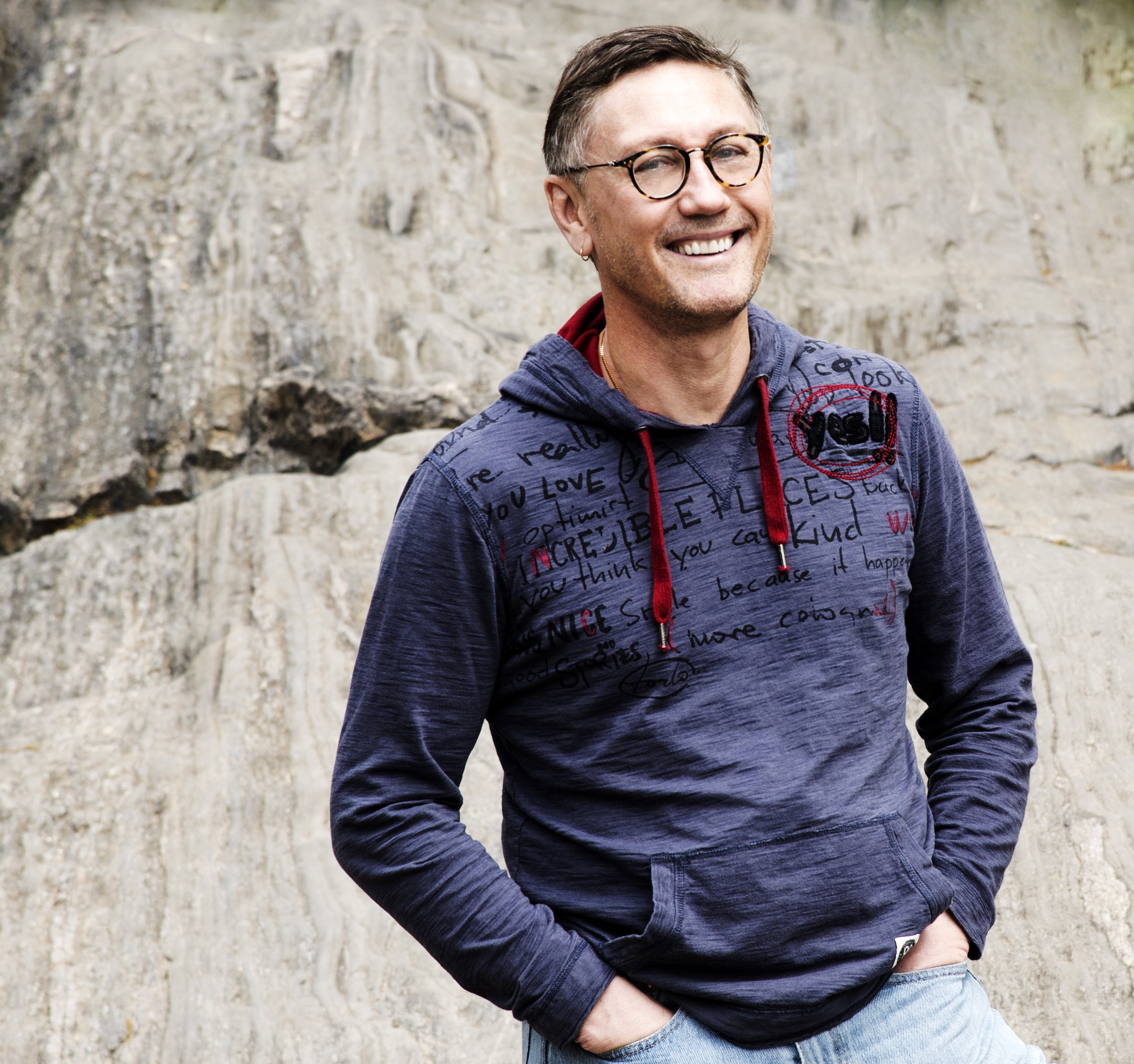
- Born: June 4, 1967 (age 59); Samedan, Switzerland
- Education: University of Gothenburg
- Occupations: Author, writer, training executive
- Spouse: Alex
- Children: 1
- Website: www.hirschi.se

Hans Martin Hirschi (born June 4, 1967) is an author, writer and training executive and LGBT rights activist based in Sweden. He is also co-founder and president of Yaree, an independent publisher and consultancy firm.

== Early life and education ==
Hirschi was born and raised in Samedan, Switzerland. He learned seven languages before graduating high school and five Scandinavian languages in college. Hirschi studied literature at the University of Gothenburg.

== Career ==
Hirschi began writing Greek mythology as a teenager. He wrote a book about e-learning pedagogy and another about his management philosophies during his corporate career. After his son was born, Hirschi wrote fictional works. He has self-published a poetry book and a short story. He has also published four novels and an e-book documenting his experience with parenting in India. Hirschi is a member of the Swedish Writers' Union and the Writers' Center in Sweden. In 2015, Hirschi released his first science fiction novel, Willem of the Tafel. Hirschi's novels try to tell positive, hopeful stories for the LGBT community, without shying away from difficult topics, and often center around families and relationships. In 2018 Hirschi ventured into writing for a much younger audience with his first children's book and his youth fantasy series The Golden One which tackles the environmental challenges facing Earth but also the gap between those growing up and the adults.

== Personal life ==
Hirschi lives on an island off the coast of Sweden with his husband Alex and their son Sascha.

== Bibliography ==
- Momente (1991)
- Platonmetoden - Internetpedagogik (2000/2002)
- Common Sense - in Business & Life (2010)
- Jonathan's Hope (2013)
- Family Ties (2013)
- The Opera House (2013)
- Dads: A gay couple's surrogacy journey in India (2014)
- Living the Rainbow: A gay family triptych (2014)
- The Fallen Angels of Karnataka (2014)
- A Christmas Tale (2014)
- Willem of the Tafel (2015)
- Ross Deere – Handy Man (2016)
- Nightmare (2016)
- Jonathan's Promise (2016)
- Jonathan's Legacy (2016)
- Common Sense - In Business & Life (2016 - 2nd Edition)
- Last Winter's Snow (2017)
- Disease (2017)
- Clara (2017)
- Returning to the Land of the Morning Calm (2018)
- The Dragon Princess (Valerius and Evander #1) (2018)
- The Golden One - Blooming (2018)
- The Golden One - Deceit (2019)
- The Golden One - Reckoning (2019)
- Valerius and Evander : Felix and The Orphanage (2020)
- Matt: More Than Words (2020)
- The Vampire That Lost Her Fangs (2020)
- Michael - Fallen Angel of Paris (2022)
- Anna and the Lost Zorn (2023)
