= Henry Ezeagwuna II =

Nigerian traditional ruler

Obi Henry Ezeagwuna II was a Nigerian traditional ruler who served as the Obi of Issele-Uku, a kingdom in Aniocha North Local Government Area of Delta State, Nigeria.

== Reign ==
Ezeagwuna was born in Benin City to Obi Osemene III and was enthroned as Obi of Issele-Uku in 1996.

Ezeagwuna II served as the Obi of Issele-Uku until his death on 9 August 2014. He died in a road traffic collision on the Benin–Asaba highway while travelling to Asaba. The accident also claimed the life of Sunny Ofili, an aide to the then Governor of Delta State, Emmanuel Uduaghan.

Following his death, his son, Nduka Ezeagwuna, succeeded him as the Obi of Issele-Uku after completing his studies at the University of Ibadan. He was formally presented with the staff of office by the Delta State Government in December 2016.

== See also ==
- Issele-Uku
