= Frank W. Hirschi =

American politician

Frank William Hirschi (February 2, 1925 – August 13, 2014) was an American educator and politician.

Born in Montpelier, Idaho, his parents were immigrants from Switzerland. Hirschi served in the United States Navy during World War II. He then received his bachelor's degree, masters, and doctorate degrees from Utah State University and then taught agriculture in high school. Hirschi served in the Idaho House of Representatives from 1960 to 1966. He also served as Mayor of Centerville, Utah from 1998 to 2002 and on the Centerville City Council. He died in Pleasant Grove, Utah.

Hirschi was a member of the Church of Jesus Christ of Latter-day Saints. For a time he worked for the Church in the seminaries and institutes program, including serving as a coordinator based in Garden Grove, California. He had begun his career as a high school agriculture teacher. In Centerville, Utah he worked in the central office of the Church Educational System. Over the years he served in several callings including bishop and a counselor in a stake president. He was the first president of the Church's Jackson Mississippi Mission from 1979 to 1982 and later served as president of the MTC in New Zealand, a stake patriarch and a sealer in the Bountiful Utah Temple.
