= Norman Hewitt =

American politician (1928–2014)

Member of the Connecticut State Senate from the 25th district
- In office 1958–1960
- Succeeded by: John M. Lupton

Personal details
- Born: Norman Hewitt; January 4, 1928 The Bronx, New York, U.S.
- Died: August 12, 2014 (aged 86) Fairfield, Connecticut, U.S.
- Party: Democratic
- Education: City College of New York; Harvard Law School

Norman Hewitt (January 4, 1928 – August 12, 2014) was an American politician who served in the Connecticut State Senate representing the 25th district from 1958 to 1960.
