= Sue Richards (artist) =

Canadian artist and social entrepreneur

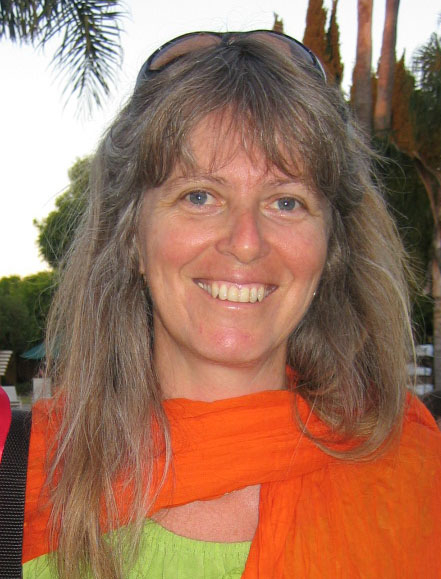
- Sue Richards at a July 2006 blogger meeting
- Born: 1958; Canada
- Died: August 2, 2014; Guelph, Ontario, Canada
- Occupation: Artist

Sue Richards (1958 – August 2, 2014) was a Canadian artist and social entrepreneur from Guelph, Ontario. Sue moved to Guelph in 1981 to attend the University of Guelph. In 2002 she launched the Breast of Canada calendar in support of breast health and breast cancer prevention.

== Biography ==
Following graduation and prior to starting the calendar, Richards helped grow the Hillside Festival during its first decade and served as Artistic Director from 1990 to 1992.

In 1998, the Artist in Community National Pilot Project funded by the Laidlaw Foundation, the Canada Council for the Arts and the Ontario Arts Council awarded Richards one of eight grants available in the country for her submission, Art Jam. Community partners include AIDS Committee of Guelph and Wellington County and Guelph and District Multicultural Centre. The pilot project wrapped up in 2000 following the controversial sale of the project's workspace, Torrance Public School. Since then, Art Jam has continued to be offered as a creative leadership workshop.

In 2000, YMCA–YWCA 5th Women of Distinction Awards announced Richards as the recipient of the Arts and Culture Award. In 2003 she was the Honorary Chair for the Women of Distinction Awards.

In late 2007, Richards stated that due to personal health concerns, she would not be publishing the 2008 edition of the Breast of Canada calendar. By early 2008, Richards publicly announced she was suffering from Parkinson's disease. A benefit concert was organized on her behalf in April 2008. Richards later stated that the 2009 edition would not be printed citing her health problems; nor were there 2010 or 2011 editions. On August 2, 2014, Richards succumbed to her failing health.

Richards blogged about women's health issues, her struggle with Parkinson's disease, and the City of Guelph.
