= Josef Hrnčíř =

Czech conductor, musicologist, and music theorist

Josef Hrnčíř (2 April 1921 – 31 August 2014) was a Czech conductor, musicologist and music theorist. In 2008, he received the Award of Society for Science and Arts.

He died at age 93.
