= Arthur Olsen (politician) =

American politician

Member of the Nevada General Assembly
- In office 1964–1966; 1970–1972

Personal details
- Born: February 13, 1914 Chicago, Illinois, United States
- Died: August 8, 2014 (aged 100) Las Vegas, Nevada, United States
- Party: Democratic
- Spouse: Helen Olsen
- Profession: attorney

Arthur Olsen (February 13, 1914 – August 8, 2014) was an American politician who was a Democratic member of the Nevada General Assembly. An attorney, he is an alumnus of DePaul University. He was admitted to the bar in 1952.
