= Clem Comly =

Clement Comly, IV (December 31, 1954 – August 6, 2014) was a baseball researcher, author and statistician.

== Personal life ==
Comly earned a Bachelor of Science degree in chemical engineering and a master's degree in business administration from the University of Pennsylvania. He died in Wallingford, Pennsylvania.

== Baseball work ==
He served as the vice president of Retrosheet from 2004 to 2013 and did extensive data entry work for the organization.

He co-authored numerous books, including The Year of Blue Snow: The 1964 Philadelphia Phillies, Sweet '60: The 1960 Pittsburgh Pirates and The Miracle Braves of 1914: Boston's Original Worst-to-First World Series Champions.

He was a member of the Society for American Baseball Research, joining in 1982 and serving as co-chair of the Statistical Analysis Committee.

He also did statistical work for MLB.com.

His work has been used and cited by many publications.
