= Alexander Monteith Currie =

Doctor Alexander Monteith Currie OBE (2 May 1926 – 24 August 2014) was a university administrator secretary of The University of Edinburgh from 1978 to 1989.

In 1989 Currie was awarded Sweden's Order of the Polar Star (first class) in recognition of his work increasing cooperation between British and Swedish universities.

Curry attended Stevenston High School in Ayrshire. He served on HMS Boxer during the Second World War. He studied English literature at Bangor University and St Catherine's College, Oxford. He then worked in administrative roles in The University of Manchester, University of Liverpool and Sheffield University before moving to Edinburgh.
