= Deaths in March 2015 =

The following is a list of notable deaths in March 2015.

Entries for each day are listed alphabetically by surname. A typical entry lists information in the following sequence:

- Name, age, country of citizenship and reason for notability, established cause of death, reference.

== March 2015 ==
=== 1 ===
- Bob Armstrong, 82, American politician, member of the Texas House of Representatives (1963–1971) and Commissioner of the General Land Office (1971–1983).
- Malcolm Bennett, 56, British poet and author.
- William Bowyer, 88, British painter.
- Jennifer Ward Clarke, 79, British cellist.
- John Clegg, 80, Australian archaeologist.
- Deedee Corradini, 70, American politician, Mayor of Salt Lake City (1992–2000), lung cancer.
- Suzanne Farrington, 81, British stage actress.
- Joshua Fishman, 88, American linguist.
- Orrin Keepnews, 91, American jazz record producer, executive and writer.
- Georg Kreisel, 91, Austrian mathematical logician.
- Anatoly Logunov, 88, Russian theoretical physicist and academician (Russian Academy of Sciences).
- Stuart McGrady, 29, Scottish footballer (Ayr United, Queen's Park).
- Jeff McKnight, 52, American baseball player (New York Mets, Baltimore Orioles), leukemia.
- Guram Minashvili, 79, Georgian basketball player, Olympic silver medalist (1960), three-time European champion (1957, 1959, 1963).
- Minnie Miñoso, 89, Cuban baseball player (Chicago White Sox, Cleveland Indians), pulmonary artery dissection.
- Kenneth Plante, 75, American politician, complications from amyotrophic lateral sclerosis.
- Tony Reddin, 95, Irish hurler (Tipperary GAA).
- Atul Tandon, 67, Indian academic, heart attack.
- Raymond Toscanelli, 93, French footballer (Angers, Montpellier).
- Carel Visser, 86, Dutch sculptor.
- Daniel von Bargen, 64, American actor (Malcolm in the Middle, O Brother, Where Art Thou?, Super Troopers).
- Thomas Philip Watson, 81, American politician, member of the Oklahoma Senate (1972–1987).
- Chris Welp, 51, German basketball player (Washington Huskies), heart attack.
- Wolfram Wuttke, 53, German footballer, Olympic bronze medalist (1988), multiple organ failure.
- Matthew Young, 70, British civil servant and executive (Panini Group).

=== 2 ===
- Dennis Barker, 85, British journalist.
- Tom Butters, 89, Canadian politician.
- Les Chamberlain, 81, English rugby league player.
- Desmond Daniel, 72, South African cricketer.
- Kent Finlay, 77, American singer-songwriter.
- Francisco González Ledesma, 87, Spanish novelist, comics writer and journalist, complications of a stroke.
- Bettina Graziani, 90, French fashion model.
- Beverly Hall, 68, Jamaican-born American educator, breast cancer.
- David Harker, 64, British charity administrator, cancer.
- Dean Hess, 97, American minister and air force colonel.
- Lavkumar Khachar, 84, Indian ornithologist, prostate cancer.
- Joseph Kohnen, 74, Luxembourgish writer.
- Dave Mackay, 80, Scottish football player and manager (Tottenham Hotspur, Derby County).
- Jem Marsh, 84, British automotive engineer, co-founder of Marcos Engineering.
- Jenna McMahon, 89, American television writer (The Carol Burnett Show, The Facts of Life, Mama's Family), heart failure.
- Michel Menu, 99, French engineer and author.
- Jay Morrish, 78, American golf course designer.
- Mal Peet, 67, British author and illustrator, cancer.
- Marc Taraskoff, 59, French illustrator and stamp designer.

=== 3 ===
- Kerry Ashby, 86, New Zealand Olympic rower (1952).
- Ernest Braun, 89, Austrian-born British academic and author.
- André Brulé, 93, French racing cyclist.
- Gilles Cistac, 53, French-born Mozambican human rights lawyer, shot.
- Denis Coe, 86, British politician, MP for Middleton and Prestwich (1966–1970).
- M. Stanton Evans, 80, American journalist, author and educator, pancreatic cancer.
- Otto Kinne, 91, German marine biologist.
- Roy McCrohan, 84, English footballer (Norwich City).
- Octávio Mobiglia, 83, Brazilian Olympic swimmer (1952, 1956).
- John Mockler, 73, American politician, California Secretary of Education (2000–2002), pancreatic cancer.
- Joseph T. Palastra Jr., 83, American army general.
- Peter Yaxley, 86, New Zealand rugby player and referee.
- Brett Young, 47, American CFL football player, kidney failure.

=== 4 ===
- Stacey Arceneaux, 79, American basketball player (St. Louis Hawks).
- Emory Bass, 89, American actor (Dark Shadows, 1776, Angie).
- Dušan Bilandžić, 90, Croatian historian and politician.
- Marguerite Dupire, 94, French ethnologist.
- Terry Fearnley, 81, Australian rugby league player (Eastern Suburbs) and coach (national team), cancer.
- George W. Grayson, 76, American politician, member of the Virginia House of Delegates from the 51st (1973–1981) and 97th (1983–2001) districts, heart attack.
- Ray Hatton, 83, British-born American author.
- Iwao Horiuchi, 63, Japanese wrestler, diabetes.
- Karl-Alfred Jacobsson, 89, Swedish footballer (GAIS).
- Jørgen Jensen, 68, Danish Olympic cyclist (1968).
- William King, 90, American sculptor.
- Ninan Koshy, 81, Indian academic.
- Lothar Lutze, 87, Polish-born German scholar.
- Laxminarayana Mudiraj, 86, Indian politician, Mayor of Hyderabad (1969–1970).
- James Norick, 95, American politician, Mayor of Oklahoma City (1959–1963, 1967–1971).
- Thomas Oakland, 75, American psychologist, house fire.
- Jim Rhodes, 69, English golf player.
- Jam Sebastian, 28, Filipino webcast personality, lung cancer.
- Steve Shea, 72, American baseball player (Houston Astros, Montreal Expos).
- John Simopoulos, 91, British philosopher.
- Jack Swanstrom, 53, American educator and film director.
- Arthur Wyatt, 85, British diplomat, High Commissioner to Ghana (1986–1989).

=== 5 ===
- Klaus Basikow, 77, German football player and manager.
- Vlada Divljan, 56, Serbian musician (Idoli).
- Edward Egan, 82, American Roman Catholic prelate, Cardinal, Bishop of Bridgeport (1988–2000), Archbishop of New York (2000–2009).
- Evelyn Furtsch, 100, American sprinter, Olympic gold medalist (1932).
- Katherine Godwin, 98, American teacher and educator, First Lady of Virginia (1966–1970, 1974–1978).
- Maigore Kallon, 89, Sierra Leonean politician, Minister of Foreign Affairs (1965–1967, 1996).
- John R. Keennan, 74, American baseball scout (Los Angeles Dodgers).
- Karina Kraushaar, 43, German actress, multiple organ failure.
- Fred Latremouille, 69, Canadian radio host.
- Albert Maysles, 88, American documentary filmmaker (Gimme Shelter, Grey Gardens).
- Jim McCann, 70, Irish musician (The Dubliners).
- Umarali Quvvatov, 46, Tajikistani opposition politician and leader of Group 24, shot.
- ML Procise, 62, American sound engineer.
- Erling Sandene, 93, Norwegian judge, Chief Justice of the Supreme Court (1984–1991), County Governor of Møre og Romsdal (1966–1972).
- Dirk Shafer, 52, American model, actor and director (Man of the Year), drug intoxication.
- Madoka Takagi, 58–59, Japanese-American photographer.
- Ron Wilke, 88, South African Olympic sprinter.
- Jerry Wilson, 78, American football player (Auburn Tigers, Philadelphia Eagles, Toronto Argonauts).

=== 6 ===
- Lisa Bonchek Adams, 45, American breast cancer advocate and blogger, breast cancer.
- Mick Clark, 78, English rugby league player (Leeds), Parkinson's disease.
- Fred Craddock, 86, American Christian minister, Parkinson's disease.
- Ram Sundar Das, 94, Indian politician, Chief Minister of Bihar (1979–1980).
- Arthur Gratias, 94, American politician.
- Paul John, 85, American tribal chief (Yupik peoples).
- Edward L. Keenan, 79, American historian.
- Ben Kingree, 80, American politician, member of the Tennessee House of Representatives (1967–1969).
- Kishore Te, 36, Indian film editor (Aadukalam), blood clot.
- Dan Lewis, 79, American football player (Detroit Lions), diabetes.
- Vasilios Magginas, 66, Greek politician, Minister of Employment (2007).
- Osi Rhys Osmond, 71, Welsh painter and television presenter, cancer.
- Andrew Oung, 64, Taiwanese businessman and politician, heart attack.
- Pheiroijam Parijat Singh, 72, Indian politician.
- Ray Shanklin, 68, American film composer (Fritz the Cat, Heavy Traffic).
- George Silvernail, 87, Puerto Rican Olympic sports shooter (1968).
- Colin Stewart, 88, American Olympic skier.
- Enrique "Coco" Vicéns, 88, Puerto Rican basketball player and politician.

=== 7 ===
- Gregorio Bundio, 86, Argentine football player and coach (El Salvador national team).
- Izola Curry, 98, American assailant, attempted to kill Martin Luther King Jr.
- Sir Derek Day, 87, British diplomat, Ambassador to Ethiopia (1975–1978) and High Commissioner to Canada (1984–1987).
- Ian Fraser, 93, British naval pilot and diplomat.
- Trevor Griffin, 74, Australian politician, Attorney-General of South Australia (1979–1982, 1993–2001).
- Whaley Hall, 73, American football player (Dallas Cowboys).
- Ray Hefferlin, 85, American physicist.
- Dick Hensley, 87, American football player (New York Giants, Pittsburgh Steelers, Chicago Bears).
- G. Karthikeyan, 66, Indian politician, Speaker of the Kerala Legislative Assembly (since 2011), liver cancer.
- F. Ray Keyser Jr., 87, American politician, Governor of Vermont (1961–1963).
- Edmond Malinvaud, 91, French economist.
- Reima Nummila, 72, Finnish footballer.
- Shinji Ogawa, 74, Japanese voice actor (The Rose of Versailles, Fist of the North Star), pneumonia.
- Glorianne Perrier, 85, American Olympic silver medallist (1964) sprint canoer.
- Tomislav Radić, 74, Croatian film director.
- Brian Sutton-Smith, 90, New Zealand writer and play theorist, Alzheimer's disease.
- Yoshihiro Tatsumi, 79, Japanese manga author.
- Ross Turnbull, 74, Australian rugby union player (national team), cancer.
- Neil Young, 78, Canadian politician.

=== 8 ===
- Inezita Barroso, 90, Brazilian folk singer.
- Mary Beattie, 91, American politician.
- Hans Bielenstein, 94, Swedish sinologist.
- Francisco Cacharro, 78, Spanish politician, President of the Provincial Deputation of Lugo (1983–2007).
- Brian Cahill, 84, Australian newsreader and politician.
- Velayudhan Govindan, Indian cricketer.
- Bengt Hägglund, 94, Swedish theologian.
- Ernst Heincke, 83, German-born American Olympic sprint canoer (1968).
- Pavlo Khudzik, 29, Ukrainian footballer (Lviv, Zorya), complications after traffic collision.
- Maria Kryuchkova, 26, Russian gymnast, Olympic bronze medalist (2004), embolism.
- Lars Larsson, 52, Swedish footballer and coach, cancer.
- Tjol Lategan, 89, South African rugby union player.
- Vinod Mehta, 73, Indian magazine and newspaper editor (The Pioneer, Outlook), multiple organ failure.
- Ivan Messmer, 83, Canadian politician.
- Sam Simon, 59, American writer, producer and director (The Simpsons, Cheers, The Drew Carey Show), colorectal cancer.
- Gerardo Sofovich, 77, Argentine actor, director and television presenter, heart failure.
- Lew Soloff, 71, American jazz trumpeter (Blood, Sweat & Tears), heart attack.
- Joy Tamblin, 89, British WRAF officer.
- Thadeus Wierucki, 80, Belgian cyclist.

=== 9 ===
- Rico Alaniz, 95, Mexican-born American actor (The Life and Legend of Wyatt Earp).
- H. H. ter Balkt, 76, Dutch poet.
- Jon Bridgman, 84, American historian.
- Jerry Brightman, 61, American pedal steel guitarist (Buck Owens).
- Flabba, 38, South African rapper, stabbed.
- Gene Gene the Dancing Machine, 82, American stagehand and performer (The Gong Show), diabetes.
- Jack Harte, 94, Irish politician, Senator (1973–1992).
- Lü Houmin, 86, Chinese photographer, cancer.
- Paul Kalanithi, 37, Indian-born American neurosurgeon and writer (When Breath Becomes Air), lung cancer.
- Wayne Kemp, 73, American country music singer and songwriter.
- Otar Koberidze, 90, Georgian actor and film director.
- P. A. Sampath Kumar, 63, Indian New Testament scholar.
- Jiří Matoušek, 51, Czech mathematician.
- Stanislav Melnyk, 53, Ukrainian politician, member of the Verkhovna Rada (2006–2012), suicide by gunshot.
- Windell Middlebrooks, 36, American actor (Body of Proof, The Suite Life on Deck, Scrubs), pulmonary embolism.
- James Molyneaux, Baron Molyneaux of Killead, 94, Northern Irish politician, UK MP for South Antrim (1970–1983) and Lagan Valley (1983–1997), member of the House of Lords (since 1997), leader of UUP (1979–1995).
- Jim Nelson, 77, Irish hurling manager (Antrim).
- Juanita Morrow Nelson, 91, American civil rights activist.
- Frei Otto, 89, German architect and structural engineer, winner of the Pritzker Architecture Prize (2015).
- Rigoberto Paredes, 67, Honduran poet and essayist.
- Mukhammat Sabirov, 82, Russian engineer and politician, Prime Minister of Tatarstan (1991–1995).
- Lou Silverstone, 90, American comedy writer (Mad, Cracked).
- John Paskin Taylor, 86, British field hockey player, bronze medalist at the 1952 Summer Olympics.
- Edward Wiggins, 81, American politician, heart failure.
- Notable French people killed in the Villa Castelli helicopter collision:
  - Florence Arthaud, 57, sailor
  - Camille Muffat, 25, swimmer, Olympic gold medalist (2012)
  - Alexis Vastine, 28, boxer, Olympic bronze medalist (2008)

=== 10 ===
- Fred Fredericks, 85, American cartoonist (Mandrake the Magician).
- David B. Frohnmayer, 74, American attorney, Oregon Attorney General (1981–1991), President of the University of Oregon (1994–2009), prostate cancer.
- Richard Glatzer, 63, American director, writer and producer (Still Alice, America's Next Top Model), amyotrophic lateral sclerosis.
- Vic Harris, 69, British snooker player, pneumonia.
- Harry A. Hoffner, 80, American hittitologist.
- Mohammed Kaliel, Nigerian army officer and politician.
- Ian MacDonald Lightbody, 93, Scottish-born Hong Kong civil servant.
- Allan Lurie, 91, American voice actor (The Jetsons, Metal Gear Solid).
- Sadashivrao Dadoba Mandlik, 80, Indian politician.
- Tim Rucks, 54, American football player and coach (North Park, Carthage), heart attack.
- Meena Shah, 78, Indian badminton player.
- Claude Sitton, 89, American Pulitzer Prize-winning newspaper reporter, heart failure.
- Kenneth Smales, 87, British cricketer and football administrator.
- R. Marthanda Varma, 93, Indian neurosurgeon.
- Stuart Wagstaff, 90, British-born Australian entertainer, complications from pulmonary fibrosis.
- Margaret Wellington, 88, British Olympic swimmer.
- John Howard Wilson, 85, Scottish rugby union player.

=== 11 ===
- William Beckley, 85, American actor (Dynasty).
- Billy Block, 59, American musician, melanoma.
- Walter Burkert, 84, German academic and author (Homo Necans).
- Mayr Facci, 87, Brazilian Olympic basketball player.
- Tony Fenton, 53, Irish radio presenter, prostate cancer.
- Jimmy Greenspoon, 67, American keyboard player and composer (Three Dog Night), melanoma.
- Marni Hodgkin, 97, American-born British book editor.
- Martin H:son Holmdahl, 91, Swedish academic.
- Gerald Hurst, 77, American chemist and fire investigator.
- Georges Mamelonet, 60, Canadian politician, traffic collision.
- Al McCann, 85, Canadian sports broadcaster (CFRN).
- Don McLeod, 68, Canadian ice hockey player (Houston Aeros, Vancouver Blazers, Calgary Cowboys).
- Christopher Morris, 72, English accountant.
- Harri Pritchard-Jones, 81, Welsh writer, critic and psychiatrist.
- Janice Rebibo, 65, American-born Israeli poet, cancer.
- Alejandro Rebollo Álvarez-Amandi, 80, Spanish lawyer, civil servant and politician, member of the Congress of Deputies (1986–1993).
- Keith Roberts, 83, New Zealand rugby footballer.
- Carlo Ubaldo Rossi, 56, Italian composer and music producer, traffic collision.
- Inger Sitter, 85, Norwegian painter and graphic artist.
- Allen Stanton, 90, American music executive.
- Ralph Taeger, 78, American actor (Hondo, Klondike, Acapulco).
- Arthur Thrall, 88, American painter and printmaker.
- Don Weeks, 76, American radio host (WGY).
- Dell Williams, 92, American businesswoman and actress.

=== 12 ===
- Harith al-Dhari, 74, Iraqi Sunni Arab cleric, chairman of the Association of Muslim Scholars.
- Bob Anderson, 79, American baseball player (Chicago Cubs).
- Ray Arnett, 97, American choreographer and stage director (Liberace).
- Willie Barrow, 90, American civil rights activist.
- Dimitar Bobchev, 88, Bulgarian Olympic cyclist.
- Erol Büyükburç, 79, Turkish composer and singer.
- Carol C. Cleven, 86, American politician.
- Geoff Coffin, 90, English footballer (Chester City).
- Wolfgang Fikentscher, 86, German jurist.
- Delfi Galbiati, 70, Uruguayan actor.
- Michael Graves, 80, American architect.
- Magda Guzmán, 83, Mexican actress, heart attack.
- Eddie Hice, 85, American stuntman (Glory, Star Trek, Big Momma's House).
- John Horvath, 90, Hungarian-born American mathematician.
- Sulo Leppänen, 99, Finnish Olympic wrestler.
- Harry Mortenson, 84, American politician.
- Oleksandr Peklushenko, 60, Ukrainian politician, governor of Zaporizhia Oblast.
- Odell Pollard, 87, American politician.
- Sir Terry Pratchett, 66, British author (Discworld), posterior cortical atrophy.
- Ron Przybylinski, 61, American meteorologist, cancer.
- Robert L. Saucy, 84, American theologian.
- S. Siddalingaiah, 79, Indian film director (Bangaarada Manushya).
- Helga Sonck-Majewski, 98, Finnish artist
- Alice Teichova, 94, Austrian-born British economic historian.
- Sir Jerry Wiggin, 78, British politician, MP for Weston-super-Mare (1969–1997).
- Alan Wilkinson, 90, New Zealand footballer.

=== 13 ===
- Daevid Allen, 77, Australian musician (Soft Machine, Gong).
- Lilian Bader, 97, British WAAF aircraftwoman and teacher.
- Frank Chauvin, 81, Canadian humanitarian, lung cancer and chronic obstructive pulmonary disease.
- George Connell, 84, Canadian academic and biochemist, President of the University of Toronto (1984–1990).
- Inge Eriksen, 79, Danish writer.
- Irwin Hasen, 96, American cartoonist (Dondi).
- J. J. Hinchion, 88, Irish Gaelic footballer.
- Suzette Jordan, 40, Indian anti-rape campaigner, meningoencephalitis.
- Gretchen Kafoury, 72, American civil servant and politician, member of the Oregon House of Representatives (1977–1982).
- Zofia Kielan-Jaworowska, 89, Polish paleobiologist, winner of the Prize of the Foundation for Polish Science (2005).
- Adrian Malone, 78, British documentary filmmaker (The Ascent of Man).
- Ismaïla Manga, 57, Senegalese painter.
- Lance Mann, 84, Australian sprinter and football player.
- Paddington Mhondoro, 28, Zimbabwean cricketer, traffic collision.
- Meyera Oberndorf, 74, American politician, Mayor of Virginia Beach, Virginia (1988–2009), Alzheimer's disease.
- Everett Osmond, 78, Canadian politician.
- Martin Petzoldt, 68, German theologian.
- Jeff Rees, 94, British WWII RAF officer and Distinguished Flying Cross recipient.
- Al Rosen, 91, American baseball player (Cleveland Indians).
- Jack Lund Schofield, 91, American politician, member of the Nevada Assembly (1970–1974) and Senate (1974–1978).
- Lia van Leer, 90, Romanian-born Israeli film archive pioneer.
- Maria Vicol, 79, Romanian foil fencer.
- Harvey Wedeen, 86, American classical pianist.
- Vincent Wong, 87, British actor (Doctor Who, Die Another Day, Pink Floyd – The Wall).

=== 14 ===
- Graham Avery, 85, New Zealand track cyclist.
- Helen Banks, 87, American animal welfare activist.
- Rene Cailliet, 97, American physician.
- L. S. Cousins, 72, British scholar in Buddhist studies.
- Nino Cristofori, 85, Italian senator, Minister of Labor and Social Security.
- Stuart Croft, 44, British filmmaker and educator, heart failure.
- Rosalind Dallas, 66, British television graphic designer.
- John C. Daniels, 78, American politician, Mayor of New Haven, Connecticut (1990–1993).
- Ana María Giunta, 72, Argentine actress, respiratory disease.
- Milton Huddart, 54, English rugby league footballer (Whitehaven), heart attack.
- Bodys Isek Kingelez, 67, Congolese sculptor.
- Liezl Martinez, 47, Filipino actress, breast cancer.
- Ib Melchior, 97, Danish-born American author and screenwriter (Death Race 2000, Robinson Crusoe on Mars).
- Ogygian, 31, American Thoroughbred racehorse, euthanized after complications from colic.
- Robert Plonsey, 90, American biomedical engineer.
- Valentin Rasputin, 77, Russian writer.
- Johan Chr. Schønheyder, 100, Norwegian orienteer and sports official.
- Joseph H. Young, 92, American federal judge.
- Therezinha Zerbini, 86, Brazilian attorney and activist.

=== 15 ===
- Antonio Betancort, 78, Spanish footballer (Real Madrid, national team).
- Daniel Caldwell, 79, American actor and drama teacher, Alzheimer's disease.
- Collins Chabane, 54, South African politician, Minister of Public Service and Administration (since 2014), traffic collision.
- Robert Clatworthy, 87, British sculptor.
- Narayan Desai, 90, Indian Gandhian and writer.
- Luciano Ercoli, 85, Italian producer and film director (Death Walks on High Heels, Death Walks at Midnight, Killer Cop).
- Sally Forrest, 86, American dancer and actress (Rawhide), cancer.
- Curtis Gans, 77, American activist and writer, lung cancer.
- Krishna Kalle, 74, Indian playback singer.
- Daryl McClure, 68, Australian politician, member of the Victorian Legislative Assembly for Bendigo (1973–1982).
- Norman Minnaar, 57, South African cricketer.
- Mike Moroney, 81, Australian Olympic athlete.
- Bob Parlocha, 76, American jazz radio personality, heart attack.
- David Peacock, 76, British archaeologist.
- Mike Porcaro, 59, American bassist (Toto), complications from amyotrophic lateral sclerosis.
- Rallabandi Kavitha Prasad, 53, Indian poet and civil servant, heart and renal failure.
- Eusebiu Ștefănescu, 70, Romanian actor, brain cancer.
- Bob Toneff, 84, American football player (San Francisco 49ers, Washington Redskins).
- Fritz Wegner, 90, Austrian-born British illustrator.
- Kim Welshons, 64, American synchronized swimmer, pancreatic cancer.
- Xu Caihou, 71, Chinese general, Vice-chairman of the Central Military Commission, bladder cancer.
- Eric Yeo, 78, Singaporean Olympic water polo player.

=== 16 ===
- Bruce Crump, 57, American rock drummer (Molly Hatchet).
- Eric Denham, 85, British Olympic sailor.
- Miguel Donoso Pareja, 82, Ecuadorian writer, Parkinson's disease.
- Buddy Elias, 89, German-born Swiss actor (Sunshine, The Monuments Men).
- William B. Ewald Jr., 89, American speechwriter (Dwight Eisenhower) and historian, respiratory failure.
- Andy Fraser, 62, British musician (John Mayall & the Bluesbreakers, Free) and songwriter ("All Right Now", "Every Kinda People"), heart attack.
- Chet Giermak, 86, American basketball player (William & Mary), stroke.
- Jack Haley, 51, American basketball player (Chicago Bulls), heart disease.
- Jean Hardisty, 69, American political scientist, lymphoma.
- Arthur A. Hartman, 89, American diplomat, Ambassador to France (1977–1981) and the Soviet Union (1981–1987), complications after leg surgery.
- Norman Johnston, 96, American architect.
- Lev Kuznetsov, 84, Russian Soviet Olympic fencer.
- Marcella Leach, 89, American victim's rights activist.
- Jackson Kasanga Mulwa, 72–73, Kenyan judge and politician, MP for Makueni (1969–1983).
- D. K. Ravi, 35, Indian IAS officer, suicide by hanging.
- Bert Rigg, 91, Australian cricketer.
- Don Robertson, 92, American songwriter.
- Allan Rowe, 58, Canadian politician, MLA for Dartmouth South (since 2013), aneurysm.
- Gustavo Selva, 88, Italian journalist and politician.
- Braydon Smith, 23, Australian boxer, WBC youth silver featherweight champion, brain haemorrhage following bout.
- Janet Taylor Spence, 91, American psychologist.
- Max Stenbeck, 30, American-born Swedish financier and businessman, complications from diabetes.
- Nazmi Yükselen, 89, Turkish folk singer.

=== 17 ===
- Ashley Adams, 59, Australian Paralympic shooter, traffic collision.
- Moustapha Alassane, 73, Nigerien film director.
- Ameerjan, 73, Indian film director.
- Bob Appleyard, 90, English cricketer (Yorkshire, national team).
- Deacon Chiu, 90, Hong Kong entrepreneur, founded Far East Bank.
- Pat Eatock, 77, Australian indigenous rights activist.
- Fang Ziyi, 98, Chinese major general.
- Raymond D. Fowler, 84, American psychologist.
- Antonio Dorado Soto, 83, Spanish Roman Catholic prelate, Bishop of Guadix (1970–1973), Cádiz y Ceuta (1973–1993) and Málaga (1993–2008).
- Marguerite Harbert, 91, American billionaire and philanthropist.
- Kuniyoshi Kaneko, 78, Japanese painter, illustrator and photographer, heart failure.
- William L. Lanier, 88, American politician.
- Frank Perris, 83, Canadian motorcycle road racer.
- Alan Richardson, 74, Australian VFL footballer (Richmond, South Melbourne).
- Tom Schneider, 68, American basketball coach.
- Derek Smith, 87, British television producer (Top Gear).
- Shaw Taylor, 90, British actor and TV presenter.
- Guido Zappa, 99, Italian mathematician.

=== 18 ===
- Ramesh Chandra Bhanja, 76, Indian Oriya poet.
- David Bird, 55, American financial journalist, drowned. (body found on this date)
- Samuel Charters, 85, American music historian and musician, myelodysplastic syndrome.
- Chiang Chung-ling, 92, Taiwanese general and politician, Minister of Defense (1994–1999), heart failure.
- Roy Doty, 92, American cartoonist and illustrator.
- Raymond Gilloz, 83, French Olympic speed skater.
- Richard Gruenther, 90, American Olympic modern pentathlete (1948).
- Harry Heijnen, 74, Dutch footballer (ADO, national team).
- Thomas Hopko, 75, American Eastern Orthodox priest and theologian.
- Ciro Imparato, 52, Italian voice actor and writer.
- Richard Impola, 91, Finnish-born American translator.
- H. Allen Jerkens, 85, American horse trainer.
- Abdel Karim al-Khaiwani, 50, Yemeni politician and journalist, murdered.
- Skip Norman, 81, American filmmaker and visual anthropologist, cancer.
- Grace Ogot, 84, Kenyan writer and politician.
- Providencia Paredes, 90, Dominican Republic-born American personal assistant of Jacqueline Kennedy Onassis.
- Roberto Parga, 78, Uruguayan judge, member of the Supreme Court (2000–2007).
- Sir Don Rowlands, 88, New Zealand rower.
- Oleg Sakirkin, 49, Kazakh Olympic triple jumper (2000).
- Lyle E. Schaller, 91, American church consultant and writer.
- Bernice Steadman, 89, American aviator, member of Mercury 13 team, co-founder of the International Women's Air & Space Museum.
- Zhao Dayu, 54, Chinese footballer (Guangzhou, national team), liver cancer.

=== 19 ===
- Michel Albert, 85, French economist.
- Margarete Bagshaw, 50, American artist, brain tumor.
- Yosef Ben-Jochannan, 96, American writer and historian.
- Carlos Mijares Bracho, 84, Mexican architect.
- Shelby Brewer, 78, American nuclear engineer and physicist, complications from pneumonia.
- Malacrianza, 16, Costa Rican fighting bull, cardiac arrest.
- Michael Brown, 65, American musician (The Left Banke) and songwriter ("Walk Away Renée"), heart failure.
- Marilyn Durham, 84, American author.
- Gus Douglass, 88, American politician, West Virginia Commissioner of Agriculture (1965–1989, 1993–2013), fall.
- David Harrison, 88, English zoologist (Harrison Institute).
- Gerda van der Kade-Koudijs, 91, Dutch sprint athlete, Olympic gold medalist (1948).
- Peter Katin, 84, British pianist.
- Leandra Becerra Lumbreras, 127?, Mexican longevity claimant, unverified oldest living person.
- Steve Mokone, 82, South African footballer (Heracles Almelo).
- Ken Owen, 80, South African journalist and editor.
- Irma Palmieri, 83, Venezuelan film and television actress.
- Safet Plakalo, 65, Bosnian playwright and poet.
- Stanislav Prýl, 72, Czech Olympic bronze medallist ice hockey player (1964).
- Mordecai Roshwald, 93, Polish-born American author (Level 7).
- Danny Schechter, 72, American journalist and filmmaker, pancreatic cancer.
- Leslie Stanbridge, 94, British Anglican priest, Archdeacon of York (1972–1988).
- Shōtarō Suga, 42, Japanese television writer (Darker than Black, The Seven Deadly Sins, Ghost in the Shell: Stand Alone Complex).
- Vernon Treweeke, 76, Australian painter.
- Eino Uusitalo, 90, Finnish politician, Deputy Prime Minister (1979–1982).

=== 20 ===
- Arabi Awwad, 87, Palestinian politician.
- Jim Berry, 83, American cartoonist (Berry's World).
- Eva Burrows, 85, Australian Salvation Army General (1986–1993).
- María del Socorro Bustamante, 60, Colombian lawyer and politician, Senator (1994–2002).
- Cincinnati Red, 40, American professional wrestler (EWF), heart attack.
- A. James Clark, 87, American billionaire engineer, heart failure.
- Mary Clarke, 91, British dance critic.
- Lisa Colagrossi, 49, American news anchor (WABC), brain aneurysm.
- Ellen Conford, 73, American children's writer, heart ailment.
- Daniel Donahue, 91, American baseball team owner (Atlanta Braves).
- Charles T. Epps Jr., 70, American politician, heart attack.
- Malcolm Fraser, 84, Australian politician, Prime Minister (1975–1983).
- Walter Grauman, 93, American director (633 Squadron, Murder, She Wrote).
- Harley Hisner, 88, American baseball player (Boston Red Sox).
- Bud Ings, 89, Canadian politician (Legislative Assembly of Prince Edward Island).
- Paul Jeffrey, 81, American jazz saxophonist.
- Robert Kastenmeier, 91, American politician, member of United States House of Representatives from Wisconsin (1959–1991), heart failure.
- Josef Mikoláš, 77, Czech ice hockey player, world championship silver medalist (1961).
- Eddie Mulheron, 72, Scottish footballer (Clyde, Durban United).
- Joe O'Malley, 83, American football player (Pittsburgh Steelers).
- A. J. Pero, 55, American drummer (Twisted Sister, Adrenaline Mob), heart attack.
- Sir Russell Pettigrew, 94, New Zealand businessman and sports administrator.
- Krishnarao Sable, 92, Indian Marathi folk singer-songwriter.
- François Schlechter, 81, Luxembourgian Olympic wrestler.
- Zoltán Szilárd, 84, Hungarian swimmer.
- John Virgil Singleton Jr., 97, American federal judge.
- Petr Vopěnka, 79, Czech mathematician and politician.
- Gregory Walcott, 87, American actor (Plan 9 from Outer Space, Norma Rae, Every Which Way but Loose).
- Gerald Lee Warren, 84, American journalist, White House deputy press secretary.
- Viktor Viktorovych Yanukovych, 33, Ukrainian politician, People's Deputy (2006–2014), drowned.

=== 21 ===
- Perro Aguayo Jr., 35, Mexican professional wrestler (AAA), stroke from vertebral artery dissection.
- Ishaya Bakut, 67, Nigerian military Governor of Benue State (1986–1987).
- Joan Barr, 75, American politician.
- Chuck Bednarik, 89, American NFL Hall of Fame football player (Philadelphia Eagles).
- Miriam Bienstock, 92, American record company executive (Atlantic Records).
- James C. Binnicker, 76, American air force officer, Chief Master Sergeant (1986–1990).
- Betty Brey, 83, American Olympic swimmer (1956), heart attack.
- Roland Clement, 102, American conservationist, anti-DDT advocate, Vice President of the National Audubon Society (1967–1977).
- Kitty Cone, 70, American disability rights activist, pancreatic cancer.
- Milen Dobrev, 35, Bulgarian weightlifter, Olympic gold medalist (2004), heart attack.
- John Dymoke, 88, British noble, Queen's Champion.
- Hans Erni, 106, Swiss painter, designer and sculptor.
- Jack Ford, 67, American politician, Mayor of Toledo, Ohio (2002–2005).
- Malachy John Goltok, 49, Nigerian Roman Catholic prelate, Bishop of Bauchi (since 2011).
- Jørgen Ingmann, 89, Danish musician ("Apache"), 1963 Eurovision Song Contest winner.
- Jack E. Jett, 58, American talk show host, heart attack.
- Yusufali Kechery, 81, Indian poet and film producer.
- Vince Kendrick, 63, American football player (Atlanta Falcons), cancer.
- Arnošt Klimčík, 69, Czechoslovak Olympic silver medallist handball player (1972).
- John Litvack, 69, American television producer (Smallville, Hill Street Blues) and director (Guiding Light), complications following heart surgery.
- John Walter Guerrier Lund, 102, English psychologist.
- Hector Macpherson Jr., 96, American politician, member of the Oregon Senate (1971–1974).
- Ralph McGill, 64, American football player (San Francisco 49ers, New Orleans Saints).
- Sir Hal Miller, 86, British politician, MP for Bromsgrove and Redditch (1974–1983) and Bromsgrove (1983–1992).
- Jack Peltason, 91, American scholar, President of the University of California (1992–1995), Parkinson's disease.
- Anacleto Pinto, 67, Portuguese Olympic long-distance runner.
- Thomas Scallen, 89, American businessman.
- Sir James Spicer, 89, British politician, MP for West Dorset (1974–1997).
- Divaldo Suruagy, 78, Brazilian politician, Governor of Alagoas (1975–1978, 1983–1986, 1995–1997).
- Sharon Tandy, 71, South African singer.
- Jackie Trent, 74, English singer-songwriter and actress.
- Alberta Watson, 60, Canadian actress (La Femme Nikita, 24, The Prince and Me), cancer.
- Robert Williams, 89, English chemist.
- Warren Womble, 95, American basketball coach.

=== 22 ===
- Arkady Arkanov, 81, Russian writer and satirist.
- Murray S. Blum, 85, American entomologist.
- Petar Hadži Boškov, 86, Macedonian sculptor.
- Horst Buhtz, 91, German football player (Torino) and manager.
- William Campbell, 79, American politician, member of the California Senate (1976–1990) and Assembly (1966–1974).
- Derek Chinnery, 89, English radio controller (BBC Radio 1).
- Sir Anthony Garner, 88, British political organiser.
- Lyle Gramley, 88, American economist.
- Tom Koch, 89, American comedy writer (Mad).
- Bernadett Kőszegi, 56, Hungarian Olympic volleyball player.
- Helen Landis, 92, English singer and actress.
- Peter Pišťanek, 54, Slovak writer, suicide by drug overdose.
- Norman Scribner, 79, American choral conductor.
- Julieta Marín Torres, 71, Mexican politician, MP for Puebla (2009–2012), lung cancer.
- J. Terry Williams, 84, American film editor (The Russians Are Coming, the Russians Are Coming, Family Plot, Raise the Titanic).

=== 23 ===
- Tahira Mazhar Ali, 91, Pakistani women's rights activist.
- Günter Asser, 89, German mathematician.
- Gian Vittorio Baldi, 84, Italian director and producer.
- William DeLoach Cope, 93, American politician.
- Roy Douglas, 107, British composer.
- Earl Harris, 73, American politician, member of the Indiana House of Representatives (since 1982).
- Herberto Hélder, 84, Portuguese poet.
- Don Hutt, 62, American football player.
- Søren Kam, 93, Danish Nazi war criminal.
- Lee Kuan Yew, 91, Singaporean politician, Prime Minister (1959–1990), pneumonia.
- Ted Lester, 92, English cricketer (Yorkshire).
- Lil' Chris, 24, British singer-songwriter, actor and television personality, suicide by hanging.
- Michael Laurence, 80, Australian actor and television producer (Return to Eden).
- Bobby Lowther, 91, American basketball player and athlete (LSU Tigers), All-American (1946).
- Carla Macelloni, 78, Italian actress (Anna of Brooklyn).
- Lajos Molnár, 68, Hungarian physician, Minister of Health (2006–2007).
- Iván Nagy, 77, Hungarian-born American director.
- Nick Peters, 75, American journalist (Sacramento Bee) and baseball beat writer (San Francisco Giants), recipient of the J. G. Taylor Spink Award (2009).
- Noreen Rice, 79, Northern Irish artist.
- Alan Seymour, 87, Australian playwright (The One Day of the Year).
- Steven Smith, 65, American tea company founder, liver cancer.
- LaVern Torgeson, 86, American football player (Detroit Lions, Washington Redskins).
- Frans Tumbuan, 76, Indonesian actor.
- Geoff Tunbridge, 82, Australian VFL football player (Melbourne).

=== 24 ===
- Augusto Arenas, 86, Chilean footballer.
- Yehuda Avner, 86, Israeli diplomat, Ambassador to the United Kingdom and Ireland (1983–1988), and Australia (1992–1996), cancer.
- Malli Mastan Babu, 40, Indian mountain climber, climbing incident.
- Nico Baracchi, 57, Swiss bobsledder.
- Bryan Bartley, 86, New Zealand engineer and inventor.
- Richard Butson, 92, Canadian explorer and physician, recipient of the George Cross.
- Allan Charleston, 81, Australian water polo player.
- Scott Clendenin, 47, American musician (Death, Control Denied).
- Otto Frello, 90, Danish artist and illustrator.
- R. Geraint Gruffydd, 86, Welsh celtist.
- Jeff Hennessy, 85, American trampoline coach.
- Ian Isles, 96, British WWII army officer and actuary.
- Wladimir Jan Kochanski, 79, American pianist.
- Samuli Mansikka, 36, Finnish mountaineer, fall.
- Roger Mayer, 88, American film industry executive.
- Frank Megaro, 81, American politician.
- Monte Merrick, 65, American screenwriter (Memphis Belle, Mr. Baseball, 8 Seconds) and author, cancer.
- Albert Probst, 83, German politician.
- Louis Renner, 88, American Jesuit priest, historian and academic (University of Alaska Fairbanks), specialist in Catholic history in Alaska.
- Moncef Ben Salem, 62, Tunisian politician.
- Slamet Abdul Sjukur, 79, Indonesian musician and composer.
- Peter Stichbury, 91, New Zealand potter.
- Robert Folger Thorne, 94, American botanist.
- Kees van Vugt, 85, Dutch Olympic rower.
- Notable German people killed in the crash of Germanwings Flight 9525:
  - Oleg Bryjak, 54, Kazakh-born opera singer
  - Maria Radner, 33, opera singer

=== 25 ===
- Indra Bania, 73, Indian actor.
- Dick Bond, 93, American politician, member of the Washington House of Representatives (1975–1987).
- George Fischbeck, 92, American television weatherman (KABC).
- Ivo Garrani, 91, Italian actor (Black Sunday, Hercules, Caliber 9).
- Martyn Goff, 91, British bookseller, administrator of the Man Booker Prize.
- Tommy Maher, 92, Irish hurler.
- Jimmy McGill, 68, Scottish footballer (Huddersfield Town, Hull City).
- Richard O. Moore, 95, American poet and filmmaker (Louisiana Diary).
- Jeannette Obstoj, 65, British lyricist (Break Every Rule).
- Jim Phillips, 79, American football player (Los Angeles Rams, Minnesota Vikings).
- Douglas Quadling, 89, English mathematician.
- Pedro Reyes, 53, Spanish comedian, humorist and actor, heart attack.
- Bill Slayback, 67, American baseball player (Detroit Tigers).
- Allen Sheppard, Baron Sheppard of Didgemere, 82, British industrialist and politician.
- Smart Strike, 23, Canadian Thoroughbred racehorse, euthanized.
- Ron Suart, 94, English football player and manager (Chelsea).
- Joris Van Hauthem, 51, Belgian politician (Vlaams Belang), colorectal cancer.
- Loy Young, 92, American college football (Dickinson State) and basketball (Chadron State) coach.

=== 26 ===
- Ennio Appignanesi, 89, Italian Roman Catholic prelate, Archbishop of Potenza-Muro Lucano-Marsico Nuovo (1993–2001).
- Anne Bannister, 78, British psychotherapist.
- Friedrich L. Bauer, 90, German computer scientist.
- Concern, 24, American Thoroughbred racehorse. (death announced on this date)
- Dinkha IV, 79, Iraqi Catholicos-Patriarch of the Assyrian Church of the East (since 1976).
- Judith Duncan, 51, New Zealand academic, complications from motor neuron disease.
- Albert Irvin, 92, British abstract artist.
- Hermann Knoll, 83, Austrian Olympic hockey player (1952) and Olympic ice hockey player (1956, 1964).
- Paty Ripple Kyndiah, 86, Indian politician.
- Alonso Llano Ruiz, 83, Colombian Roman Catholic prelate, Bishop of Istmina-Tadó (1993–2010), leukemia.
- Karl Moik, 76, Austrian television presenter (Musikantenstadl).
- Ian Moir, 71, Scottish footballer (Manchester United, Wrexham), cancer.
- John Renbourn, 70, British guitarist (Pentangle), heart attack.
- Fred Robsahm, 71, Norwegian actor (Flashback).
- Luís Miguel Rocha, 39, Portuguese author, cancer.
- John D. States, 89, American doctor and automotive safety advocate, heart failure.
- J. Karen Thomas, 50, American actress (Drop Dead Diva, Nashville, Sunset Beach), multiple myeloma.
- Tomas Tranströmer, 83, Swedish poet and translator, Nobel Prize laureate in Literature (2011), stroke.
- Naomi Weisstein, 76, American psychologist and writer.

=== 27 ===
- Craft Akard, 98, American politician.
- Bruno Barabani, 82, Brazilian Olympic weightlifter.
- Daundre Barnaby, 24, Jamaican-born Canadian Olympic runner (2012), drowning.
- Rik Battaglia, 88, Italian actor (Duck, You Sucker!).
- Pauline Brockless, 85, English opera singer.
- Josefino Cenizal, 95, Filipino composer, director and actor.
- B.J. Crosby, 62, American singer and actress (Smokey Joe's Cafe), complications from diabetes and a stroke.
- Neville Denton, 80, New Zealand rugby league player.
- Claus Dunne, 70, Irish hurler (Kilkenny).
- Akpanoluo Ikpong Ikpong Ette, Nigerian physicist.
- Carlos Falchi, 70, Brazilian-born American accessories designer.
- William W. Hallo, 87, German-born American professor of Assyriology and Babylonian literature.
- Johnny Helms, 80, American jazz trumpet player and bandleader.
- Robert V. Hine, 93, American author and historian.
- Hot Rod Hundley, 80, American basketball player (Los Angeles Lakers) and television broadcaster (Utah Jazz), Alzheimer's disease.
- Annelise Høegh, 66, Norwegian politician, MP for Oslo (1985–2001).
- Yusuf Mohamed Ismail, 56, Somali diplomat, Ambassador to Switzerland (since 2008), permanent representative to the United Nations (since 2008), shot.
- Janet J. Joyce, 75, American politician.
- Bob Lewis, 90, American politician, member of the Washington Senate (1973–1981).
- Fillie Lyckow, 80, Swedish actress (Du är inte klok Madicken, Varuhuset).
- Janet L. Norwood, 91, American statistician, Commissioner of the U.S. Bureau of Labor Statistics (1979–1991), Alzheimer's disease.
- Michael Rush, 65, American museum director, pancreatic cancer.
- T. Sailo, 93, Indian brigadier and politician, Chief Minister of Mizoram (1978, 1979–1984), heart failure.
- Sarbi, 12, Australian war canine, brain cancer.
- Walter Schuck, 94, German WWII fighter ace.
- Anthony Scrivener, 79, British lawyer, complications from Parkinson's disease.
- Gertrud Sigurdsen, 92, Swedish politician, Minister of Social Affairs (1985–1989).
- Amaro Silva, 57, Canadian politician.
- Olga Syahputra, 32, Indonesian actor, comedian, singer and television host, meningitis.
- Mate Trojanović, 84, Croatian rower, Olympic gold medalist (1952).
- George Wang, 96, Taiwanese actor and producer, heart failure.
- Lincoln Wolfenstein, 92, American particle physicist, cancer.
- Susumu Yokota, 54, Japanese musician and composer.

=== 28 ===
- Richard L. Bare, 101, American director and producer (Green Acres, Maverick).
- Leon Bass, 90, American educator and WWII soldier.
- Sarala Birla, 91, Indian educationalist.
- Chuck Brayton, 89, American Collegiate Hall of Fame baseball player and coach (Washington State Cougars).
- Joseph Cassidy, 60, Canadian-born British Anglican priest and academic, Principal of St Chad's College, heart attack.
- Denis Eadie, 98, British WWII army officer and Military Cross recipient.
- Jim Fairburn, 87, Canadian ice hockey player.
- Amos Ford, 98, Belizean-born British forester.
- Gerry Hardstaff, 75, English cricketer, cancer.
- Bjørn Heyn, 86, Norwegian Olympic weightlifter.
- Akhil Mehta, 27, Indian comedian, suicide by jumping.
- Dick Mills, 70, American baseball player (Boston Red Sox), melanoma.
- Bek Nelson, 87, American model and actress.
- Albert Norak, 86, Estonian politician, complications from Parkinson's disease.
- Thomas A. O'Halloran, 83, American particle physicist.
- Miroslav Ondříček, 80, Czech cinematographer (Amadeus, Ragtime, A League of Their Own), BAFTA winner (1986).
- Jerzy Orłowski, 90, Polish footballer.
- Gene Saks, 93, American stage and film director (The Odd Couple, Barefoot in the Park, Brighton Beach Memoirs), Tony winner (1977, 1983, 1985), pneumonia.
- Ronald Stevenson, 87, Scottish composer and pianist.
- Tuti Yusupova, 134?, Uzbekistani longevity claimant, unverified world's oldest person.

=== 29 ===
- Ayla Arslancan, 78, Turkish actress, lung cancer.
- Romany Bain, 91, British show business journalist.
- William Delafield Cook, 79, Australian artist.
- Carmen Lozano Dumler, 93, Puerto Rican United States Army officer.
- Jim LaRue, 89, American football player and coach (Arizona Wildcats).
- Juan Carlos Maccarone, 74, Argentine Roman Catholic prelate, Bishop of Chascomús (1996–1999) and Santiago del Estero (1999–2005).
- David Macklin, 86, British Olympic rower (1952) and local government executive.
- Ian Occleshaw, 87, Australian tennis player and coach.
- Jim Robison, 87, Australian VFL football player (Hawthorn).
- John Sheppard, 93, British car designer.
- Puntsagiin Sükhbat, 50, Mongolian Olympic wrestler.
- Peter Tarsey, 77, British Olympic diver (1956), shot.
- Paul Torgersen, 83, American educator, President of the Virginia Polytechnic Institute and State University (1993–2000).
- Mike Watt, 78, New Zealand Olympic sport shooter (1972).
- Anne Woods, 67, British world gurning champion.

=== 30 ===
- Aleck Che-Mponda, 79, Tanzanian politician and academic.
- Helmut Dietl, 70, German film director (Schtonk!), lung cancer.
- Messias Pereira Donato, 93, Brazilian jurist and academic.
- John Elliott, 83, Jamaican Olympic boxer (1964).
- Walter Gómez, 62, Argentine Olympic boxer.
- Ingrid van Houten-Groeneveld, 93, German-born Dutch astronomer.
- Joan Kagezi, 47, Ugandan lawyer and prosecutor, shot.
- Phyllis R. Klotman, 90, American film theorist and archivist.
- Štěpán Kodeda, 27, Czech orienteering competitor, complications after traffic collision.
- John H. Makin, 71, American economist, cancer.
- Aniceto Molina, 75, Colombian cumbia musician, lung failure.
- Preston Ritter, 65, American drummer (The Electric Prunes), kidney problems.
- Roger Slifer, 60, American comic book writer (Lobo, Transformers).
- Basil Soda, 47, Lebanese fashion designer, cancer.
- Graham Spooner, 82, Australian rules footballer (Fitzroy).
- Donald J. Strait, 96, American major general.
- Trevor Williams, 76, British plant geneticist.
- Leon Wouters, 84, Belgian football player and coach.
- Robert Z'Dar, 64, American film actor and producer (Maniac Cop, Tango & Cash, Samurai Cop).

=== 31 ===
- Albino Bernardini, 97, Italian author and pedagogue.
- Billy Butler, 69, American soul singer.
- Betty Churcher, 84, Australian arts administrator and curator, director of the National Gallery of Australia (1990–1997), cancer.
- T. W. Edwards Jr., 85, American politician.
- Cocoa Fujiwara, 31, Japanese manga author.
- Lada Galina, 81, Bulgarian writer.
- Lalo García, 43, Spanish basketball player (CB Valladolid, national team). (body discovered on this date)
- Carlos Gaviria Díaz, 77, Colombian lawyer and politician, Magistrate of the Constitutional Court (1993–2001), Senator (2006–2010), presidential candidate (2006), respiratory infection.
- Andrew Getty, 47, American heir, intestinal bleeding.
- Riccardo Ingram, 48, American baseball player (Detroit Tigers, Minnesota Twins), brain cancer.
- Ricky Marsh, 88, British journalist.
- Roland Mortier, 94, Belgian scientist.
- Pak Hui-jin, 83, South Korean poet.
- Hanns Peters, 85, German Olympic rower.
- Philip Potter, 93, Dominica Methodist church leader, General Secretary of the World Council of Churches (1972–1984).
- Roy Ralph, 94, British cricketer (Essex).
- Anthony Saxton, 80, British advertising executive.
- Michel Scheuer, 87, German sprint canoer, Olympic gold medallist (1956).
- Sharp Humor, 12, American thoroughbred racehorse, complications from paddock accident.
- Ralph Sharon, 91, British-born American pianist and bandleader (Tony Bennett).
- Scott Suber, 80, American football player (Mississippi State Bulldogs).
- Klaus Tschira, 74, German physicist and entrepreneur, co-founder of SAP.
- Dalibor Vesely, 79, Czech-born British architectural historian.
