= Maksud Ibragimov =

Politician

Maksud Muhidinovich Ibragimov (Tajik: Максуд Мухидинович Ибрагимов; born 3 November 1977, Dushanbe, Tajik SSR) is a Tajikistan-born opposition politician, Chairman of the Russian-registered organization "Youth for the Revival of Tajikistan" and member of the governing board of the opposition coalition New Tajikistan, which includes Group 24.

Up until December 2014, Maksud Ibragimov was a citizen of Russia who renounced his Tajikistan citizenship in 2004. He had been living in Russia for 10 years before establishing the movement "Youth for the Revival of Tajikistan" in October 2014. As part of the New Tajikistan coalition, the movement called for peaceful protests to be held on October 10 in Dushanbe. Reacting to this, Tajikistan announced the movement illegal on October 7 and requested an extradition of Ibragimov from Russia. Complying with the request, Russia's authorities arrested Ibragimov on October 9 but the Russian court denied Tajikistan's request and he was freed on October 11, 2014.

A stream of threats followed this denial of extradition, including threats from Tajik law enforcement services. This was documented in Ibrahimov's statement to the Russian police, which refused to register his complaints. On 26 November 2014, Ibragimov was attacked in Moscow by two persons who left him with 6 knife wounds. His condition was severe but he survived. In December 2014 Ibragimov suddenly discovered that the Russian Federation stripped him of his Russian citizenship.

On 20 January 2015, Ibragimov was arrested by Russian authorities again and immediately extradited to Tajikistan. Ibragimov's Russian lawyer Nikolay Nikolayev said the extradition was illegal and expressed his plans to appeal the case in the European Court of Human Rights. Following the abduction and forced extradition of Maksud Ibrahimov to Tajikistan, the majority of the active members of the Youth Organization for the Revival of Tajikistan sought political asylum in Europe.

In view of evolving circumstances and strategic necessity, and with the consent of the majority of members, an internal agreement was signed in late 2017, according to which the Organization aligned its activities under the political programs of Group 24, a status that continues to this day.

Beginning on January 1, 2018, the Youth Organization for the Revival of Tajikistan and the 'Freedom and Justice' Organization formally aligned their operations under the framework of the Political Movement Group 24, where they have since continued to operate in unison.

In January 2025, the Organization of Tajik Youth for the Revival of Tajikistan declared its independence from the political movement “Group 24” to pursue its own legal, political, and social initiatives. Along with this declaration, the organization implemented leadership changes, appointing Ubaydullo Saidi (Nosirov) as Head of the Organization and Barakatulloi Rahmatullo as Deputy Head.

Subsequently, after an internal leadership transition, the responsibility of chairmanship was transferred to Ubaydullo Saidi (Nosirov), who currently serves as the Head of the Organization of Tajik Youth for the Revival of Tajikistan.

== See also ==
- Umarali Quvvatov - another Tajik opposition politician who became the target of an assassination attempt in March 2015
- Zayd Saidov - Tajik businessman imprisoned for 26 year in 2013 after an attempt to launch a new political party
