= Sharofiddin Gadoev =

Tajik political activist

- Шарофиддин Гадоев
- Born: May 19, 1985 (age 41); Farkhor District, Khatlon Region, Tajikistan
- Citizenship: Tajik
- Occupation: Political activist
- Known for: Opposition activism; associated with Group 24 and the Movement for Reforms and Development of Tajikistan
- Website: tajreform.org

Sharofiddin Gadoev (born 19 May 1985) is a Tajik political activist and opposition figure. He has been associated with the opposition group Group 24 and later with the Movement for Reforms and Development of Tajikistan.

== Political activity ==
Media have reported on Gadoev in connection with Tajik opposition movements and civic initiatives abroad. According to reports, he became the leader of Group 24 after the assassination of the movement’s founder Umarali Kuvvatov in Istanbul in March 2015. In 2018, Tajik and regional media reported on the creation of the Movement for Reforms and Development of Tajikistan, describing Gadoev among its leaders.

== Arrests and international proceedings ==
In 2014, Gadoev was detained in Spain in connection with an extradition request from Tajikistan; Spanish authorities ultimately refused extradition, according to Asia-Plus.

In February 2019, Human Rights Watch reported that Gadoev had been forcibly returned from Russia to Tajikistan and raised concerns about the risk of torture and ill-treatment. Amnesty International also issued a public statement about the case in 2019.

In January 2022, the Office of the United Nations High Commissioner for Human Rights (OHCHR) published an opinion by the UN Working Group on Arbitrary Detention (UNWGAD) regarding the case (Opinion No. 48/2021). The Human Rights Foundation also reported on the UN outcome.

== Reports of pressure on relatives ==
Human Rights Watch has described travel bans and other restrictions affecting relatives of perceived critics of the Tajik government, including cases linked to Gadoev’s family. Radio Free Europe/Radio Liberty (RFE/RL) reported in 2023 that Gadoev’s mother was questioned by Tajik authorities amid broader pressure on relatives of critics in exile.

== Additional coverage ==
Several reports on related events have been published by TajNews (Tajnews.org), including coverage of a visit by Gadoev to Afghanistan and reporting on a detention of a relative in Greece.

== See also ==
- Group 24
- Politics of Tajikistan
