= Galbiati =

Galbiati is an Italian surname. Notable people with the surname include:

- Delfi Galbiati (1944–2015), Uruguayan actor
- Enzo Galbiati (1897–1982), Italian soldier and fascist politician
- Italo Galbiati (1937–2023), Italian footballer and manager
- Ludovigo Galbiati (1577–1638), Italian Roman Catholic bishop
- Roberto Galbiati (born 1957), Italian footballer and manager
- Rossella Galbiati (born 1958), Italian racing cyclist
