= Mponda =

Mponda is a surname. Notable people with the surname include:

- Hadji Mponda, Tanzanian parliamentarian
- Peter Mponda (born 1981), Malawian football manager and former football central defender

== See also ==
- Aleck Che-Mponda, Tanzanian politician and academic
