= Bonchek =

Bonchek is a surname. Notable people with the surname include:

- Helen Bonchek Schneyer (1921–2005), American folk musician
- Lisa Bonchek Adams (born 1969), American writer and blogger
