= Luís Rocha =

Luis Rocha may also refer to:

- Luís Rocha (footballer, born 1986), Portuguese footballer
- Luís Rocha (footballer, born 1993), Portuguese footballer
- Luís Filipe Rocha (born 1947), Portuguese film director, screenwriter and actor
- Luis M. Rocha, Portuguese-American scientist
- Luís Miguel Rocha (1976–2015), Portuguese author, television writer and producer
- Luís Rocha (politician) (1937–2001), Brazilian politician and lawyer
