= Saidnuriddin Shamsiddinov =

Lawyer from Tajikistan

Saidnuriddin Shamsiddinov is a lawyer from Tajikistan. In 2020, Shamsiddinov criticized several prosecutors and judges from the Vakhsh District for allegedly participating in illegal activities. He was subsequently arrested by the Tajik authorities. He was sentenced to 8.5 years in prison on many charges at the end of 2020. An additional eight months were added on in November 2021, on the charge of collaboration with a banned political group called Group 24. Both his lawyer and the group denied any connection.

== Career ==
Until 2017, Shamsiddinov was employed as a bailiff, working in the Khatlon Region. He quit after becoming frustrated with being asked for bribes and started working for a human rights organization.

== Arrest and charges ==
Shamsiddinov made critical posts alleging illegal activities of government officials. These included Facebook posts alleging corruption from officials and a video that was posted on the YouTube channel of the opposition group National Alliance of Tajikistan.

In December 2020, Shamsiddinov was found guilty of fraud, illegal land sales and spreading false information. The charges also included evasion of child support, despite the fact that all child support payments have been paid, "on time and to the satisfaction of ... [his] ex-wife." The trial evidence also included a confession that Shamsiddinov gave after having undergone torture. Shamsiddinov and his family claimed the charges were "politically motivated". Charging troublesome members of civil society with multiple crimes is a common form of political repression in Tajikistan.

In November 2021, prosecutors further charged Shamsiddinov with having links to Group 24, a banned political organization in Tajikistan. The charges carried a maximum sentence of 10 years; however, he was only sentenced to eight more months.

== International response ==
The International Partnership for Human Rights included Shamsiddinov in an op-ed they wrote for Eurasia Review on freedom of the press in Tajikistan. They also included him in a report on Tajikistan for Civicus. The nonprofit group Freedom Now and the law firm Proskauer Rose filed a petition on Shamsiddinov's case for the UN Working Group on Arbitrary Detention.
