= Gruenther =

Gruenther is a surname. Notable people with the surname include:

- Alfred Gruenther (1899–1983), United States Army General
- Richard Gruenther (1924–2015), American pentathlete
