= Helen Banks =

Founder of Second Chance for Greyhounds, a US animal rescue organization

- Born: Helen Mitchell; May 30, 1927; New York City, U.S.
- Died: March 13, 2015 (aged 87)
- Occupation: Animal-rescue worker
- Known for: Founding Second Chance for Greyhounds

Helen Banks (May 30, 1927 – March 13, 2015) born Helen Mitchell in New York City, was an American animal rescue worker and the founder of Second Chance for Greyhounds (SCFG) in 1986, which (it is claimed) rehomed as many as 9,000 former racing greyhounds through 2002. Originally, SCFG operated in Bonita Springs, Florida. She and Second Chance for Greyhounds had been featured in a Life Magazine expose of greyhound racing in 1995.

== Second Chance for Greyhounds ==
At the time of the 1995 expose, Ms. Banks sent to a farm in Bonita Springs, Florida, the greyhounds who had been rescued from the Naples/Ft. Myers race track, while they were waiting adoption. She would dress like a worker at the Track and sneak and take the caged, emaciated dogs. At any time, the rescue farm was full to capacity, with about 35 to 45 greyhounds at any given time. The Life Magazine expose triggered a series of events which thereby exposed her rescue work (to critics of animal advocacy) and made her continuing work very difficult, but not impossible. She continued to lead the operation until her death at age 87.

Ms. Banks was credited having inspired several rescue, shelter, and adoption operations for greyhounds who had been retired from dog racing.

The financial decline of greyhound racing is even more significant in Florida, where twelve of America's 22 remaining operational dog tracks are located. The amount gambled at dog tracks in that state had declined by 72% in the 23 years between 1990 and 2013. A 2013 study commissioned by the Florida legislature found that the state of Florida had lost between $1 million and $3.3 million on greyhound racing in 2012.

Second Chance for Greyhounds of Michigan defines greyhound rescue as an animal welfare activity, not an animal rights position.

"SCfG is a retired racing greyhound welfare organization, not an animal rights organization. It does not take part of political actions or legislation."

== Other activities and personal life ==
Before her humanitarian animal rescue work with greyhounds retired from greyhound racing, she had been a housewife in Connecticut raising 2 daughters and saving many animals. She would often be late for lunch because she would bury road kill along the way.

She was married 3 times, and engaged many more, her 3rd husband, Nate Banks, owned a horse farm in Fairfield, Connecticut. While living on a large farm with animals, she took care of boarded and personal horses. She taught horseback riding for many years, and preferred animals to people. This would be attributed to her upbringing where she lived in a dream world to escape her painful relationship with her mother, and her propensity to attract abusive men into her life, Nate was no exception. We would joke that she got in good shape because she had to do so much work at the farm. During a quarter of a century of animal advocacy, she had rescued many animals who suffered the exploitative intentions of humans. She began her compassionate work with horses whom (while she was still married) she brought back to her farm from slaughterhouses and "killer auctions" in Connecticut and New York. The scope of her concern included rehabilitating injured turtles, deer, and other wildlife. She campaigned against the leghold trap used by hunters, and against use of gas chambers in Connecticut for euthanasia by the Connecticut Humane Society. She also worked vigorously for spay/neuter provisions for dogs/cats and birth control shots for deer, wild horses, and any other animals who had been condemned as "nuisance" animals because their habitat had been lost as a result of human overpopulation, leading to human charges of animal overpopulation. She was a member of the Board of Directors of Marian's Dream for ten years.

== See also ==
- Animal rescue group
- Animal rights
- Animal sanctuary
- Animal welfare
- Greyhound racing in the United States
- Greyhound adoption
