= Lynching of Robert Mallard =

American lynching victim (c. 1911–1948)

Robert Mallard
- Born: 1910 or 1911
- Died: November 20, 1948 (37 years old); Lyons, Georgia, U.S.
- Cause of death: Pistol shot to the chest Lynching
- Other names: Big Duck; Duck
- Occupations: Traveling casket salesman; landowner
- Known for: Lynching victim
- Spouse: Amy James Mallard
- Children: 1

Robert Childs "Big Duck" Mallard (1910 or 1911 – November 20, 1948) was an African American man who was shot and lynched by a group of about 20 members of the Ku Klux Klan in Lyons, Toombs County, Georgia. The people charged with his murder were acquitted by an all-white jury.

== Early life ==
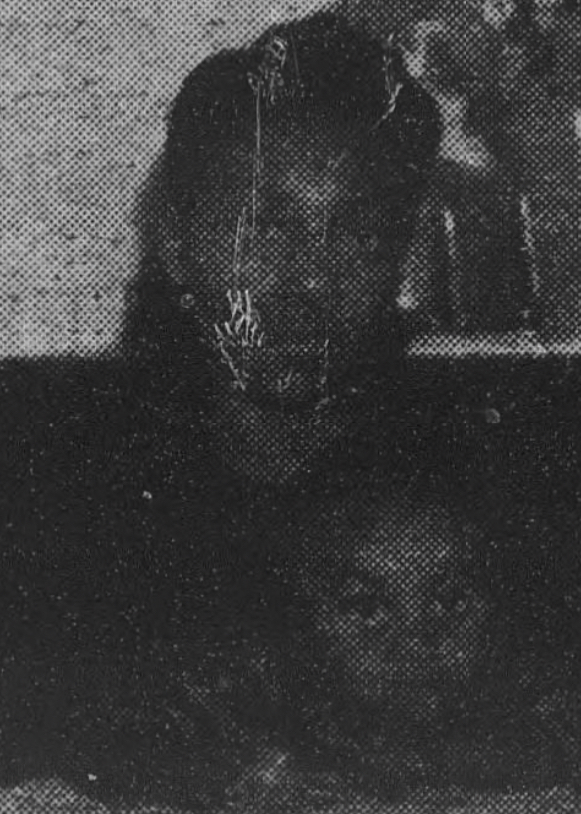
Amy and John Mallard in a 1949 publication

Robert Childs Mallard was born in 1910 or 1911. He was a traveling casket salesman working for the Standard Products Company. Mallard lived on a 35-acre farm on the banks of the Altamaha River, which he gained from the white stepfather-in-law of his wife, Amy James Mallard. He lived with Amy and their 2-year-old son, John. Amy worked as an elementary school teacher.

== Death ==
On the night of November 20, 1948, 2 weeks after he voted in the 1948 Georgia gubernatorial special election, Mallard and Amy were driving home from a fundraiser at an elementary school with John and two of Amy's cousins: Angelina Carter, 13 years old, and William "Tim" Carter, 18 years old, in Lyons, Toombs County, Georgia. Mallard was driving in a new Frazer. The car was stopped by a group of men in white robes—likely members of the Ku Klux Klan. Mallard stopped the car in front of the Providence Baptist Church, and the group shot the vehicle with pistols, which struck Mallard and caused his death. When Sheriff R. E. Gray arrived at the scene, instead of helping Amy, they searched her pocketbook and the vehicle.

== Aftermath ==
After the lynching, Amy, her son, Angelina, and William fled to Savannah, Georgia, moving back and forth between there and Jacksonville, Florida. Robert's brother, Benjamin F. Mallard, who lived in California, informed Theodore L. Redding, the president of the NAACP's Jacksonville branch about the killing. Redding told the NAACP president, Walter White, who spread the information.

Georgia governor Herman Talmadge did not order an investigation by the Georgia Bureau of Investigation. Instead, Talmadge sent two agents to Mallard's funeral on November 27, arresting Amy and charging her for the murder.

After the information was spread, Joseph Goldwasser, a Jewish businessman from Cleveland, began an unofficial investigation. His investigation led police to five people. They surrendered, and two of the men were indicted for the murder; Ku Klux Klan members William L. "Spud" Howell, and Roderick Clifton. After the surrender, fires broke out in Lyons' black business area.

== Trial ==
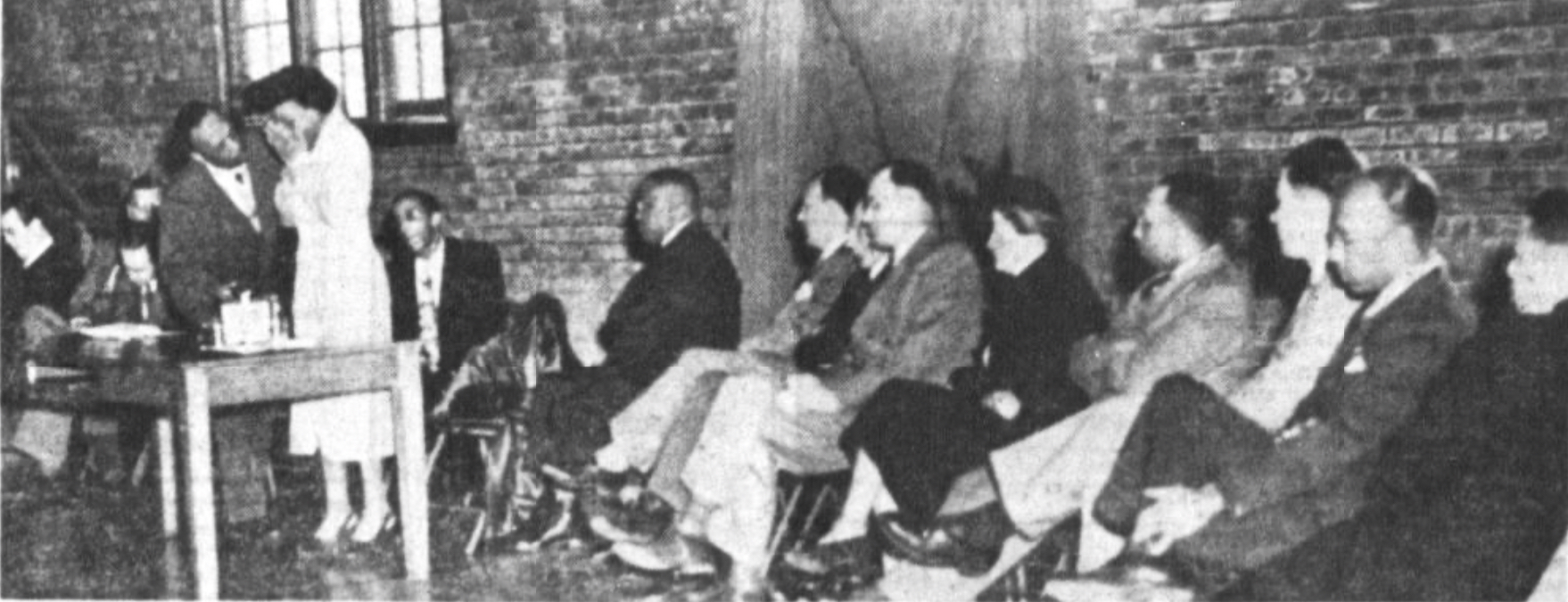
The Robert Mallard trial. Amy (standing; white dress) is crying.

The trial for the murder of Mallard began in the Toombs County Courthouse on January 11, 1949. At the beginning of the trial, Toombs County solicitor William L. Lanier presented Amy as his only piece of evidence. Amy argued that she recognized Howell and Clifton's car during the event. Amy then fell from her chair to the floor and began sobbing. Howell and Clifton's lawyer, Thomas Ross Sharpe, argued that Amy was armed at the time of the killing. He also used character evidence in two ways: first, a subpoena to Joseph Golwasser to testify, and sending two jurors to testify, a move that " defied the notions of jurisprudence". After 25 minutes of deliberation, Howell was acquitted by an all-white jury, and the charges against Clifton, who was severed from the trial, were subsequently dropped in a case of Nolle prosequi.

== Legacy ==
After the trial, Amy took her two children, Doris Byron and John Mallard, went to Baltimore, Maryland and Washington, D.C. with members of the NAACP to protest the decision. On July 4, 1949, Mallard's home in Lyons was allegedly burnt down by Ku Klux Klan members.

Mallard's death led to the creation of the Atlanta Negro Voters League.

Mallard's case was included in the We Charge Genocide petition. Amy and Doris were both signatories.

== See also ==
- African Americans in Georgia
- List of lynching victims in the United States
