= The Last Pope =

2006 novel by Luís Miguel Rocha

- Cover of the English translation
- Author: Luís Miguel Rocha
- Original title: O Último Papa
- Language: Portuguese
- Genre: Thriller
- Publisher: Saída de Emergência
- Publication date: 2006*
- Followed by: The Holy Bullet

The Last Pope (Portuguese: O Último Papa) is a novel by Portuguese author Luís Miguel Rocha, released in 2006.

It is a thriller set thirty years after the death of Pope John Paul I, in which a journalist, Sarah Monteiro, receives menaces connected with the secrets of Vatican City and the Italian secret lodge Propaganda 2. The book focus on the strange death of Pope John Paul I. According to the plot, he was murdered because he was about to replace members of the Holy See that were involved in money laundering business with the Masonic Lodge P2.
