= Umarali Kuvvatov =

Tajik politician and activist (1968–2015)

- Умаралӣ Қувватов
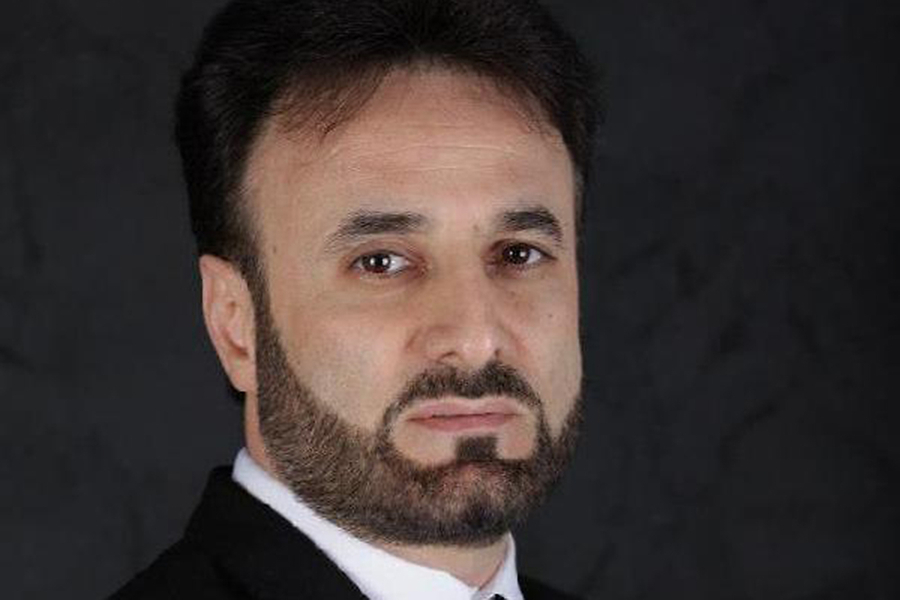
- Kuvvatov in 2013
- Born: Umarali Izatovich Kuvvatov; 21 November 1968; Dushanbe, Tajik Soviet Socialist Republic, USSR
- Died: 5 March 2015 (aged 46); Istanbul, Turkey
- Cause of death: Gunshot wound
- Other names: Umarali Kuvatov or Quvvatov
- Education: Tajik National University
- Occupation: Entrepreneur
- Movement: Group 24
- Spouse: Kumriniso Hafizova
- Parent(s): Izzatullo Kuvvatov (Иззатулло Қувватов), father
- Relatives: Oishamoh Abdulloyeva (Оишамоҳ Абдуллоева), aunt

External images
- Umarali Kuvvatov
- Umarali Kuvvatov (an image from Facebook)
- Kuvatov's wife and children // Махасти Дустмурод. Супруга Умарали Кувватова: «Вся наша семья под угрозой» Asia-Plus 26 December 2014 14:20

Umarali Izatovich Kuvvatov (Tajik: Умаралӣ Қувватов; 21 November 1968 – 5 March 2015) was a Tajikistani businessman and politician. He was the leader of the opposition Group 24, which he had founded after going into exile in 2012. Although the Tajikistani authorities sought his extradition numerous times he was never extradited. He was shot and killed on 5 March 2015 in Istanbul, Turkey.

== Early life ==
Umarali Izatovich Kuvvatov was born on 21 November 1968 in the city of Dushanbe. His father was a veteran of the Eastern Front in World War II. When he was five years old his father died. His mother died shortly afterwards. Kuvvatov grew up in an orphanage together with his four sisters and a brother. After finishing high school he attended the faculty of economics of Tajik National University, where he developed an interest in business.

== Business career ==
As a businessman Kuvvatov was involved in market research and strategic management. He was responsible for building an oil pipeline from Tajiistan to Afghanistan. At one point he worked for a business in oil trading of a close relative of Tajikistani president Emomalii Rahmon. They later fell out over business differences.

== Political positions ==
Kuvvatov was a critic of president Rahmon, accusing him of nepotism and corruption. He was a leader of the opposition Group 24, which he founded after going into exile in 2012. In October 2014 he called on social media on Tajikistanis to gather for a political protest on 10 October at Dousti Square in Dushanbe. However, no one showed up to the protests after Tajikistani authorities had blocked hundreds of websites and deployed armored vehicles. The Supreme Court of Tajikistan subsequently ruled that Kuvvatov's Group 24 was an extremist movement and banned publications by it. The Social Democratic Party and Islamic Renaissance Party of Tajikistan, both opposition parties, distanced themselves from Kuvvatov.

Eurasianet reported that Kuvvatov was not widely known or liked before the failed protests, but that he became much more known afterwards. Between October 2014 and March 2015 the Tajikistani authorities reported to have arrested and sentenced several associates of Kuvvatov or of Group 24. In early March 2015 a court in Dushanbe sentenced Umedjon Solehov to 17.5 years in jail for being a member of the opposition movement, although he denied being member.

== Exile ==
In 2012 Kuvvatov went into exile to first Russia and later the United Arab Emirates after Tajikistan asked for his extradition. He was arrested in Dubai in September 2012 at the behest of Tajikistan. He was released in September 2013 after obtaining a pardon.

Kuvvatov went to Turkey, where he was arrested on 20 December 2014 on an alleged visa violation. His extradition was once more sought by Tajikistan in January 2015, for extremism, economic crimes and hostage-taking. Turkey however refused extradition.

== Death ==
According to Turkish media reports, conspirators planned his murder for three months. At first they wanted to poison Kuvvatov at a joint dinner on the night of 5 March 2015 in Istanbul. After Kuvvatov and his family wanted to leave to go the nearest hospital, he was shot dead with a single bullet to his head around 22:30 in the Fatih district of Istanbul. The Turkish authorities subsequently arrested three persons of Tajik nationality.

Rahmatullo Zoyirov, chairman of the Social Democratic Party of Tajikistan, told RFE/RL's Tajik Service that Kuvvatov's killing had been pre-planned. Kuvvatov's wife, Kumriniso Hafizova, told RFE/RL on 8 March that she, her husband and their two sons had been invited for dinner at the house of Sulaimon Qayumov, a 30-year-old Tajik citizen. Qayumov had been living in Turkey for three months and positioned himself as a Kuvvatov sympathizer. After dinner, Kuvvatov and his family members felt sick and rushed out for fresh air. When they were outside, an unidentified Tajik-speaking man approached Kuvvatov from behind, fired a single shot to his head and immediately fled the scene. Kuvvatov was already dead when medics arrived at the scene and police searched the area for evidence. Turkish media also reported that Kuvvatov's wife and children had symptoms of poisoning.

Some observers have drawn parallels between the murder of Kuvvatov and the late February 2015 assassination of Russian opposition leader Boris Nemtsov. Speaking to journalists on 6 March, Muhiddin Kabiri, the leader of the opposition Islamic Renaissance Party of Tajikistan, compared the killing to the recent deaths of Nemtsov and Rakhat Aliyev, the former son-in-law of Kazakh President Nursultan Nazarbayev. Rajabi Mirzo, an independent political analyst, described Kuvvatov's death as a "shameful and terrible event" that could be compared with Nemtsov's killing. "Nemtsov was killed the day before the announced rally, and Quvatov after the announcement of the [parliamentary] election results" he wrote.

On 26 February 2016 the Istanbul Criminal Court sentenced Sulaimon Kayumov to life imprisonment for the murder of Kuvvatov. Four other Tajikistani suspects soon left the country after the murder. The prosecutor sought between 1.5 and 4.5 years jailtime in absentia against them.

== Personal life ==
Kuvvatov was married and had children including at least two sons.

== See also ==
- Maksud Ibragimov - Tajik opposition politician towards whom an assassination attempt was made in 2014
- Zayd Saidov - Tajik businessman imprisoned for 26 year in 2013 after an attempt to launch a new political party
