= Joseph Goldwasser =

Polish-born American businessman (c.1919 – c.1971)

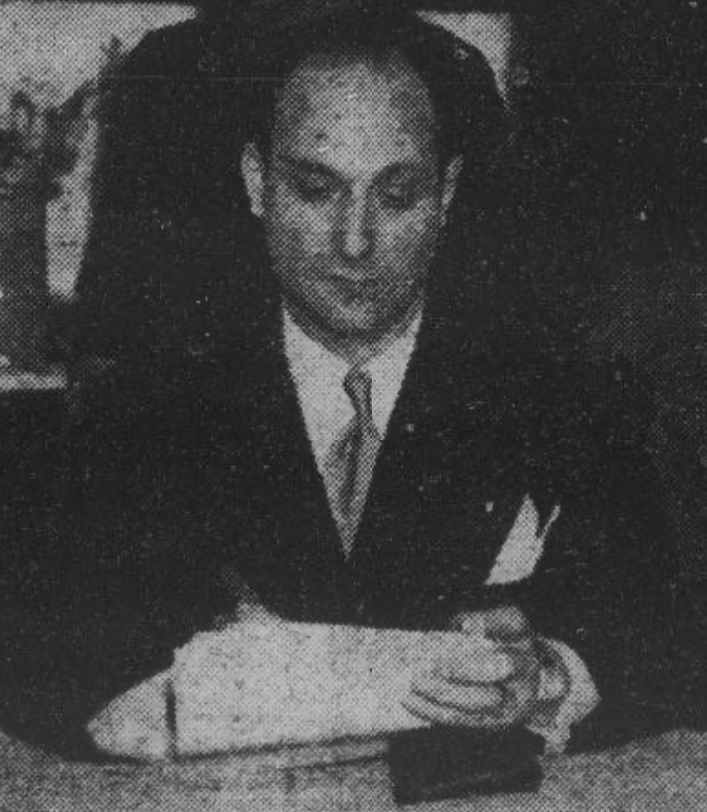
- Goldwasser in a 1949 publication
- Born: c. 1919; Łódź, Poland
- Died: c. 1971 (aged 52)
- Citizenship: Poland; United States
- Occupation: Businessman
- Known for: Investigation of the lynching of Robert Mallard
- Spouse: Draza

Joseph M. Goldwasser (c. 1919 – c. 1971) was a Americanized Polish Jewish businessman. He is known for leading an unofficial investigation in the lynching of Robert Mallard.

== Biography ==
Goldwasser was born c. 1919, in Łódź, and grew up with a family of 10 children. In 1938, when he was 19, he fled to Russia by himself after hearing a warning of the occupation of Poland. He spent World War II in Russia, including a year inside a Gulag. After the war, he fled to Uzbekistan.

Goldwasser later moved to Cleveland, Ohio, and married Draza Goldwasser. He ran a tire business called "Trey Packing", based out of what was once a synagogue. The building later burnt down, and he remodeled it into a department store named the Peerless Department Store. He often employed African Americans who moved from the Southern United States. He was a member of the NAACP's Cleveland branch, and launched an unofficial investigation on the lynching of Robert Mallard. His incestigation led to five men being apprehended, all lf whom were acquitted.

Goldwasser died c. 1971, aged 52, from a heart attack.
