= Youth for the Revival of Tajikistan =

Tajik socio-political youth movement

- Созмони Ҷавонон барои Эҳёи Тоҷикистон
- Established: 2014
- Website: en.tyrt.org

Tajik Youth for the Revival of Tajikistan (Tajik: Созмони Ҷавонон барои Эҳёи Тоҷикистон) is a Tajik opposition socio-political youth movement founded on 14 July 2014 in Moscow, Russia, by a group of Tajik migrants.

== History ==
The movement was established with the participation of Tajik opposition figure Umarali Quvvatov, leader of the political movement Group 24, along with Maksud Ibragimov and Karomat Sharipov. The founding meeting took place in the office of Sharipov, head of the organization Tajik Labour Migrants.

At the founding meeting, Maksud Ibragimov was unanimously elected as chairman. Ubaydullo Saidi (Nosirov) and Nasimjon Sharipov were appointed as his deputies.

The movement initially operated in cooperation with Group 24 and organized meetings with Tajik migrants in several Russian cities, including Moscow, Saint Petersburg, Yekaterinburg, Novosibirsk, Samara, and Kemerovo.

=== Independence (2025) ===
On 24 January 2025, the movement announced its independence from the political movement “Group 24”. According to its statement, the decision was made to improve internal organization, resolve structural challenges, and enhance effectiveness.

Following this change, the organization stated that it would continue its activities independently, focusing on legal, political, and social initiatives, particularly in support of migrants.

== Activities ==
The movement focuses on advocacy for the rights of Tajik migrant workers and addressing social and political issues affecting Tajik youth.

It has organized meetings, discussions, and public events among Tajik migrant communities in Russia. Participants and supporters have raised concerns about social inequality, lack of opportunities for youth in Tajikistan, and the conditions faced by migrants abroad.

== Persecution and legal issues ==
In October 2014, Maksud Ibragimov was placed on an international wanted list by Tajik authorities on charges of extremism. In November 2014, he was reportedly stabbed in Moscow.

In January 2015, Ibragimov disappeared in Moscow and later reappeared in Tajikistan. According to his relatives, he was forcibly transferred. In 2015, he was sentenced in Tajikistan to a prison term reported to range between 13 and 17 years.

Other activists and supporters of the movement were also detained in Russia, some of whom were later released.

== Leadership ==
=== Founding leadership (2014) ===
- Maksud Ibragimov — Chairman
- Ubaydullo Saidi (Nosirov) — First Deputy
- Nasimjon Sharipov — Deputy

=== Current leadership (since 24 January 2025) ===
Following its declaration of independence from “Group 24”, the movement introduced new leadership:

- Ubaydullo Saidi (Nosirov) — Head of the organization
- Barakatulloi Rahmatullo — Deputy Head
- Abdulhay Khalifa — Head of the Information Department
- Ilhom Khalilov — Head of the Legal Department
