= Francisco Cacharro =

Spanish politician

Francisco Cacharro Pardo

President of the Provincial Deputation of Lugo
- In office 1983–2007

Personal details
- Born: 16 November 1936 Jaén, Spain
- Died: 8 March 2015 (aged 78) Lugo, Spain
- Party: People's Party of Galicia

Francisco Cacharro Pardo (16 November 1936 – 8 March 2015) was a Spanish politician who was President of the Provincial Deputation of Lugo between 1983 and 2007.

== Biography ==
Cacharro was born in November 1936 in Jaén, but moved at a young age to Lugo.

Senator by the People's Party of Galicia (PPG). Before entering into politics he was chief inspector of primary education in the province of Lugo between 1973 and 1981. Omnipresent in the Galician politics from the most conservative positions, was Senator Lugo since 1977, was alderman of Lugo from 1979 to 2007 (Councillor for Education between 1982 and 1983) and was president of the Lugo County Council from 1983 to 2007.

For the municipal elections of 2007 José Manuel Barreiro, PPG vice president, announced that he would run in the primaries of the party to be the candidate for president of the county council which was interpreted as a disavowal by the current leadership of the PP to Pileup Pardo and their demonstrations in January 2006 in which supported the statements of Senator popular Carlos Benet in equating at that time was Spanish Prime Minister José Luis Rodríguez Zapatero a coup.

He died on 8 March 2015, aged 78, in a Lugo hospital after suffering from poor health.

== Controversies ==
The alliance between Besteiro and BNG was precisely that ended in 2007 with the almost legendary power Pileup, who had become strong in the presidency of the Council since 1983 after a spell as Regional Minister of Education of the Xunta. Lost power, Pileup also felt abandoned by his party, whose address harshly criticized on several occasions in recent years. The Galician PP had not issued late Sunday afternoon no official statement on the death of their former leader. Condolences and signs of recognition were in charge of the popular Lugo and its president, also PP spokesman in the Senate, José Manuel Barreiro, who started in politics as a contributor to Pileup, but eventually also very distanced from him.
