= Thomas A. O'Halloran =

American particle physicist (1931–2015)

Thomas A. O'Halloran Jr. (13 April 1931 – 28 March 2015) was an American particle physicist.

Both of O'Halloran's parents were natives of County Cork. They moved from Ireland to Brooklyn, New York, where he was born on 13 April 1931. After obtaining a Bachelor of Arts degree in physics at Oregon State University, O'Halloran served in the United States Navy for four years, on the USS Ruddy, and stateside in Las Vegas, before earning a doctorate in physics at University of California, Berkeley. He completed his doctoral studies in 1963, advised by Gerson and Sulamith Goldhaber, then pursued postdoctoral research at Harvard University between 1964 and 1965.

O'Halloran joined the University of Illinois Urbana-Champaign Department of Physics in 1966, as an assistant professor. He was promoted to associate professor in 1968, then full professor in 1970. In 1989, O'Halloran was invited by a former student, Pierre Sokolsky, to serve as a visiting scholar at the University of Utah. Upon retiring from the University of Illinois in 1993, O'Halloran remained affiliated with the University of Utah as a research scientist.

While O'Halloran was affiliated with the University of Utah, he and his wife Barbara split their time between Salt Lake City, Utah, and Tucson, Arizona. They later moved permanently to Tucson. O'Halloran died on 28 March 2015 in Green Valley, Arizona.

O'Halloran's honors and awards included fellowship of the American Physical Society (1969), and a Guggenheim Fellowship (1979).
