= Raymond Toscanelli =

French footballer (1921–2015)

Personal information
- Date of birth: 22 September 1921
- Place of birth: Reims, France
- Date of death: 1 March 2015 (aged 93)
- Position: Attacking midfielder

Senior career*
Years	Team	Apps	(Gls)
1944–1945	Cholet		
1945–1949	Angers	106	(22)
1949–1951	Montpellier	37	(8)
1954–1958	Cholet		
Total		143	(30)

Managerial career
- 1954–1958: Cholet
- * Club domestic league appearances and goals

Raymond Toscanelli (22 September 1921 – 1 March 2015) was a French football player and coach.

== Career ==
Born in Reims, Toscanelli played as an attacking midfielder for Cholet, Angers and Montpellier, and managed Cholet.
