= Ray Hefferlin =

- Born: Ray Alden Hefferlin; 1929; Paris, France
- Died: March 7, 2015; Collegedale, Tennessee, USA
- Education: BS, Pacific Union College; PhD, California Institute of Technology
- Occupation: Research professor in physics

Ray Hefferlin (1929 – March 7, 2015) was a physicist and research professor. He taught at Southern Adventist University and conducted extensive research on periodic systems of small molecules.

== Biography ==
Hefferlin was born in France, in Paris, and moved with his father to the United States when he was seven. His research was in the area of periodic systems of small molecules. He taught at Southern Adventist University in Collegedale, Tennessee, from 1955 until his death. He received the Pegram Award from the Southeastern Section of the American Physical Society and the Professor of the Year Gold Medal Award of the Council for the Advancement and Support of Education.

In 1979, Hefferlin published a periodic ordering of all of the diatomic molecules that could result from combinations of the first 118 elements of the periodic table; unlike earlier such systems, such as that of C. H. Douglas Clark, it was multi-dimensional. According to Scientific American, it allowed accurate prediction of the characteristics of diatomic molecules.

Hefferlin died on March 7, 2015, in Collegedale.
