= William L. Lanier =

American politician and lawyer (1927–2015)

Member of the Georgia House of Representatives
- In office 1951 – April 17, 1961

Personal details
- Born: March 17, 1927 Candler County, Georgia, U.S.
- Died: March 17, 2015 (aged 88) Quitman, Georgia, U.S.
- Party: Democratic
- Spouse: Jean
- Education: Abraham Baldwin Agricultural College; University of Georgia
- Occupation: Politician, lawyer

William L. Lanier (March 17, 1927 – March 17, 2015), also known as Bill Lanier, was an American politician and lawyer. He served as a Democratic member of the Georgia House of Representatives.

== Life and career ==
Lanier was born in Candler County, Georgia. He attended Abraham Baldwin Agricultural College and the University of Georgia.

In 1949, Lanier served as a lawyer in the murder trial for Robert Mallard. He presented a testimony of Mallard's wife Amy as his only piece of evidence. He ended up losing the case.

Lanier served in the Georgia House of Representatives from 1951 to 1961.

Lanier died on March 17, 2015, in Quitman, Georgia, at the age of 88.
