= Providencia Paredes =

Personal assistant to Jacqueline Kennedy Onassis

- Born: June 9, 1924; San Pedro de Macoris, Dominican Republic
- Died: March 18, 2015 (aged 90)

Providencia F. Paredes (June 9, 1924 – March 18, 2015) was the personal assistant to the First Lady of the United States Jacqueline Kennedy Onassis.

== Biography ==
A native of San Pedro de Macoris, Dominican Republic, Parades arrived in the United States in 1948 with Francisco Thomen, Ambassador to the United States from the Dominican Republic. At the conclusion of the Ambassador’s term in Washington, D.C., she returned to the Dominican Republic and was reunited with her first child, Hector, who was born in 1945. Several years later, Provi (as she is known to friends) returned to the United States, where she remarried Gustavo G. Paredes, a former member of the Colombian navy and merchant marines. and gave birth to her second child, Gustavo, in 1954.

In 1957, Senator John F. Kennedy’s personal secretary, Evelyn Lincoln, introduced Paredes to Senator Kennedy. After meeting Mrs. Jacqueline Bouvier Kennedy, Provi began working for the Kennedys in their Georgetown home. Upon Senator John F. Kennedy’s election as President, Paredes became a U.S. citizen and accompanied the Kennedys to the White House and was employed as Mrs. Kennedy’s private attendant. Her role was noteworthy in that she was the only staff member of Hispanic descent in the Kennedy administration's inner circle. Chief among her duties was the care and oversight of the First Lady’s extensive wardrobe and personal accessories.

During the Kennedy White House years, Paredes traveled widely with both the President and Mrs. Kennedy. She accompanied President Kennedy on trips and official state visits to Puerto Rico, Venezuela, Colombia, France, Mexico, and England, and was a companion to the First Lady on trips to Mexico, India, Pakistan, Italy, Greece, Cambodia, Thailand, Turkey and Switzerland. While many trips were official business, others were personal.

After President Kennedy’s assassination, Paredes worked for Robert F. Kennedy until his untimely death, and for Senator Edward M. Kennedy briefly. In 1969 she assumed a position in the United States Postal Service Library Division from which she retired in 1992 after thirty one years of public service. After her death in May 1994, Mrs. Onassis remembered Ms. Paredes in her final will, leaving her a total of US$50,000 in gratitude for her assistance and friendship. Ms. Paredes and her son, Gustavo, who was a good friend of Ms. Onassis's son, John F. Kennedy Jr. attended her burial at Arlington National Cemetery on May 24, 1994.

Paredes and her family maintained a close relationship with many members of the Kennedy family.

Paredes died on March 18, 2015, at the age of 90.
