= Anne Bannister =

British child psychotherapist

Anne Bannister (11 May 1936 – 26 March 2015) was a British child psychotherapist, a pioneer in using stories, toys and puppets to work with victims of child abuse.
