= Basil Soda =

Lebanese fashion designer

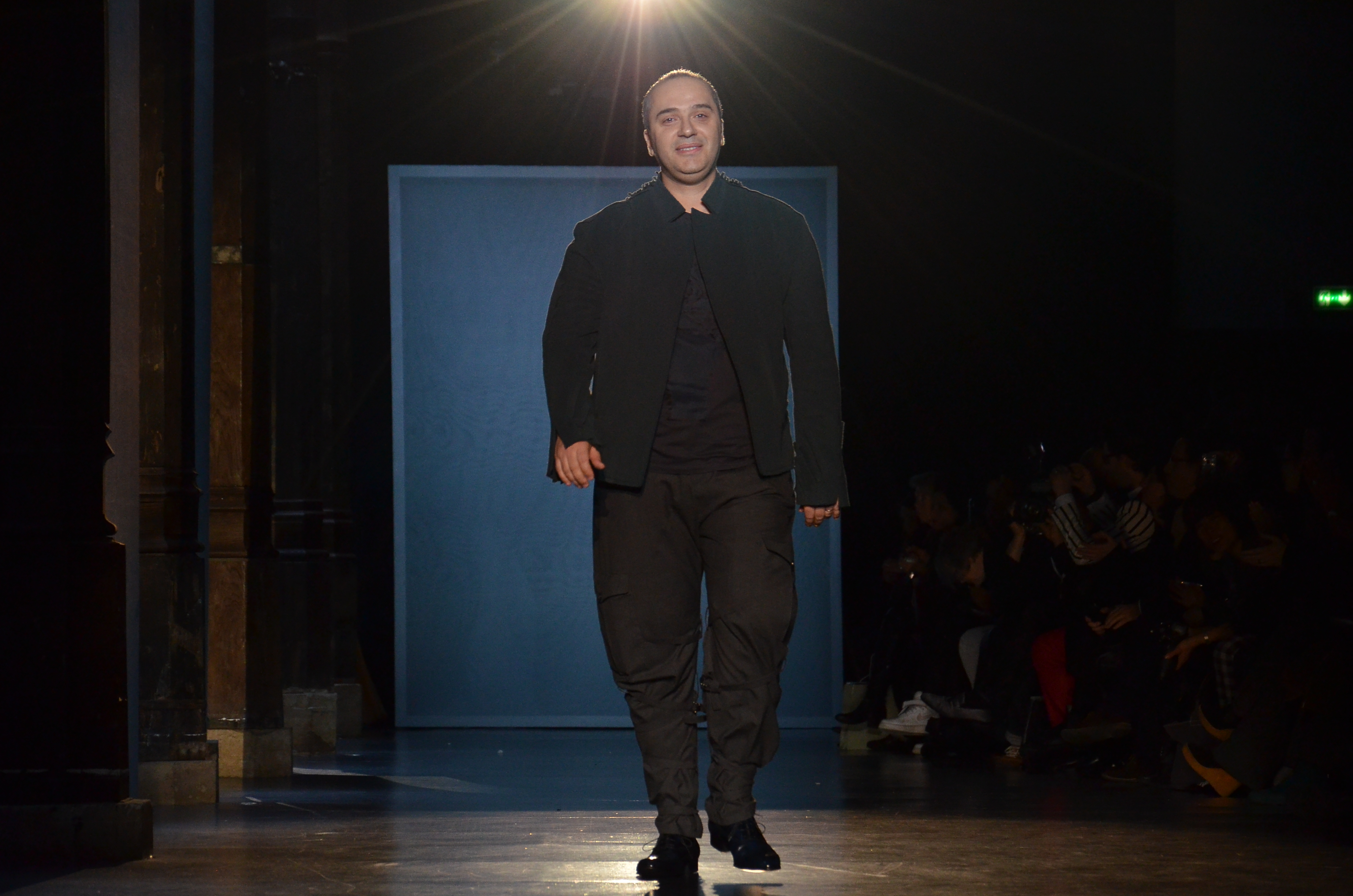
Basil Soda in 2012 in Paris

Basil Soda (born in 1967, Beirut – March 30, 2015) was a Lebanese fashion designer based in Beirut. He studied architecture at the University of the Holy Spirit of Kaslik (USEK) in Lebanon. Before establishing his own label, he worked for the couturier Elie Saab. His designs have been worn by among others Paris Hilton, Giuliana Rancic, Katy Perry, Emily Blunt, Marion Cotillard, Jiang Yiyan and Morena Baccarin. Soda died of cancer on March 30, 2015, at the age of 47.
