= Jim Robison (footballer) =

Australian rules footballer

Personal information
- Full name: James Macfarlane Robison
- Born: 22 December 1927; Kooyong, Victoria
- Died: 29 March 2015 (aged 87); Albury, New South Wales
- Original team: Old Scotch
- Height: 180 cm (5 ft 11 in)
- Weight: 83 kg (183 lb)
- Position: Defence

Playing career^{1}
Years	Club	Games (Goals)
1947–53	Hawthorn	89 (17)
1954	Box Hill (VFA)	14 (5)
- ^{1} Playing statistics correct to the end of 1954.

James Macfarlane Robison (22 December 1927 - 29 March 2015) was an Australian rules footballer who played with Hawthorn in the Victorian Football League (VFL).
