= Madoka Takagi =

Japanese-American photographer

- Born: 1956; Obihiro, Japan
- Died: March 5, 2015 (aged 58–59)

Madoka Takagi (1956–2015) was a Japanese-American photographer known for her palladium prints of American city scenes.

Her work is included in the collections of the Smithsonian American Art Museum, Getty Museum, Museum of Fine Arts, Houston, Los Angeles County Museum of Art, High Museum of Art, Atlanta, International Center of Photography, New York, Museum of Modern Art, New York, and the National Gallery of Art in Washington, DC. In 2002 she was a fellows of the John Simon Guggenheim Memorial Foundation.
