= Roy Ralph =

English cricketer

Personal information
- Full name: Louis Henry Roy Ralph
- Born: 22 May 1920; East Ham, Essex, England
- Died: 31 March 2015 (aged 94); Colchester, Essex, England
- Batting: Right-handed
- Bowling: Right-arm medium pace
- Role: Bowler

Domestic team information
- Years: Team
- 1953–1961: Essex

Career statistics
Competition	FC
Matches	174
Runs scored	3,763
Batting average	16.87
100s/50s	–/9
Top score	73
Balls bowled	24,427
Wickets	460
Bowling average	24.02
5 wickets in innings	19
10 wickets in match	3
Best bowling	7/42
Catches/stumpings	143/–
- Source: CricketArchive, 6 November 2024

Louis Henry Roy Ralph (22 May 1920 – 31 March 2015) was an English cricketer who played for Essex between 1953 and 1961. Ralph died on 31 March 2015.
