= Gurn =

Facial expression

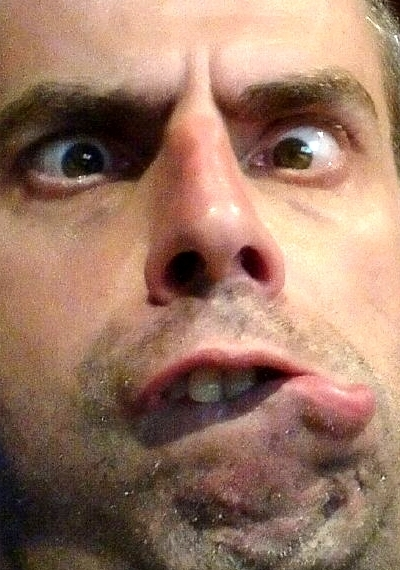
A typical gurn

A gurn or chuck is a distorted facial expression; the term is also used as a verb to describe the action of making such a face. A typical gurn involves projecting the lower jaw as far forward and upward as possible, covering the upper lip with the lower lip.

The English Dialect Dictionary, compiled by Joseph Wright, defines the word gurn as "to snarl as a dog; to look savage; to distort the countenance," while the Oxford English Dictionary suggests that the derivation may originally be Scottish and related to the word grin. In Northern Ireland, the verb to gurn means "to cry," with the act of crying often referred to as "gurnin'". Originally, the Scottish dialectal usage referred to a person who is complaining. Additionally, the term gurn can describe involuntary facial contortions experienced as a side effect of MDMA consumption.

== Gurning contests ==
Gurning contests are a rural English tradition held regularly in certain villages. Contestants traditionally frame their faces through a horse collar—a practice known as "gurnin' through a braffin".

The World Gurning Championship takes place annually at the Egremont Crab Fair. The fair dates to 1267, when King Henry III granted it a royal charter. The precise origins of the gurning competition are unclear; while it may not date back to the 13th century, the local newspaper The Cumberland Paquet described it as an ancient tradition in 1852.

The most successful gurners are often those with no teeth, as this provides greater room to move the jaw further upward. In some cases, elderly or otherwise toothless competitors can perform gurns in which their lower lip completely covers their nostrils. A notable non-competitive example was performed by Jovante Carter, an American from New Orleans, who held such a gurn for 1 minute and 2 seconds to earn a Guinness World Record.

Peter Jackman became one of England's best-known gurners, winning the world championship four times; his victories began in 1998 with a face he called the "Bela Lugosi". He made numerous television appearances, including on the panel show They Think It's All Over. Jackman famously had his teeth removed in 2000 to make his facial features easier to manoeuvre.

Tommy Mattinson holds the record for the most men's world titles, having won the World Gurning Championship 19 times. He took the top prize in 1986 and 1987, and then secured 17 further victories, most recently in 2024.

Anne Woods holds the corresponding record for women, having won the women's world title 28 times.
