= Reima Nummila =

Finnish footballer (1942–2015)

Personal information
- Date of birth: 16 November 1942
- Date of death: 7 March 2015 (aged 72)

International career
Years	Team	Apps	(Gls)
1964–1968	Finland	19	(0)

Reima Nummila (16 November 1942 – 7 March 2015) was a Finnish footballer. He played in 19 matches for the Finland national football team from 1964 to 1968.
