= T. W. Edwards Jr. =

American politician

Member of the South Carolina House of Representatives from the 33rd district
- In office 1967–1988

Personal details
- Born: Thomas Walter Edwards, Jr. November 11, 1929 Knoxville, Tennessee
- Died: March 31, 2015 (aged 85) Spartanburg, South Carolina
- Party: Democratic
- Occupation: Farmer, businessman

Thomas Walter Edwards Jr. (November 11, 1929 – March 31, 2015) was an American politician in the state of South Carolina. He served in the South Carolina House of Representatives as a member of the Democratic Party from 1967 to 1988, representing Spartanburg County, South Carolina. He attended the University of Denver, and was a businessman, owning a real estate/investment firm, as well as a farmer. He died in 2015.
