= John D. States =

American physician (1925–2015)

- Born: John Dunham States; June 16, 1925; Rochester, New York, U.S.
- Died: March 26, 2015 (aged 89); Rochester, New York, U.S.
- Education: University of Rochester (1946); Harvard Medical School (M.D.)
- Occupation: Orthopedic surgeon
- Known for: Work on automobile safety
- Spouse: Sally Johnson States (married 1952)
- Children: 4

John Dunham States (16 June 1925 – 26 March 2015) was an American orthopedic surgeon who dedicated his career to improving automotive safety. He was a graduate of the University of Rochester and received his M.D. from Harvard Medical School. He was a Fellow of the American College of Surgeons, served as a member of the National Motor Vehicle Safety Advisory Council, and chaired the New York State Department of Motor Vehicles Medical Advisory Board. He was a visiting scientist at the Centers for Disease Control. He was the author of 83 scientific publications. States held a patent for an improved seat belt latch.

== Early life ==
Born in Rochester, New York, States was a precocious engineer in his youth. He had built toy cars at the age of six. By the time he reached high school he had driven a vehicle he had made. States had wanted to be an engineer, but his father convinced him to become a physician instead.

== Career ==
=== Medical ===
At age 27 in 1952, he served in the U.S. Air Force Medical Corps as a captain in Texas. Later, he established his practice of orthopedic surgery in Rochester. He was a professor of Orthopedic Surgery at the University of Rochester from 1976 to 1990. He was also a visiting scientist at the Centers for Disease Control.

=== Automobile safety ===
His interest in automotive safety began when he served as race physician for the Watkins Glen International Speedway. As race physician, he learned the risks to the driver of being thrown from the automobile and the protection afforded by the use of seat belts.

In 1966, he developed the first set of automobile safety standards.

In 1970, he developed an improved shoulder harness to restrain the upper body and prevent injuries that occur when the automobile occupant is thrown into the dashboard or windshield during a crash.

States drafted the New York State seat belt law in 1983, the first such law in the U.S. Since then similar laws have been adopted in 49 states. The National Highway Traffic Safety Administration credits these laws with dramatically increasing seat belt use and decreasing injuries and fatalities from traffic crashes.

== Recognition ==
States received the Distinguished Career Award from the Injury Control and Emergency Health Services Section of the American Public Health Association in 2000. He was awarded the Excalibur Award from the National Motor Vehicle Safety Advisory Council. His work on public safety was cited by New York Governor Mario Cuomo. He was dubbed "Dr. Seatbelt" for his advocacy of the safety feature. During TWIV 1172 of This Week in Virology on December 7, 2024, with his son, David, speculation arose — whether in contemporary USA society — advocacy such as that States used to implement the passage of legislation for automobile safety, might be successful with legislators.

== Personal ==
States married Sally Johnson in 1952. They had two daughters and two sons.

States died in Rochester in 2015, aged 89.
