= Stuart Croft (artist) =

British artist and filmmaker

Stuart Croft (1970 – 14 March 2015) was a British artist and filmmaker.

Croft studied at Newcastle Polytechnic, the National College of Art and Design in Dublin, and Chelsea College of Art in London, graduating with an MA in 1998. His work was shown widely in the UK, Europe and the U.S.

Croft's work was usually shown in art galleries and contemporary art institutions, as installations or installed single-screen projections. The work uses the illusion in film narrative to investigate the fleetingness and impossibility to grasp time. Key works of the last decade include Drive In, Century City, The Stag Without a Heart and Comma 39. His work has been shown in galleries, contemporary art museums and cinemas in over 25 countries to date.

Croft's work has been reviewed by Time Out London, The Guardian, Artforum, i-D, Art Monthly, M, London. He started working as a tutor at the Royal College of Art in 2004, established the RCA's Moving Image Studio in 2009, and in 2013, the RCA Moving Image Pathway. He was to work at the RCA until his death from heart failure in March 2015.

The Stuart Croft Foundation (registered charity no 1163676) was established in September 2015 to build on Croft's legacy and increase public understanding and knowledge of contemporary moving image practice.

== Filmography ==
- Remetior (2014)
- Questions (2013)
- Comma 39 (2011)
- Palace (2011)
- The Stag Without a Heart (2010)
- The Death Waltz (2008)
- Drive In (2007)
- Century City (2006)
- Several Small Fires (2005)
- Df Dmb Blnd (2004)
- Hit (2003)
- Rococo 55 (2002)
- The Loss Leader (2000/2005)
- Loveless (2000)
- The Everlasting (1999)
- Dead Happy (1998)
- Point X (1998)
