= Anne Woods (gurner) =

British gurner (1947–2015)

- Born: 5 December 1947; Egremont, Cumberland, England
- Died: 29 March 2015 (aged 67)
- Known for: Most Gurning World Championship wins by a woman
- Spouse: Alex Woods
- Honours: Guinness World Records

Anne Woods (5 December 1947 – 29 March 2015) was a British gurner who won the women's world championship 28 times. Her world record was ratified by the Guinness Book of Records in November 2010, after a protracted effort to have it recognised. Known as "the world's ugliest woman", she was proud of that title, according to former Copeland council leader Elaine Woodburn. Woods regularly performed her four-minute gurning routine to her signature track, "You're Gorgeous" by Babybird.

Woods first started gurning in 1977, when her sons entered her into the competition at the Egremont Crab Fair as a joke. Her first victory came as a surprise to both Anne and her husband Alex, who started gurning himself more than 20 years later. Since her debut, she missed only one competition when she was pregnant with her daughter. Woods became a local community favourite, and as her subsequent successes were covered by the media, she was credited with putting Egremont "on the map". In his 2004 book True Brits, journalist J. R. Daeschner described Woods as a "diminutive, grey-headed granny" whose face normally had "a certain sweetness etched with the wrinkles from a lifetime of smoking", but that when she gurned, she transformed herself into "a crater-faced hag".

The book Fantastic Feats and Ridiculous Records suggested that Woods' success "could well be attributed to her being able to remove her dentures, making her wrinkled face as ugly as a squashed prune". Daeschner noted that Alex Woods was also able to remove his dentures, with the added advantage of having a broken nose. In September 2002, Anne Woods suffered a shock defeat, coming in second place to television presenter Michaela Strachan, who gurned cross-eyed. Her rare defeats included a one-off loss to Pauline Hoyle, a local rival who shouted "It's a fix!" each year when Woods won.

In September 2010, Woods collapsed at the Egremont Crab Fair and had to be taken to hospital after claiming her title. She died in 2015 at age 67.
