= Leon Wouters =

Belgian footballer and coach

Personal information
- Date of birth: 18 June 1930
- Date of death: 30 March 2015 (aged 84)
- Position: Defender

Senior career*
Years	Team	Apps	(Gls)
1949–1963	Antwerp		

Managerial career
- 1969–1972: Zwarte Leeuw
- * Club domestic league appearances and goals

Leon Wouters (18 June 1930 – 30 March 2015) was a Belgian football player and coach.

== Career ==
He played as a defender for Antwerp, and he later managed Zwarte Leeuw.
