= Marc Taraskoff =

French artist

Marc Taraskoff (born Marc Fleischer 25 December 1955 in Boulogne-Billancourt, Hauts-de-Seine, died 2 March 2015 in Brussels, Belgium) was a French illustrator since the late 1970s and a stamp designer since 1996.

Taraskoff has drawn many book covers, such as the pocket edition of Tales of the City at 10/18 edition. He drew portraits of personalities for Le Monde paper.

In 1996, Taraskoff began designing postage stamps for Metropolitan France and French overseas departments and territories. In March 2005, he was named art advisor to the Philatelic Commission of Saint-Pierre-et-Miquelon and as such, helped the local administration in creating its stamps and linking the local artists with the Imprimerie des timbres-poste et valeurs fiduciaires (ITVF, public printer of postage and revenue stamps).
