= Ian Isles =

British Army officer (1917–2015)

Ian Isles MC FFA (24 August 1917 – 24 March 2015) was a Scottish officer in the British Army who won the Military Cross for his actions in Tunis during World War II. After the war he became general manager of the Scottish Equitable Life Assurance Society.
