= Jim Fairburn =

Canadian ice hockey player

- Born: September 12, 1927 Regina, Saskatchewan, Canada
- Died: March 28, 2015 (aged 87) Summerland, British Columbia, Canada
- Weight: 150 lb (68 kg; 10 st 10 lb)
- Position: Right wing
- Played for: Penticton Vees; San Francisco Shamrocks; Minneapolis Millers; Portland Eagles; Victoria Cougars; New Westminster Royals
- National team: Canada
- Playing career: 1943–1960
Medal record
Men's ice hockey
Gold medal – first place	1955 West Germany	Ice hockey

James Edgar Fairburn (September 12, 1927 – March 28, 2015) was a Canadian ice hockey player with the Penticton Vees. He won a gold medal at the 1955 World Ice Hockey Championships in West Germany. He also played professionally for the San Francisco Shamrocks, Minneapolis Millers, Portland Eagles, Victoria Cougars, and New Westminster Royals.
