= Messias Pereira Donato =

Brazilian lawyer (1921–2015)

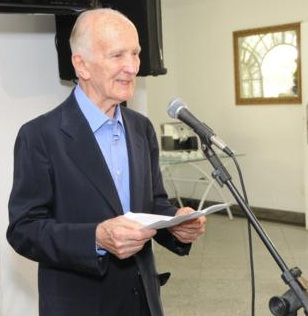
Messias Pereira Donato

Messias Pereira Donato (Guanambi, August 4, 1921 – Belo Horizonte, March 30, 2015) was a Brazilian lawyer, professor, writer, philosopher, magistrate and jurist.

Born in Bahia, graduated in law at the Federal University of Minas Gerais (UFMG), having held the judiciary work in Minas Gerais (MG) over 20 years, teaching for 22 years, as Professor of Labour Law Holder UFMG, having been Director of the Law School. In 1934, at age 13, was taken by his father, the farmer Henrique Pereira Donato, of Guanambi until Malhada- BA on the banks of the São Francisco River. Covered about 110 km mounted "by mule" a journey that took three days. From Malhada followed alone steam to Pirapora - MG and this came from railroad train to the end of twelve days of travel to get to Belo Horizonte, where he continued his studies.

He graduated in law at December 10, 1947, as the first student in his class, being awarded the "Rio Branco Award", for the student who obtained the highest marks. During the course had other distinctions, including a national contest winner monografias and speech contest of Faculdade.

He taught Portuguese at the College Marconi, of Belo Horizonte, from 1949 to 1951 and was then director of that primary school and Federal Inspector of Secondary Education by tender. In 1952, at the Faculty of Law of the University of Paris, concluded a PhD in Social Economy and Labour. In 1958, he graduated in Social Sciences at the Faculty of Philosophy of the University of Minas Gerais, there also obtained the degree of Doctor and assuming the same year, as higher education instructor, conducted by History of Economic Doctrines of that school until 1961 . In November this year, in competition for the Chair of Labour Law at the University of Minas Gerais, was approved in the first place, during which presented the thesis "The role of the workers' union within the private company".

He joined the Labour Judiciary in 1961 as Judge's Study - President of the Conciliation Board and Juiz de Fora Judgment - MG, municipality that in 1963 awarded him the title of Citizen Honorário.

He is considered one of the most important national references in Law Trabalho, including his most recent work "Individual Labour Law Course", 6th. Edition, published by Editora LTr in 2008. Due to the relevance of their academic and legal paper, the Faculty of Law of the UFMG periodically grants to undergraduate students that gets the best grade in proof of the Labor Law and Procedure discipline, the Award "Messias Pereira Donato".

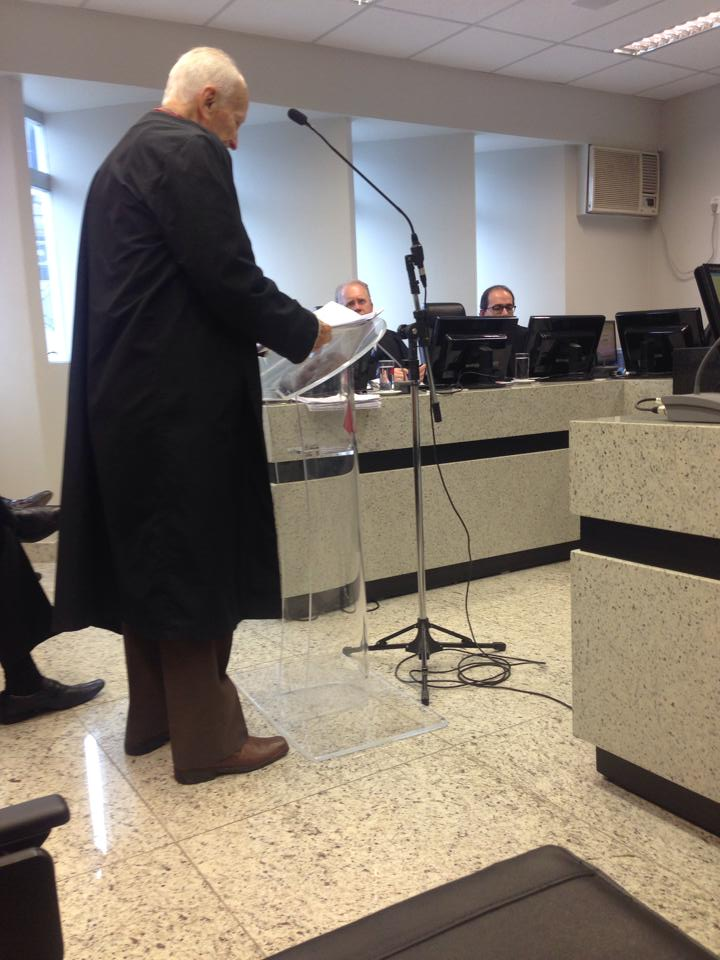

In September 2014, during the National Labour Law Congress - CONAT, held in Belo Horizonte, renowned personalities of the Labor Law were honored with the "Commendation Messias Pereira Donato". On that occasion, Messias was given a standing ovation by the full Congress.

By the end of his life he was active in professional advocacy nacional. Held from the foundation, the chair 20 of the National Law Academy Trabalho18. Integrated the following institutions: Academy Iberoamericana de Derecho del Trabajo (Spain), Inter-American Institute of Derecho del Trabajo (Argentina), Mining of Legal Academia, Social Law Institute Cesariano Junior (São Paulo), Institute of Minas Gerais Lawyers Association of Labor Lawyers of Minas Gerais, Law Institute of Juiz de Fora Work and Brazilian Legal Centre, Belo Horizonte. In 2010, he joined the Social and Labor Rights Commission of OAB/MG. He was a member of the Editorial Board of the Journal Legal Science of Labour, the publisher "Legal Science">. Among his legal works, stand out, as well as articles published in national journals and abroad, "The labor union movement in the capitalist regime", "The role of the union within the private company", "Law Course work "and said" Individual Labour Law Course".

His intellectual production also includes the works of translation of the most important American poet, Walt Whitman, considered the precursor of modern poetry. Launched in 1956, the translation of the book "Symphony of Life" was revised and updated in 2011, published by the RTM publisher.

In December 2014, through the Regional Labor Court - TRT 5th. Region, donated to his homeland, Guanambi, its labor law library with about 3500 títulos. Justified the lawyer at the time it was a way to honor their land, which was the first lawyer. Your donation was further enriched by the family of his deceased brother Gildásio Pereira Donato, who donated his Civil law library.
