= Norman Minnaar =

South African cricketer (1957–2015)

Personal information
- Born: 23 April 1957; East London, Eastern Cape, South Africa
- Died: 15 March 2015 (aged 57); Grahamstown, South Africa
- Source: Cricinfo, 25 March 2016

Norman Minnaar (23 April 1957 – 15 March 2015) was a South African cricketer. He played twenty-two first-class matches for Border between 1982 and 1987.
