= William B. Ewald Jr. =

American speechwriter and historian (1925–2015)

William B. Ewald Jr. (December 8, 1925 – March 16, 2015) was an American speechwriter for Dwight Eisenhower. He worked at the White House until 1961, and then for the chairman of IBM, until 1988. Ewald authored several histories of the Eisenhower presidency, which led to a critical reassessment of those years.

He graduated from Washington University in St. Louis (BA) and Harvard University (PhD).

He died of a respiratory failure at age 89.
