= Lajos Molnár =

Hungarian politician

Lajos Molnár (13 October 1946 – 23 March 2015) was a Hungarian politician who was the Minister for Health from 2006 to 2007.
