= Graham Spooner =

Australian rules footballer

Personal information
- Full name: Arthur Graham Spooner
- Born: 2 March 1933
- Died: 30 March 2015 (aged 82)
- Original team: Preston Presbyterians
- Height: 180 cm (5 ft 11 in)
- Weight: 77 kg (170 lb)

Playing career^{1}
Years	Club	Games (Goals)
1953	Fitzroy	2 (0)
- ^{1} Playing statistics correct to the end of 1953.

Graham Spooner (2 March 1933 – 30 March 2015) was an Australian rules footballer who played with Fitzroy in the Victorian Football League (VFL).
