= Lada Galina =

Bulgarian writer

Lada Galina (Bulgarian: Лада Галина) was the pen name of Ganka Slavova Karanfilova (Bulgarian: Ганка Славова Каранфилова; February 6, 1934 – March 31, 2015), a Bulgarian writer.

She was born in Burgas and was educated there, in Dimitrovgrad and at Sofia University, where she studied Bulgarian literature. She began work with a local newspaper. With the poet Penyo Penev, she founded a literary society. She married Efrem Karanfilov, an essayist and literary critic. In 1987, she took part in the International Writing Program at the University of Iowa.

Her work was first published in the literary journals Literaturen front (for which she was later editor) and Narodna mladezh. She was editor for the magazine Plamŭk (Flame) and for the Publishing House of the Central Council of Bulgarian Trade Unions. She was also chief playwright for the state theater of satire.

She later came to the United States and founded the Bulgarian Education and Culture Center in Washington. She died at a rehabilitation center in Washington from complications following a stroke at the age of 81.

== Selected works ==
- Drugijat brjag na zaliva (The other side of the bay), stories (1963)
- Aerogara (Airport), novel (1965)
- Tsvetut na izvorite (The colors of springs), novel (1966)
