= Desmond Daniel =

South African cricketer (1943–2015)

Personal information
- Born: 19 January 1943; Cape Province, South Africa
- Died: 2 March 2015 (aged 72); Sharjah, United Arab Emirates
- Source: Cricinfo, 25 March 2016

Desmond Daniel (19 January 1943 – 2 March 2015) was a South African cricketer. He played nine first-class matches for Orange Free State between 1966 and 1968.
