= Velayudhan Govindan =

Indian cricketer

Personal information
- Born: Trichur, India
- Died: 8 March 2015; Chennai, India
- Source: Cricinfo, 25 March 2016

Velayudhan Govindan (died 8 March 2015) was an Indian cricketer. He played fifteen first-class matches for Kerala between 1957 and 1967.
