= Ben Kingree =

American politician and lawyer

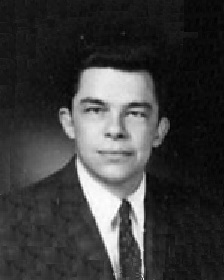
- Official portrait of Kingree, 1967

Member of the Tennessee House of Representatives from the 20th district
- In office January 3, 1967 – January 7, 1969
- Preceded by: Spot Lowe
- Succeeded by: Spot Lowe

Personal details
- Born: September 7, 1934 Shelbyville, Tennessee, U.S.
- Died: March 6, 2015 (aged 80) Hilton Head Island, South Carolina, U.S.
- Party: Democratic
- Spouse: Sarah Jane Hinerman
- Education: Vanderbilt University

Military service
- Allegiance: United States
- Branch/service: United States Marine Corps
- Rank: Captain

Ben Kingree III (September 7, 1934 – March 6, 2015) was an American politician and lawyer.

Born in Shelbyville, Tennessee, Kingree served in the United States Marine Corps. He then received his bachelor's and law degrees from Vanderbilt University. He practiced law in Shelbyville, Tennessee and in Atlanta, GA. Kingree served in the Tennessee House of Representatives from 1967 to 1969 and was a Democrat. In 1972, Kingree moved to Atlanta, Georgia and practiced law. He died in Hilton Head Island, South Carolina where he lived.
