= Kenneth Smales =

English cricketer

Kenneth Smales (15 September 1927 – 10 March 2015) was an English former first-class cricketer, who played thirteen games for Yorkshire County Cricket Club from 1948 to 1950, and 148 matches for Nottinghamshire from 1951 to 1958. He was born in Horsforth, Leeds, Yorkshire, England.

A right arm, off break bowler, he took 389 wickets at 30.70, with a best of all ten for 66 against Gloucestershire at Stroud. He took five wickets in an innings twenty times and 10 wickets in a match on five occasions. He scored 2,512 runs at 14.43, with a best of 64 against Glamorgan, one of four fifties he compiled. He took 60 catches in the field. He had one hat-trick to his name against Lancashire at Trent Bridge.

Smales joined Nottingham Forest F.C. in 1958 as assistant secretary, then became full-time secretary in January 1961. He went on to give over thirty five years of service to the club, and was secretary during Brian Clough's reign, where the club won countless trophies both home and abroad. He has put his signature to many famous transfers, notably that of the first million pound footballer, Trevor Francis.

Privately, he was an accomplished golfer achieving a handicap of four at Wollaton Park Golf Club, as well as playing local amateur cricket for Bulwell C.C. well into his forties. He wrote a book on the history of Nottingham Forest F.C., with in-depth facts about the club's history, and he ran a website.

He had a son (Michael), and two grandchildren (Anna and Joseph). On 10 March 2015, he died at the age of 87.
