= Matthew Young (civil servant) =

British civil servant

Matthew Young (17 November 1944 – 1 March 2015) was a British civil servant. Young worked for the governments of Harold Wilson, James Callaghan and Margaret Thatcher; he later went on to be chief executive of the Panini company.
