= Greyhound adoption =

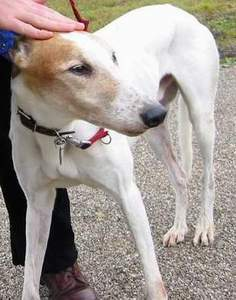
A "retired racer" Greyhound

Greyhound adoption or Greyhound rescue programs focus on finding homes for greyhounds who are no longer needed for racing. Greyhounds have had a reputation for being gentle, people-centered dogs, and "par-excellence for persons wishing for a companion for themselves or their children".

As of 2024, most greyhound adoption programs are based in Australia, Ireland, New Zealand, and the United Kingdom, as each of those countries still has relatively large greyhound racing industries.

== History ==
Early adoptions became in the United Kingdom as early as 1956.

In the United States, greyhound adoption did not begin on a wide scale until 1981, when Seabrook Greyhound Park in New Hampshire distributed a newspaper to track patrons promoting greyhounds as pets.

Greyhound Pets of America (GPA) was established in 1987 for the purpose of finding homes for ex-racing greyhounds and educating the public on the suitability and availability of Greyhounds as pets, and is the largest non-profit greyhound adoption group. GPA has adopted out over 80,000 Greyhounds.

One of the last major greyhound adoption agencies in the United States closed permanently in 2022, given that there are now only two greyhound tracks left in the United States, both in West Virginia. Additional groups in the US that facilitate greyhound adoptions now exclusively get their dogs from Ireland or Australia.

== See also ==
- Dog adoption
- Greyhound racing
- Greyhound
