= Luís Miguel Rocha =

Portuguese author and producer (1976–2015)

- Born: February 1976; Porto
- Died: 26 March 2015 (aged 39); Viana do Castelo
- Occupations: Novelist, producer
- Writing career
- Notable work: The Last Pope

Luís Miguel Rocha (February 1976 in Porto – 26 March 2015 in Mazaferes) was a Portuguese author, television writer and producer. He became a New York Times bestseller in 2009.

== Biography ==
Rocha was born in Porto, and raised in Viana do Castelo. Prior to publishing his first novel, Rocha wrote and produced television in London. Rocha's second novel, The Last Pope, was published in 2006. The novel examines the conspiracy theories about the death of Pope John Paul I.

The Holy Bullet, also known as The Holy Assassin, his third novel, was published in 2007. The Pope's Assassin, also known as The Papal Decree, is the third book of the Vatican series. The last book of the series is A Filha Do Papa, released in 2013.

Rocha died in March 2015 after a prolonged illness.

== Works ==
=== Vatican Series ===
- O Último Papa (2006) The Last Pope
- Bala Santa (2007) The Holy Bullet
- A Mentira Sagrada (2011) The Pope's Assassin
- A Filha do Papa (2013)
- A Resignação (2018) after death.

=== Others ===
- Um País Encantado (2005)
- A Virgem (2009)
- Curiosidades do Vaticano (2016) after death.
