= Delfi Galbiati =

Uruguayan actor

Delfi Galbiati (October 21, 1944 – March 12, 2015) was an actor in the Uruguayan National Theater. He began his career in 1964 in independent theatre and joined the National Theater (called "Comedia Nacional") in 1973, performing more than a hundred titles. He received the Florencio Award (Premio Florencio) five times.

He had a long career.
