= Asia-Plus =

- Parent company: Asia Plus Media Group
- Founded: 1995
- Country of origin: Tajikistan
- Headquarters location: Dushanbe
- Publication types: Tajikistan Economic Review; Asia-Plus Blitz; Asia Plus
- Nonfiction topics: News
- Official website: Official website

Asia-Plus is a privately owned independent news agency based in Dushanbe, Tajikistan.

== History and profile ==
Asia-Plus news agency was established in 1995 and started its activity in English and in Russian in 1996. It is privately owned and the owner is the Asia Plus Media Group. The agency is based in Dushanbe and started a weekly paper, Asia Plus in 2000. It also publishes Tajikistan Economic Review, a monthly, and Asia-Plus Blitz, a newsletter published in weekdays. It has an independent political leaning. It has received funds from the National Endowment for Democracy.

In June 2012, the website of the agency was cut allegedly by the Tajik authorities. A month later the authorities again banned the website in addition to those of Russia’s RIA Novosti news agency and BBC's website in Russian.
