= Aleck Che-Mponda =

Tanzanian politician and academic

Dr. Aleck H. Che-Mponda (August 14, 1935 – March 30, 2015) was a Tanzanian politician and academic.

== Biography ==
Dr. Aleck Che-Mponda was born in Lifua, Manda, Ludewa District in what was then Tanganyika, to Mary Gandula Makatochi and Emmanuel Obadiah Hauli Mponda. He departed this life on Monday, March 30, 2015 at Massana Hospital in Dar es Salaam after losing his fight with cancer.

He studied at Manda Primary School, Chidya Secondary School and Minaki High School. He started showing an interest in politics while in High School. He studied to be Medical Assistant at Princess Margaret Medical Training Centre (now the Muhimbili University of Health and Allied Sciences). He also worked as an Engineer at Tanganyika Broadcasting (now Radio Tanzania). In 1959 he went to study at Howard University in Washington D.C., USA. graduating with a PhD in Political Science in 1972. His dissertation on the Malawi-Tanzania Border Dispute has become a major instrument in resolving the matter. He also was one of the first announcers for the Voice of America’s Swahili Service starting in 1962.

Dr. Che-Mponda taught at the University of Notre Dame in South Bend, Indiana, USA from 1973 to 1976. He later went to teach Political Science at the University of Dar es Salaam. He was one of the Founders of the current Multi-Party system. He is a Founder of the Civic United Front party but left to start the Tanzania Peoples Party. He ran for President of Tanzania on the TPP Ticket. He later returned to the ruling party, CCM. When Dr. Che-Mponda proposed building a bridge to Kigamboni in the early 1990s he was laughed at and ridiculed. That bridge is now almost complete. He also proposed a Rapid Transit system for Dar es Salaam which will soon happen.

Dr. Che-Mponda met the love of his life, Rita at a student conference in 1960. They were married in 1962.

Dr. Che-Mponda is survived by his widow, Rita, their four children Chem-Chemi, Aleck Jr., Jessica, and Malaika. Seven grandchildren, Camara, Elechi, Caleb, Cayla, Caitlin, Stanley II, and Lilian. Two honorary sons, Salum and Emmanuel Kihaule. Sisters Mabel and Esther, numerous nieces nephews and other relatives. His siblings who preceded him in death are Veronica, Margaret, Samweli, Greene, and Prof. Crispin Hauli.
