= Richard Gruenther =

American modern pentathlete

Personal information
- Born: December 14, 1924 Philippines
- Died: March 18, 2015 (aged 90)

Sport
- Sport: Modern pentathlon

Richard Gruenther (December 14, 1924 – March 18, 2015) was an American modern pentathlete. He competed in the 1948 Summer Olympics.
