= Zayd Saidov =

Tajik businessman and politician (born 1958)

Zayd Sherovich Saidov
- Born: 20 March 1958 (age 68)
- Occupation: Businessman
- Known for: Creation of opposition party "New Tajikistan"

Zayd Sherovich Saidov (Зайд Шерович Саидов; born 20 March 1958) is a Tajik businessman and politician. Saidov was engaged in business through the 1990s, but in 1999 went into government service, working as Tajikistan's Industry Minister from 2002-2007. In 2013, he was arrested and sentenced to 26 years in prison for his alleged engagement in financial fraud, polygamy, and sexual relations with a minor. He is currently serving 29 years in prison after additional charges of forgery, embezzlement, abuse of office, and tax evasion were added.

== Background ==
Before his arrest, Saidov maintained close ties with Tajikistan's ruling elite. He was a member of the opposition during the Tajikistani Civil War from 1992-1997, but earned a post in government as a result of a power-sharing agreement. Saidov held a ministerial position as head of the Industry Affairs Committee from 2002 to 2007. Technically, he formed part of the government opposition, but he worked closely with President Rahmon, spending time with him during meetings and trips. When he left his post, he concentrated on commercial pursuits. Saidov ran an extensive business operation focused on real estate, construction, jewelry, and textiles.

== 2013 Arrest and Sentence ==
On 6 April 2013 Saidov announced his intention to create a new political party titled 'New Tajikistan', which centered around economic reforms. A campaign of government-backed denigration and threats followed and on 19 May 2013 he was arrested upon returning from Paris. On 25 December 2013 Zayd Saidov received a sentence of 26 years imprisonment for his alleged engagement in financial fraud, polygamy, and sexual relations with a minor.

All of the companies and properties under the ownership of Saidov were confiscated by the state. An additional three years in prison were later added to his sentence for forgery, embezzlement, abuse of office, and tax evasion. He is currently serving a sentence of 29 years.

Little over a year following Saidov's indictment, on 13 January 2015, his defense lawyer Shukhrat Kudratov, who had been outspoken on blatant procedural violations in the Saidov case, was jailed for 9 years for alleged fraud and bribery.

== International Response ==
In February 2014, Human Rights Watch called on the Tajik government to "end its harassment of the political opposition". Steve Swerdlow, Central Asia researcher at Human Rights Watch stated, "Saidov's conviction starkly illustrates that the Tajik government will neither accept criticism nor the role of opposition parties in a democratic society,". He went on to say that "the criminal investigation against Zaid Saidov has been marred by serious due process violations and an unmistakable attempt by authorities to deprive him of the right to defend himself,".

In July 2018, the UN Human Rights Committee found that Saidov's trial was in violation of international law and called for his release.

Freedom Now, Civil Rights Defenders, Human Rights Watch, and the Norwegian Helsinki Committee joined together to call on the UN Secretary-General and the European Union to investigate Saidov's sentence and imprisonment.

In July 2019, Freedom Now submitted a report detailing the case to the Office of the UN Human Rights Committee. This report was delivered in advance of Tajikistan's Universal Periodic Review conducted by the UN in June 2019. Freedom Now submitted a report to the UN Human Rights Council pertaining to the case in advance of Tajikistan's Universal Periodic Review in March 2021.
