= Lisa Bonchek Adams =

American writer (1969–2015)

Lisa Deborah Adams (née Bonchek; July 29, 1969 – March 6, 2015) was an American writer known as @AdamsLisa, and an advocate for breast cancer research, employing both social media and her personal blog. Her use of these channels sparked controversy in the traditional media fields.

== Early life and education ==
Lisa Deborah Bonchek was born in Nashville, Tennessee on July 29, 1969 to Dr. Lawrence Bonchek and Dr. Rita Bonchek. She studied at Cornell University and later graduated from Franklin & Marshall College. She earned a master's degree in sociology from Rutgers.

== Death ==
She lived in Darien, Connecticut, where she died in 2015 at age 45 after a three year battle with Stage IV breast cancer, eight years after her initial diagnosis. She was survived by her parents, brother, husband, and three children. In January 2014, Emma Gilbey Keller, at the time a reporter for The Guardian, and her husband Bill Keller, an executive editor for the New York Times criticized Adams for the volume of her posts about her cancer battle rather than fighting quietly. Bill Keller left the paper in February, and Emma resigned from The Guardian in April 2014 following significant criticism. The Guardian removed the piece.
