= Group 24 =

Group 24 Гурӯҳи 24
- Leader: Suhrob Zafar
- Founder: Umarali Quvvatov
- Founded: 2012
- Banned: 2015
- Headquarters: Istanbul, Turkey
- Ideology: Liberal democracy Islamic liberalism Secularism; Anti-fascism
- Political position: Radical centrism
- National affiliation: Islamic Renaissance Party of Tajikistan; Congress of Constructive Forces of Tajikistan; Young People for the Revival of Tajikistan
- Slogan: "Faith, Honor, Freedom, Equality!"

Website
- https://guruhi24.net/

Group 24 (Russian: Группа 24, romanized: Gruppa 24; Tajik: Гурӯҳи 24, romanized: Guruhi 24) is a political opposition movement in Tajikistan. It opposes the rule of president Emomali Rahmon, who it accuses of corruption and nepotism.

Group 24 was founded in 2012 by businessman and politician Umarali Quvvatov, who served as its leader until his assassination in 2015.

== History ==
=== Establishment ===
Quvvatov, a businessman who formerly had ties to Rahmon's family, established Group 24 to campaign for democratic reforms in Tajikistan following the Gorno-Badakhshan clashes. The organisation became popular via social media, particularly among the Tajik diaspora.

=== Protests ===
On 10 October 2014, Quvvatov called for peaceful protests to be held in Dushanbe against the government. The probability for mass protests was estimated as low by analysts who pointed to political apathy and the idea that protest is associated with anarchy, as promoted by the state. On 5 October, authorities had suspended the operation of SMS systems and temporarily blocked at least 300 websites including Facebook, YouTube and Russian-language social networks. They increased law enforcement presence in the capital. No protests ultimately materialized.

Members of Group 24 living outside of Tajikistan have subsequently protested state visits of Rahmon to the Czech Republic, Russia, Switzerland, and France.

=== National ban ===
Amidst a government crackdown, Group 24 was banned by Tajikistan's Supreme Court on 9 October for alleged extremism; this made membership or association with the organisation a criminal offence. Former members of the group called for the country's supreme court to remove the party from the list of banned extremist groups, arguing that the group poses no threat, though to date these calls have been unsuccessful.

=== Assassination of Umarali Quvvatov ===
Quvvatov was assassinated on 6 March 2015 in Turkey after being shot in the head by an unknown assailant. His death came two days after a Tajik court sentenced another member of Group 24 to 17 years in prison for attempting to seize power and insulting the president. President Rahmon's opponents accused authorities of orchestrating the assassination, as did international organisations including Human Rights Watch. Following Quvvatov's death, the group elected his cousin, Sharofiddin Gadoev as its new leader.

On 26 February 2016, Sulaimon Kayumov was sentenced to life imprisonment in Turkey for the assassination of Quvvatov.

== Repression of membership ==
Some Tajik activists were sentenced to lengthy prison terms for their alleged association with Group 24. In March 2015 three people received sentences ranging from 16.5 to 17.5 years. In April, 2015, another two people were sent to prison for 3 and 3.5 years for the alleged organising of Group 24 activities.

In July 2023, Belarus extradited Nizomiddin Nasriddinov, a Group 24 activist, to Tajikistan, despite him being granted refugee status in Germany due to concerns he faced persecution and torture in Tajikistan due to his activism. Members of Group 24 have been detained and forcibly repatriated to Tajikistan from countries including Belarus, Russia, and Moldova, among others.
