= 2014 in association football =

The following are the scheduled events of association football for the year 2014 throughout the world.

== Events ==
=== Men's national teams ===
==== AFC ====
- 25 December 2013 – 7 January: 2014 WAFF Championship in Qatar
  - (gold) Qatar
  - (silver) Jordan
  - (bronze) Bahrain
  - 4th Kuwait
- 19 – 30 May: 2014 AFC Challenge Cup in Maldives
  - (gold) Palestine
  - (silver) Philippines
  - (bronze) Maldives
  - 4th Afghanistan
- 22 November – 20 December: 2014 AFF Cup in Singapore and Vietnam
  - (gold) Thailand
  - (silver) Malaysia

==== CAF ====
- 11 January – 1 February: 2014 African Nations Championship in South Africa
  - (gold) Libya
  - (silver) Ghana
  - (bronze) Nigeria
  - 4th Zimbabwe

==== CONCACAF ====
- 3 – 13 September: 2014 Copa Centroamericana in the United States
  - (gold) Costa Rica
  - (silver) Guatemala
  - (bronze) Panama
  - 4th El Salvador
- 10 – 18 November: 2014 Caribbean Cup in Jamaica
  - (gold) Jamaica
  - (silver) Trinidad and Tobago
  - (bronze) Haiti
  - 4th Cuba

==== UEFA ====
- 29 – 31 May: 2014 Baltic Cup in Latvia
  - (gold) Latvia
  - (silver) Lithuania
  - (bronze) Finland
  - 4th Estonia

==== FIFA ====
- 12 June – 13 July: 2014 FIFA World Cup in Brazil for the second time.
  - (gold) Germany
  - (silver) Argentina
  - (bronze) Netherlands
  - 4th Brazil

=== Men's youth ===
==== UEFA ====
- 9 – 21 May: UEFA Under 17 Championship in Malta
  - (gold) England
  - (silver) Netherlands
- 19 – 31 July: UEFA Under 19 Championship in Hungary
  - (gold) Germany
  - (silver) Portugal

==== AFC ====
- 11–26 January: 2013 AFC U-22 Championship in Oman
  - (gold) Iraq
  - (silver) Saudi Arabia
  - (bronze) Jordan
  - 4th South Korea
- 6 – 20 September: 2014 AFC U-16 Championship in Thailand
  - (gold) North Korea
  - (silver) South Korea
- 9 – 23 October: 2014 AFC U-19 Championship in Myanmar
  - (gold) Qatar
  - (silver) North Korea

=== Women's national teams ===
==== AFC ====
- 15 – 19 April: 2014 WAFF Women's Championship in Jordan
  - (gold) Jordan
  - (silver) Palestine
  - (bronze) Bahrain
  - 4th Qatar

=== Women's youth ===
==== FIFA ====
- 15 March – 5 April: 2014 FIFA U-17 Women's World Cup in Costa Rica.
  - (gold) Japan
  - (silver) Spain
  - (bronze) Italy
  - 4th Venezuela
- 5 – 24 August: 2014 FIFA U-20 Women's World Cup in Canada.
  - (gold) Germany
  - (silver) Nigeria
  - (bronze) France
  - 4th North Korea

=== Multi-sports events ===
==== Men's ====
- 14 – 27 August: 2014 Summer Youth Olympics in Nanjing, China.
  - (gold) China
  - (silver) Venezuela
  - (bronze) Mexico
  - 4th Slovakia
- 14 September – 2 October: 2014 Asian Games in Incheon, South Korea.
  - (gold) South Korea
  - (silver) North Korea
  - (bronze) Iraq
  - 4th Thailand
- 19 – 28 November: 2014 Central American and Caribbean Games in Veracruz, Mexico.
  - (gold) Mexico
  - (silver) Venezuela
  - (bronze) Cuba
  - 4th Honduras

==== Women's ====
- 14 – 27 August: 2014 Summer Youth Olympics in Nanjing, China.
  - (gold) Peru
  - (silver) South Korea
  - (bronze) Iceland
  - 4th Cape Verde
- 14 September – 1 October: 2014 Asian Games in Incheon, South Korea.
  - (gold) North Korea
  - (silver) Japan
  - (bronze) South Korea
  - 4th Vietnam
- 17 – 27 November: 2014 Central American and Caribbean Games in Veracruz, Mexico.
  - (gold) Mexico
  - (silver) Colombia
  - (bronze) Costa Rica
  - 4th Venezuela

== Fixed dates for national team matches ==
Scheduled international matches per the FIFA International Match Calendar:

- 17–25 March
- 1–9 September
- 6–14 October
- 10–18 November

== Club continental champions ==
=== Men ===
Region	Tournament	Defending champion	Champion	Title	Last honor
AFC (Asia)	2014 AFC Champions League	(China) Guangzhou Evergrande	(Australia) Western Sydney Wanderers	1st	—
AFC (Asia)	2014 AFC Cup	Kuwait SC	(Kuwait) Qadsia SC	1st	—
AFC (Asia)	2014 AFC President's Cup	(Turkmenistan) Balkan	(Turkmenistan) HTTU Asgabat	1st	—
CAF (Africa)	2014 CAF Champions League	(Egypt) Al Ahly	(Algeria) ES Sétif	2nd	1988
CAF (Africa)	2014 CAF Confederation Cup	(Tunisia) Sfaxien	(Egypt) Al Ahly	1st	—
CAF (Africa)	2014 CAF Super Cup	(Egypt) Al Ahly	(Egypt) Al Ahly	6th	2013 CAF Super Cup
CONCACAF (North and Central America, Caribbean)	2013–14 CONCACAF Champions League	(Mexico) Monterrey	(Mexico) Cruz Azul	6th	1997
CONCACAF (North and Central America, Caribbean)	2014 CFU Club Championship	(Trinidad and Tobago) Caledonia AIA	(Puerto Rico) Bayamón F.C. (Jamaica) Waterhouse F.C. (Guyana) Alpha United FC	3rd 1st 1st	2011 CFU Club Championship (Puerto Rico)
CONMEBOL (South America)	2014 Copa Libertadores	(Brazil) Atlético Mineiro	(Argentina) San Lorenzo	1st	—
CONMEBOL (South America)	2014 Copa Sudamericana	(Argentina) Lanús	(Argentina) River Plate	1st	—
CONMEBOL (South America)	2014 Recopa Sudamericana	(Brazil) Corinthians	(Brazil) Atlético Mineiro	1st	—
OFC (Oceania)	2013–14 OFC Champions League	(New Zealand) Auckland City	(New Zealand) Auckland City	6th	2012–13
UEFA (Europe)	2013–14 UEFA Champions League	(Germany) Bayern Munich	(Spain) Real Madrid	10th	2001–02
UEFA (Europe)	2013–14 UEFA Europa League	(England) Chelsea	(Spain) Sevilla	3rd	2006–07
UEFA (Europe)	2014 UEFA Super Cup	(Germany) Bayern Munich	(Spain) Real Madrid	2nd	2002
UAFA (Arab States)	2013–14 UAFA Club Cup	(Algeria) USM Alger	Cancelled	N.A.	N.A.
UAFA (Arab States)	2014 GCC Club Cup	(United Arab Emirates) Baniyas	(United Arab Emirates) Al-Nasr	1st	—
FIFA (worldwide)	2014 FIFA Club World Cup	(Germany) Bayern Munich	(Spain) Real Madrid	1st	—

=== Women ===
Region	Tournament	Defending champion	Champion	Title	Last honor
CONMEBOL (South America)	2014 Copa Libertadores Femenina	(Brazil) São José	(Brazil) São José	3rd	2013
UEFA (Europe)	2013–14 UEFA Women's Champions League	(Germany) VfL Wolfsburg	(Germany) VfL Wolfsburg	2nd	2012–13

== Domestic leagues ==
=== CONCACAF nations ===
==== Men ====
Nation	League	Champion	Title	Last honor
Belize	2014 Premier League of Belize Closing Season	Belmopan Bandits	3rd	2013 Opening Season
Mexico	2014 Liga MX Clausura	Club León	7th	2013 Apertura
Mexico	2014 Liga MX Apertura	Club America	12th	2013 Clausura
United States	2014 MLS season	LA Galaxy	5th	2012

==== Women ====
Nation	League	Champion	Title	Last honor
United States	2014 NWSL season	FC Kansas City	1st	—

=== CONMEBOL nations ===
Nation	League	Champion	Title	Last honor
Argentina	2014 Primera División Final	River Plate	36th	2008 Clausura
Argentina	2014 Primera División Transición	Racing Club	17th	2002 Clausura
Bolivia	2014 Liga Profesional Clausura	Universitario	2nd	2008 Apertura
Bolivia	2014 Liga Profesional Apertura	Bolívar	25th	2013 Clausura
Brazil	2014 Campeonato Brasileiro Série A	Cruzeiro	4th	2013
Chile	2014 Primera División Clausura	Colo-Colo	30th	2009 Clausura
Chile	2014 Primera División Apertura	Universidad de Chile	17th	2012 Apertura
Colombia	2014 Primera A Apertura	Atlético Nacional	14th	2013 Finalización
Colombia	2014 Primera A Finalización	Santa Fe	8th	2012 Apertura
Ecuador	2014 Campeonato Ecuatoriano Serie A	Emelec	12th	2013
Paraguay	2014 Primera División Apertura	Libertad	17th	2012 Clausura
Paraguay	2014 Primera División Clausura	Libertad	18th	2014 Apertura
Peru	2014 Torneo Descentralizado	Sporting Cristal	17th	2012
Uruguay	2013–14 Primera División	Danubio	4th	2006–07
Venezuela	2013–14 Primera División	Zamora	2nd	2012–13

=== AFC nations ===
==== Men ====
Nation	Tournament	Champion	Title	Last honor
Australia	2013–14 A-League	Brisbane Roar	3rd	2011–12
Bahrain	2013–14 Bahrain First Division League	Al-Riffa	11th	2011–12
Cambodia	2014 Cambodian League	Phnom Penh Crown	5th	2011
Guam	2013–14 Guam Men's Soccer League	Rovers FC	1st	–
Hong Kong	2013–14 Hong Kong First Division League	Kitchee	6th	2011–12
India	2013–14 I-League	Bengaluru FC	1st	–
Indonesia	2014 Indonesia Super League	Persib Bandung	1st	—
Iran	2013–14 Iran Pro League	Foolad	2nd	2004–05
Iraq	2013–14 Iraqi Premier League	Ended prematurely without crowning champion		
Japan	2014 J. League Division 1	Gamba Osaka	2nd	2005
Jordan	2013–14 Jordan League	Al-Wehdat	13th	2010–11
Kuwait	2013–14 Kuwaiti Premier League	Al Qadsia SC	16th	2011–12
Lebanon	2013–14 Lebanese Premier League	Al-Nejmeh	8th	2008–09
Macau	2014 Campeonato da 1ª Divisão do Futebol	Benfica de Macau	1st	–
Malaysia	2014 Malaysia Super League	Johor Darul Ta'zim F.C.	1st	—
Nepal	2013–14 Martyr's Memorial A-Division League	Manang Marshyangdi Club	7th	2005–06
Oman	2013–14 Oman Professional League	Al-Nahda	3rd	2008–09
Pakistan	2013–14 Pakistan Premier League	KRL F.C.	4th	2013–14
Palestine	2013–14 West Bank Premier League	Wadi Al-Nes	4th	2008–09
Philippines	2014 United Football League Division 1	Global	2nd	2012
Qatar	2013–14 Qatar Stars League	Lekhwiya	3rd	2011–12
Saudi Arabia	2013–14 Saudi Professional League	Al Nassr	7th	1994–95
South Korea	2014 K League Classic	Jeonbuk Hyundai Motors	3rd	2011
United Arab Emirates	2013–14 Arabian Gulf League	Al Ahli	4th	1979–80
Vietnam	2014 V.League 1	Becamex Bình Dương	3rd	2008
Yemen	2013–14 Yemeni League	Al-Saqr	3rd	2009–10

==== Women ====
Nation	Tournament	Champion	Title	Last honor
Australia	2013–14 W-League	Melbourne Victory	1st	—
Australia	2014 W-League (Note: The season was shortened to fit entirely within 2014, due to Australia hosting the Men's 2015 AFC Asian Cup. The following W-League season was held in 2015–16.)	Canberra United	2nd	2011–12
Japan	2014 L. League	Urawa Red Diamonds Ladies	3rd	2009

=== UEFA nations ===
==== Men ====
Nation	Tournament	Champion	Title	Last honor
Albania	2013–14 Albanian Superliga	Skënderbeu Korçë	5th	2012–13
Andorra	2013–14 Primera Divisió	Santa Coloma	7th	2010–11
Armenia	2013–14 Armenian Premier League	Banants	1st	—
Austria	2013–14 Austrian Football Bundesliga	Red Bull Salzburg	8th	2011–12
Azerbaijan	2013–14 Azerbaijan Premier League	Qarabağ	2nd	1993
Belarus	2014 Belarusian Premier League	BATE Borisov	11th	2013
Belgium	2013–14 Belgian Pro League	Anderlecht	33rd	2012–13
Bosnia and Herzegovina	2013–14 Premier League of Bosnia and Herzegovina	Zrinjski	3rd	2008–09
Bulgaria	2013–14 A PFG	Ludogorets Razgrad	3rd	2012–13
Croatia	2013–14 Prva HNL	Dinamo Zagreb	16th	2012–13
Cyprus	2013–14 Cypriot First Division	APOEL	23rd	2012–13
Czech Republic	2013–14 Gambrinus liga	Sparta Prague	33rd	2009–10
Denmark	2013–14 Danish Superliga	Aalborg	4th	2007–08
England	2013–14 Premier League	Manchester City	4th	2011–12
Estonia	2014 Meistriliiga	Levadia Tallinn	9th	2013
Faroe Islands	2014 Effodeildin	B36 Tórshavn	10th	2011
Finland	2014 Veikkausliiga	HJK	27th	2013
France	2013–14 Ligue 1	Paris Saint-Germain	4th	2012–13
(Georgia (country)) Georgia	2013–14 Umaglesi Liga	Dinamo Tbilisi	15th	2012–13
Germany	2013–14 Bundesliga	Bayern Munich	24th	2012–13
Gibraltar	2013–14 Gibraltar Premier Division	Lincoln	19th	2012–13
Greece	2013–14 Super League Greece	Olympiacos	41st	2012–13
Hungary	2013–14 Nemzeti Bajnokság I	Debrecen	7th	2011–12
Iceland	2014 Úrvalsdeild	Stjarnan	1st	—
(Republic of Ireland) Ireland	2014 League of Ireland	Dundalk	10th	1994–95
Israel	2013–14 Israeli Premier League	Maccabi Tel Aviv	21st	2012–13
Italy	2013–14 Serie A	Juventus	30th	2012–13
Kazakhstan	2014 Kazakhstan Premier League	FC Astana	1st	—
Latvia	2014 Latvian Higher League	Ventspils	6th	2013
Lithuania	2014 A Lyga	Žalgiris Vilnius	5th	2013
Luxembourg	2013–14 Luxembourg National Division	F91 Dudelange	11th	2011–12
(North Macedonia) Macedonia	2013–14 First Macedonian Football League	Rabotnički	4th	2007–08
Malta	2013–14 Maltese Premier League	Valletta	22nd	2011–12
Moldova	2013–14 Moldovan National Division	Sheriff Tiraspol	13th	2012–13
Montenegro	2013–14 Montenegrin First League	Sutjeska	2nd	2012–13
Netherlands	2013–14 Eredivisie	Ajax	33rd	2012–13
Northern Ireland	2013–14 NIFL Premiership	Cliftonville	5th	2012–13
Norway	2014 Tippeligaen	Molde	3rd	2012
Poland	2013–14 Ekstraklasa	Legia Warsaw	10th	2012–13
Portugal	2013–14 Primeira Liga	Benfica	33rd	2009–10
Romania	2013–14 Liga I	Steaua București	25th	2012–13
Russia	2013–14 Russian Premier League	CSKA Moscow	12th	2012–13
San Marino	2013–14 Campionato Sammarinese di Calcio	La Fiorita	3rd	1989–90
Scotland	2013–14 Scottish Premiership	Celtic	45th	2012–13
Serbia	2013–14 Serbian SuperLiga	Red Star Belgrade	26th (Note: 2nd title in modern Serbian league; title count also includes 19 in SFR Yugoslavia and 5 in Serbia and Montenegro.)	2006–07
Slovakia	2013–14 Slovak First Football League	Slovan Bratislava	8th	2012–13
Slovenia	2013–14 Slovenian PrvaLiga	Maribor	12th	2012–13
Spain	2013–14 La Liga	Atlético Madrid	10th	1995–96
Sweden	2014 Allsvenskan	Malmö	18th (Note: Malmö has 21 Allsvenskan titles, but only 18 national championships. The Allsvenskan is one of four competitions that Sweden has used to award its national title.)	2013
Switzerland	2013–14 Swiss Super League	Basel	17th	2012–13
Turkey	2013–14 Süper Lig	Fenerbahçe	19th	2010–11
Ukraine	2013–14 Ukrainian Premier League	Shakhtar Donetsk	9th	2012–13
Wales	2013–14 Welsh Premier League	The New Saints	8th	2012–13

==== Women ====
Nation	Tournament	Champion	Title	Last honor
Belgium/ Netherlands	2013–14 BeNe League	Twente	2nd	2012–13
Croatia	2013–14 Prva HNLŽ	ŽNK Osijek	18th	2012–13
Cyprus	2013–14 Cypriot First Division	Apollon Limassol	6th	2012–13
Czech Republic	2013–14 Czech First Division	Slavia Prague	3rd	2003–04
Denmark	Elitedivisionen 2013–14	Fortuna Hjørring	8th	2009–10
England	2014 FA WSL1	Liverpool	2nd	2013
France	2013–14 Division 1 Féminine	Lyon	12th	2012–13
Germany	2013–14 Frauen-Bundesliga	VfL Wolfsburg	2nd	2012–13
Norway	2014 Toppserien	LSK Kvinner	2nd	2012
Romania	2013–14 Superliga	Olimpia Cluj	4th	2012–13
Scotland	2014 Scottish Women's Premier League			
Slovenia	2013–14 Slovenian Women's League	Pomurje Beltinci	4	2012–13
Spain	2013–14 Primera División	FC Barcelona	3rd	2012–13
Sweden	2014 Damallsvenskan	FC Rosengård	9th (Note: Includes eight titles won under the club's previous names of FC Malmö Dam and LdB FC Malmö.)	2013
Wales	2013–14 Welsh Premier League	Cardiff Met. Ladies	2nd	2011–12

=== CAF nations ===
Nation	League	Champion	Title	Last honor
Egypt	2013–14 Egyptian Premier League	Al Ahly	37th	2010-11
South Africa	2013–14 South African Premier Division	Mamelodi Sundowns	6th	2006-07

=== OFC nations ===
Nation	League	Champion	Title	Last honor
New Zealand	2013–14 ASB Premiership	Auckland City FC	1st	–
Papua New Guinea	2014 National Soccer League	Hekari United	8th (all)	2014
Solomon Islands	2013–14 Telekom S-League	Solomon Warriors	2nd	2011–12
(French Polynesia) Tahiti	2013–14 Tahiti First Division	Pirae	8th	2005–06

== Domestic cups ==
=== UEFA nations ===
==== Men ====
Nation	Tournament	Champion	Title	Last honor
Albania	2013–14 Albanian Cup	Flamurtari Vlorë	4th	2008–09
Andorra	2014 Copa Constitució	Sant Julià	4th	2011
Armenia	2013–14 Armenian Cup	Pyunik	6th	2012–13
Austria	2013–14 Austrian Cup	Red Bull Salzburg	2nd	2011–12
Azerbaijan	2013–14 Azerbaijan Cup	Neftchi Baku	6th	2012–13
Belarus	2013–14 Belarusian Cup	Shakhtyor Soligorsk	2nd	2003–04
Belgium	2013–14 Belgian Cup	Lokeren	2nd	2011–12
Bosnia and Herzegovina	2013–14 Bosnia and Herzegovina Football Cup	Sarajevo	5th	2004–05
Bulgaria	2013–14 Bulgarian Cup	Ludogorets Razgrad	2nd	2011–12
Croatia	2013–14 Croatian Cup	Rijeka	3rd	2005–06
Cyprus	2013–14 Cypriot Cup	APOEL	20th	2007–08
Czech Republic	2013–14 Czech Cup	Sparta Prague	14th	2007–08
Denmark	2013–14 Danish Cup	Aalborg	3rd	1969–70
England/ Wales	2013–14 FA Cup	Arsenal	11th	2004–05
England/ Wales	2013–14 Football League Cup	Manchester City	3rd	1975–76
Estonia	2013–14 Estonian Cup	Levadia	8th	2011–12
Finland	2014 Finnish Cup	HJK	12th	2011
Finland	2014 Finnish League Cup	SJK	1st	—
France	2013–14 Coupe de France	Guingamp	2nd	2008–09
France	2013–14 Coupe de la Ligue	PSG	4th	2007–08
Germany	2013–14 DFB-Pokal	Bayern Munich	17th	2012–13
(Georgia (country)) Georgia	2013–14 Georgian Cup	Dinamo Tbilisi	11th	2012–13
Gibraltar	2013–14 League Cup (Gibraltar)	Lincoln	1st	—
Greece	2013–14 Greek Football Cup	Panathinaikos	18th	2009–10
Hungary	2013–14 Magyar Kupa	Újpest	9th	2001–02
Iceland	2014 Deildabikar	FH	6th	2009
(Republic of Ireland) Ireland	2014 FAI Cup	St Patrick's Athletic	3rd	1961
Israel	2013–14 Israel State Cup	Ironi Kiryat Shmona	1st	—
Italy	2013–14 Coppa Italia	Napoli	5th	2011–12
Latvia	2013–14 Latvian Football Cup	Jelgava	4th	2009–10
Latvia	2014 Virsligas Winter Cup	Skonto FC	1st	—
Liechtenstein	2013–14 Liechtenstein Cup	Vaduz	42nd	2012–13
Lithuania	2013–14 Lithuanian Football Cup	Žalgiris Vilnius	8th	2012–13
Luxembourg	2013–14 Luxembourg Cup	Differdange 03	3rd	2010–11
(North Macedonia) Macedonia	2013–14 Macedonian Cup	Rabotnički	3rd	2008–09
Malta	2013–14 Maltese FA Trophy	Valletta	13th	2009–10
Moldova	2013–14 Moldovan Cup	Zimbru Chișinău	6th	2006–07
Montenegro	2013–14 Montenegrin Cup	Lovćen	1st	—
Netherlands	2013–14 KNVB Cup	PEC Zwolle	1st	—
Northern Ireland	2013–14 Irish Cup	Glenavon	6th	1996–97
Northern Ireland	2013–14 Northern Ireland Football League Cup	Cliftonville	3rd	2012–13
Poland	2013–14 Polish Cup	Zawisza Bydgoszcz	1st	—
Portugal	2013–14 Taça de Portugal	Benfica	25th	2012–13
Portugal	2013–14 Taça da Liga	Benfica	5th	2011–12
Romania	2013–14 Cupa României	Astra Giurgiu	1st	—
Russia	2013–14 Russian Cup	Rostov	1st	—
San Marino	2013–14 Coppa Titano	Libertas	11th	2005–06
Scotland	2013–14 Scottish Cup	St Johnstone	1st	—
Scotland	2013–14 Scottish Challenge Cup	Raith Rovers	1st	–
Scotland	2013–14 Scottish League Cup	Aberdeen	6th	1995–96
Serbia	2013–14 Serbian Cup	Vojvodina	1st	—
Slovakia	2013–14 Slovak Cup	Košice	5th	2008–09
Slovenia	2013–14 Slovenian Cup	Gorica	3rd	2001–02
Slovenia	2014 Slovenian Supercup	Maribor	4th	2013
Spain	2013–14 Copa del Rey	Real Madrid	19th	2010–11
Sweden	2013–14 Svenska Cupen	IF Elfsborg	3rd	2003
Switzerland	2013–14 Swiss Cup	Zürich	8th	2004–05
Turkey	2013–14 Turkish Cup	Galatasaray	15th	2004–05
Ukraine	2013–14 Ukrainian Cup	Dynamo Kyiv	10th	2006–07
Wales	2013–14 Welsh Cup	The New Saints	4th	2011–12
Wales	2013–14 Welsh League Cup	Carmarthen Town	2nd	2012–13

==== Women ====
Nation	Tournament	Champion	Title	Last honor
England	2013–14 FA Women's Cup	Arsenal	13th	2012–13
Germany	2013–14 Frauen DFB-Pokal	1. FFC Frankfurt	9th	2010–11
Slovenia	2013–14 Slovenian Women's Cup	Pomurje Beltinci	5	2012–13
Spain	2014 Copa de la Reina	FC Barcelona	4th	2013
Sweden	2013–14 Svenska Cupen	Linköpings FC	4th	2009

=== AFC nations ===
Nation	Tournament	Champion	Title	Last honor
Australia	2014 FFA Cup (inaugural event)	Adelaide United	1st	—
India	2013–14 Indian Federation Cup	Churchill Brothers		—
Iran	2013–14 Hazfi Cup	Tractor Sazi	1st	—
Japan	2014 Emperor's Cup	Gamba Osaka	3rd	2009
Palestine	Palestine Cup	Hilal Al-Quds	3rd	2010–11
Uzbekistan	2014 PFL CUP	FK Mash'al Mubarek	1st	—
Vietnam	2014 Vietnamese Cup	Hải Phòng	2nd	1995

=== CONCACAF nations ===
Nation	Tournament	Champion	Title	Last honor
Canada	2014 Canadian Championship	Montreal Impact	3rd (Note: Two titles won by current MLS team; the team also claims the 2008 title won by its predecessor of the same name.)	2013
Costa Rica	2014 Costa Rican Cup	Cartaginés	1st	—
Grenada	2014 Waggy T Super Knockout Tournament	Hurricane	2nd	2011
Haiti	2014 Super Huit	America des Cayes	1st	—
Jamaica	2014 JFF Champions Cup	Reno	3rd	1995–96
Mexico	Clausura 2014 Copa MX	UANL	3rd	1995–96
Mexico	Apertura 2014 Copa MX	Santos Laguna	1st	—
United States	2014 Lamar Hunt U.S. Open Cup	Seattle Sounders FC	4th	2011

=== CONMEBOL nations ===
==== Men ====
Nation	League	Champion	Title	Last honor
Argentina	2013–14 Copa Argentina	Huracán	1st	—
Brazil	2014 Copa do Brasil	Atlético Mineiro	1st	—
Chile	2013–14 Copa Chile	Deportes Iquique	3rd	2010
Colombia	2014 Copa Colombia	Deportes Tolima	1st	—
Peru	2014 Torneo del Inca	Alianza Lima	1st	—
Venezuela	2014 Copa Venezuela	Deportivo La Guaira	1st	—

==== Women ====
Nation	League	Champion	Title	Last honor
Brazil	2014 Copa do Brasil de Futebol Feminino	Associação Ferroviária de Esportes	1st	—

=== CAF nations ===
Nation	League	Champion	Title	Last honor
Algeria	2013–14 Algerian Cup	MC Alger	7th	2006–07
Kenya	2014 FKF President's Cup	Sofapaka	3rd	2010
South Africa	2013–14 Nedbank Cup	Orlando Pirates	8th	2011

== Second, third, fourth, and fifth leagues ==
=== CONCACAF nations ===
Nation	League	Champion	Final score	Second place	Title	Last honour
Canada	2014 Première Ligue de soccer du Québec	CS Longueuil		FC Gatineau	1st	
Canada	2014 Canadian Soccer League	York Region Shooters	1–0	Toronto Croatia	2nd	2006

== Deaths ==
=== January ===
- 1 January: Josep Seguer, Spanish international footballer and manager (born 1923)
- 5 January: Eusébio, Portuguese international footballer (born 1942)
- 5 January: Mustapha Zitouni, Algerian-French defender, capped for the France national football team, the FLN football team and the Algeria national football team. (85)
- 13 January: Bobby Collins, Scottish international footballer (born 1931)
- 15 January: Gennadi Matveyev, Soviet international footballer (born 1937)
- 19 January: Bert Williams, English international goalkeeper (born 1920)
- 25 January: Milan Ružić, Yugoslavian international footballer (born 1955)

=== February ===
- 1 February: Luis Aragonés, Spanish international football player and manager (born 1938)
- 1 February: Stefan Bozhkov, Bulgarian international footballer (born 1923)
- 8 February: Philippe Mahut, French international footballer (born 1956)
- 10 February: Gordon Harris, English international footballer (born 1940)
- 12 February: Josef Röhrig, German international footballer (born 1925)
- 13 February: Jimmy Jones, Northern Irish international footballer (born 1928)
- 13 February: Richard Møller Nielsen, Danish international footballer and manager (born 1937)
- 14 February: Tom Finney, English international footballer (born 1922)
- 19 February: Antonio Benítez, Spanish international footballer (born 1951)
- 19 February: Kresten Bjerre, Danish international footballer and coach (born 1946)
- 25 February: Mário Coluna, Portuguese international footballer and manager (born 1935)
- 26 February: Dezső Novák, Hungarian international footballer (born 1939)
- 28 February: Kevon Carter, Trinidadian international footballer (born 1983)

=== March ===
- 4 March: László Fekete, Hungarian international footballer (born 1954)
- 6 March: Luis Rentería, Panamanian international footballer (born 1988)
- 12 March: René Llense, French international footballer (born 1913)
- 13 March: Petar Miloševski, Macedonian international footballer (born 1973)
- 15 March: Jürgen Kurbjuhn, German international footballer (born 1940)
- 20 March: Hilderaldo Bellini, Brazilian international footballer (born 1930)
- 27 March: Augustin Deleanu, Romanian international footballer (born 1944)
- 30 March: Fred Stansfield, Welsh international footballer (born 1917)

=== April ===
- 8 April: Herbert Schoen, East German international footballer (born 1929)
- 15 April: Claudio Tello, Chilean international footballer (born 1963)
- 16 April: Aulis Rytkönen, Finnish international footballer (born 1929)
- 24 April: Sandy Jardine, Scottish international footballer and manager (born 1948)
- 25 April: Francesc Vilanova, Spanish footballer and manager (born 1968)
- 27 April: Vujadin Boškov, Yugoslav international football player and coach (born 1931)
- 29 April: Tahar Chaïbi, Tunisian international footballer (born 1946)

=== May ===
- 1 May: Georg Stollenwerk, German international footballer and trainer (born 1930)
- 8 May: Henning Elting, Danish international footballer (born 1925)
- 21 May: Duncan Cole, New Zealand international footballer (born 1958)
- 23 May: Joel Camargo, Brazilian international footballer (born 1946)
- 25 May: Washington César Santos, Brazilian international footballer (born 1960)
- 31 May: Marinho Chagas, Brazilian international footballer (born 1952)

=== June ===
- 2 June: Gennadi Gusarov, Soviet international footballer (born 1937)
- 2 June: Phạm Huỳnh Tam Lang, Vietnamese international footballer and coach (born 1942)
- 13 June: Gyula Grosics, Hungarian international football player and manager (born 1926)

=== July ===
- 3 July: Volkmar Groß, German international footballer (born 1948)
- 7 July: Alfredo Di Stéfano, Argentine-Spanish international footballer and coach (born 1926)
- 14 July: Vasile Zavoda, Romanian international footballer (born 1929)
- 19 July: Petar Nikezić, Yugoslavian-Serbian international footballer (born 1950)

=== August ===
- 1 August: Valyantsin Byalkevich, Belaurusian football player (born 1973)
- 3 August: Wimper Guerrero, Ecuadorian football midfielder (born 1982)
- 3 August: Helmut Faeder, German footballer (born 1935)
- 4 August: Rodolfo Motta, Argentine footballer and coach (born 1944)
- 4 August: Rodrigo Osorio, Salvadoran footballer
- 6 August: Jimmy Walsh, English footballer (born 1930)
- 7 August: Alberto Pérez Zabala, Spanish footballer (born 1925)
- 8 August: Viktor Kopyl, Ukrainian footballer (born 1960)
- 9 August: Andriy Bal, Ukrainian football midfielder and coach (born 1958)
- 11 August: Vladimir Beara, Yugoslav football player (born 1928)
- 11 August: Djalma Cavalcante, Brazilian football player (born 1957)
- 11 August: Stelio Nardin, Italian footballer (born 1939)
- 12 August: Kazimierz Trampisz, Polish footballer (born 1929)
- 13 August: Kurt Tschenscher, German football referee (born 1928)
- 13 August: Süleyman Seba, Turkish footballer (born 1926)
- 14 August: Géza Gulyás, Hungarian footballer (born 1931)
- 14 August: Javier Guzmán, Mexican football defender (born 1945)
- 15 August: Bruno Petroni, Italian footballer (born 1941)
- 15 August: Ferdinando Riva, Swiss footballer (born 1930)
- 17 August: Sammy Conn, Scottish footballer (born 1961)
- 18 August: Jean Nicolay, Belgian football goalkeeper (born 1937)
- 19 August: Carlos Arango, Colombian footballer (born 1928)
- 20 August: Eric Barber, Irish footballer (born 1942)
- 20 August: José Luis Saldívar, Mexican footballer
- 21 August: Don Clark, English footballer (born 1917)
- 22 August: Pete Ladygo, American football player (born 1928)
- 23 August: Albert Ebossé Bodjongo, Cameroonian international footballer (born 1989)
- 27 August: Jean-François Beltramini, French footballer (born 1948)
- 27 August: Bobby Kinloch, Scottish footballer (born 1935)
- 28 August: Carlos Alberto Etcheverry, Argentine football player (born 1933)
- 28 August: Fernando Zunzunegui, Spanish footballer (born 1943)

=== September ===
- 4 September: Willie Finlay, Scottish footballer (born 1926)
- 6 September: Arne Amundsen, Norwegian football goalkeeper (born 1952)
- 7 September: Nikolay Adamets, Belarusian footballer (born 1982)
- 9 September: David Whyte, English footballer (born 1971)
- 10 September: Károly Sándor, Hungarian international footballer (born 1928)
- 10 September: Joakim Vislavski, Serbian footballer (born 1940)
- 12 September: Harold Williams, Welsh international footballer (born 1924)
- 13 September: Milan Galić, Serbian footballer (born 1938)
- 16 September: Dinis Vital, Portuguese footballer (born 1932)
- 17 September: Andriy Husin, Ukrainian international footballer and coach (born 1972)
- 22 September: Fernando Cabrita, Portuguese international footballer and manager (born 1923)
- 22 September: Billy Neil, Scottish footballer (born 1939)
- 23 September: John Divers, Scottish footballer (born 1940)
- 25 September: Vladimir Dolbonosov, Russian footballer (born 1949)
- 28 September: Tim Rawlings, English footballer (born 1932)
- 29 September: Hugh Doherty, Irish footballer (born 1921)
- 29 September: Len Stephenson, English footballer (born 1930)

=== October ===
- 3 October: Jean-Jacques Marcel, French international footballer (born 1931)
- 3 October: Lori Sandri, Brazilian football manager (born 1949)
- 4 October: Fyodor Cherenkov, Soviet and Russian international footballer and manager (born 1959)
- 6 October: Feridun Buğeker, Turkish international footballer (born 1933)
- 6 October: Mikhail Potylchak, Russian footballer (born 1972)
- 6 October: Serhiy Zakarlyuka, Ukrainian footballer (born 1976)
- 7 October: Amos Mkhari, South African footballer
- 7 October: Nika Kiladze, Georgian footballer (born 1988)
- 9 October: Henning Bjerregaard, Danish footballer (born 1927)
- 10 October: Roy Law, English footballer (born 1937)
- 11 October: Carmelo Simeone, Argentine international footballer (born 1933)
- 12 October: Roberto Telch, Argentine international footballer (born 1943)
- 13 October: Pontus Segerström, Swedish footballer (born 1981)
- 16 October: Shalom Schwarz, Israeli footballer (born 1951)
- 17 October: Daisuke Oku, Japanese international footballer (born 1976)
- 17 October: Gero Bisanz, German footballer (born 1935)
- 17 October: Vladimír Hrivnák, Slovak footballer (born 1945)
- 18 October: Danny Light, English footballer (born 1948)
- 19 October: Arnold Mitchell, English footballer (born 1929)
- 19 October: Don Ratcliffe, English footballer (born 1934)
- 19 October: Jim Sharkey, English footballer (born 1934)
- 21 October: Jim Barrett, Jr., English footballer (born 1930)
- 22 October: Anatoly Chertkov, Russian footballer (born 1936)
- 22 October: George Francis, English footballer (born 1934)
- 23 October: André Piters, Belgian international footballer (born 1931)
- 24 October: Martin Garratt, English footballer (born 1980)
- 24 October: Malcolm Thompson, English footballer (born 1946)
- 26 October: Senzo Meyiwa, South African footballer (born 1984)
- 27 October: Leif Skiöld, Swedish international footballer and ice hockey player (born 1935)
- 27 October: Reidar Sundby, Norwegian footballer (born 1926)
- 29 October: Klas Ingesson, Swedish international footballer and manager (born 1968)
- 29 October: Rainer Hasler, Liechtenstein footballer (born 1958)
- 30 October: Joe Brown, English footballer (born 1929)
- 31 October: Armando Cavazzuti, Italian footballer (born 1929)
- 31 October: Pat Partridge, British football referee (born 1933)

=== November ===
- 1 November: Gustau Biosca, Spanish international footballer and manager (born 1928)
- 1 November: Edson Décimo Alves Araújo, Brazilian footballer (born 1986)
- 1 November: Ivor Seemley, English footballer (born 1929)
- 1 November: Abednigo Ngcobo, South African footballer (born 1950)
- 2 November: Vladimir Suchilin, Soviet footballer (born 1950)
- 3 November: Geoff Cox, English footballer (born 1934)
- 4 November: Derek Hogg, English footballer (born 1930)
- 4 November: Eddie Stuart, South African footballer (born 1931)
- 5 November: Mario Pietruzzi, Italian footballer (born 1918)
- 5 November: Roy Hartle, English footballer (born 1931)
- 7 November: Juan Taverna, Argentine footballer (born 1948)
- 8 November: Giovan Battista Pirovano, Italian footballer (born 1937)
- 8 November: Sammy Wilson, Scottish footballer (born 1937)
- 9 November: Sammy Reid, Scottish footballer (born 1939)
- 11 November: Jim Storrie, Scottish footballer (born 1940)
- 13 November: Gus Cremins, Irish Gaelic footballer (born 1921)
- 14 November: Kjell Hvidsand, Norwegian footballer (born 1941)
- 14 November: Zaki Osman, Egyptian footballer
- 14 November: Peter Rajah, Malaysian footballer
- 15 November: Valéry Mézague, Cameroonian international footballer (born 1983)
- 17 November: Ilija Pantelić, Serbian Yugoslav international footballer (born 1942)
- 18 November: Iain Hesford, English footballer (born 1960)
- 19 November: Gholam Hossein Mazloumi, Iranian international footballer and manager (born 1950)
- 22 November: Sar Sophea, Cambodian international footballer (born 1992)
- 23 November: John Neal, English footballer (born 1932)
- 24 November: Reg Foulkes, English footballer (born 1923)
- 25 November: Aurelio Milani, Italian footballer (born 1934)
- 26 November: Malcolm Finlayson, Scottish footballer (born 1930)
- 26 November: Ángel Tulio Zof, Argentine footballer (born 1928)
- 26 November: Fikret Kırcan, Turkish footballer (born 1919)
- 27 November: August Gottschalk, German footballer (born 1921)
- 28 November: Lucidio Sentimenti, Italian footballer (born 1920)
- 29 November: Ahmad Wartam, Singapore international footballer (born 1935)

=== December ===
- 1 December: Jimmy Duncan, Scottish footballer (born 1930)
- 4 December: Sitamadji Allarassem, Chadian footballer (born 1988)
- 6 December: Juan Antonio Merlos, Salvadoran football player (born 1941)
- 7 December: Tommy Todd, Scottish footballer (born 1926)
- 7 December: Jerzy Wilim, Polish footballer (born 1941)
- 9 December: Blagoje Paunović, Serbian footballer (born 1947)
- 11 December: Benigno De Grandi, Italia footballer (born 1924)
- 12 December: John Baxter, Scottish footballer (born 1936)
- 12 December: José María Lorant, Argentine footballer (born 1955)
- 15 December: Nicolae Manea, Romanian footballer (born 1954)
- 16 December: Reidar Dørum, Norwegian footballer (born 1925)
- 18 December: Ante Žanetić, Croatian footballer (born 1936)
- 19 December: Pat Holton, Scottish footballer (born 1935)
- 20 December: Seriki Audu, Scottish footballer (born 1991)
- 20 December: Sam Morris, English footballer (born 1930)
- 21 December: Åke Johansson, Swedish international footballer (born 1928)
- 22 December: Moses Otolorin, Nigerian footballer
- 23 December: Luis Condomi, Argentine footballer (born 1948)
- 24 December: Rubén Amorín, Uruguayan footballer (born 1927)
- 25 December: Ihor Nadein, Ukrainian footballer (born 1948)
- 27 December: Ron Henry, English international footballer (born 1934)
- 27 December: Erich Retter; German international footballer (born 1925)
- 28 December: Javier Fragoso, Mexican international footballer (born 1942)
- 29 December: Odd Iversen, Norwegian international footballer (born 1945)
- 29 December: Samuel Sentini, Honduran international footballer (born c. 1948)
- 30 December: Igor Kiselyov, Russian footballer (born 1979)
- 30 December: Walter Roque, Uruguayan footballer (born 1937)
- 31 December: Jimmy Dunn, Scottish footballer (born 1923)
- 31 December: Romanus Orjinta, Nigerian footballer (born 1981)
- 31 December: Luis Oruezábal, Argentine footballer (born 1952)
