= 2014–15 in Scottish football =

Football in Scotland
- Season: 2014–15

2014–15 in Scottish football

Premiership champions
- Celtic

Championship champions
- Heart of Midlothian

League 1 champions
- Greenock Morton

League 2 champions
- Albion Rovers

Scottish Cup winners
- Inverness Caledonian Thistle

League Cup winners
- Celtic

Challenge Cup winners
- Livingston

Youth Cup winners
- Celtic

Teams in Europe
- Celtic, Aberdeen, Motherwell, St Johnstone

Scotland national team
- UEFA Euro 2016 qualifying

The 2014–15 season was the 118th season of competitive football in Scotland. The domestic season began on 26 July 2014, with the start of the Challenge Cup. The 2014–15 Scottish Professional Football League season commenced on 9 August, the weekend after the conclusion of the 2014 Commonwealth Games.

== League competitions ==
=== Scottish Premiership ===
Pos	Team	Pld	W	D	L	GF	GA	GD	Pts	Qualification or relegation
1	Celtic (C)	38	29	5	4	84	17	+67	92	Qualification for the Champions League second qualifying round
2	Aberdeen	38	23	6	9	57	33	+24	75	Qualification for the Europa League first qualifying round
3	Inverness Caledonian Thistle	38	19	8	11	52	42	+10	65	Qualification for the Europa League second qualifying round (Note: Inverness Caledonian Thistle qualified for the second qualifying round of the UEFA Europa League by winning the 2014–15 Scottish Cup.)
4	St Johnstone	38	16	9	13	34	34	0	57	Qualification for the Europa League first qualifying round
5	Dundee United	38	17	5	16	58	56	+2	56	
6	Dundee (Note: Teams in the bottom six at the time of the split (33 games) cannot pass teams in the top six)	38	11	12	15	46	57	−11	45	
7	Hamilton Academical	38	15	8	15	50	53	−3	53	
8	Partick Thistle	38	12	10	16	48	44	+4	46	
9	Ross County	38	12	8	18	46	63	−17	44	
10	Kilmarnock	38	11	8	19	44	59	−15	41	
11	Motherwell (O)	38	10	6	22	38	63	−25	36	Qualification for the Premiership play-off final
12	St Mirren (R)	38	9	3	26	30	66	−36	30	Relegation to the Championship

Source: SPFL
Rules for classification: 1) points; 2) goal difference; 3) number of goals scored
(C) Champions; (O) Play-off winners; (R) Relegated

=== Scottish Championship ===
Pos	Team	Pld	W	D	L	GF	GA	GD	Pts	Promotion, qualification or relegation
1	Heart of Midlothian (C, P)	36	29	4	3	96	26	+70	91	Promotion to the Premiership
2	Hibernian	36	21	7	8	70	32	+38	70	Qualification for the Premiership play-off semi-final
3	Rangers	36	19	10	7	69	39	+30	67	Qualification for the Premiership play-off quarter-final
4	Queen of the South	36	17	9	10	58	41	+17	60	Qualification for the Premiership play-off quarter-final
5	Falkirk	36	14	11	11	48	48	0	53	
6	Raith Rovers	36	12	7	17	42	65	−23	43	
7	Dumbarton	36	9	7	20	36	79	−43	34	
8	Livingston (Note: Livingston were deducted 5 points due to failure of tax payments.)	36	8	8	20	41	53	−12	27	
9	Alloa Athletic (O)	36	6	9	21	34	56	−22	27	Qualification for the Championship play-offs
10	Cowdenbeath (R)	36	7	4	25	31	86	−55	25	Relegation to League One

Source: Soccerway
Rules for classification: 1) Points; 2) Goal difference; 3) Number of goals scored
(C) Champions; (O) Play-off winners; (P) Promoted; (R) Relegated

=== Scottish League One ===
Pos	Team	Pld	W	D	L	GF	GA	GD	Pts	Promotion or relegation
1	Greenock Morton (C, P)	36	22	3	11	65	40	+25	69	Promotion to the Championship
2	Stranraer	36	20	7	9	59	38	+21	67	Qualification for the Championship play-offs
3	Forfar Athletic	36	20	6	10	59	43	+16	66	Qualification for the Championship play-offs
4	Brechin City	36	15	14	7	58	46	+12	59	Qualification for the Championship play-offs
5	Airdrieonians	36	16	10	10	53	39	+14	58	
6	Peterhead	36	14	9	13	51	54	−3	51	
7	Dunfermline Athletic	36	13	9	14	46	48	−2	48	
8	Ayr United	36	9	7	20	45	60	−15	34	
9	Stenhousemuir (O)	36	8	5	23	42	63	−21	29	Qualification for the League One play-offs
10	Stirling Albion (R)	36	4	8	24	35	84	−49	20	Relegation to League Two

Source: SPFL
Rules for classification: 1) points; 2) goal difference; 3) number of goals scored.
(C) Champions; (O) Play-off winners; (P) Promoted; (R) Relegated

=== Scottish League Two ===
Pos	Team	Pld	W	D	L	GF	GA	GD	Pts	Promotion or relegation
1	Albion Rovers (C, P)	36	22	5	9	61	33	+28	71	Promotion to League One
2	Queen's Park	36	17	10	9	51	34	+17	61	Qualification for the League One play-offs
3	Arbroath	36	16	8	12	65	46	+19	56	Qualification for the League One play-offs
4	East Fife	36	15	8	13	56	48	+8	53	Qualification for the League One play-offs
5	Annan Athletic	36	14	8	14	56	56	0	50	
6	Clyde	36	13	8	15	40	50	−10	47	
7	Elgin City	36	12	9	15	55	58	−3	45	
8	Berwick Rangers	36	11	10	15	60	57	+3	43	
9	East Stirlingshire	36	13	4	19	40	66	−26	43	
10	Montrose (O)	36	9	6	21	42	78	−36	33	Qualification for the League Two play-off final

Source: SPFL
Rules for classification: 1) points; 2) goal difference; 3) number of goals scored.
(C) Champions; (O) Play-off winners; (P) Promoted

=== Non-league football ===
==== Level 5 ====
Highland Football League
Pos	Team	Pld	Pts
1	Brora Rangers (C)	34	94
2	Turriff United	34	83
3	Cove Rangers	34	73
4	Wick Academy	34	72
5	Fraserburgh	34	65
6	Formartine United	34	64
7	Inverurie Loco Works	34	63
8	Nairn County	34	57
9	Forres Mechanics	34	57
10	Buckie Thistle	34	50
11	Clachnacuddin	34	45
12	Deveronvale	34	36
13	Fort William	34	27
14	Keith	34	24
15	Lossiemouth	34	23
16	Huntly	34	20
17	Strathspey Thistle	34	14
18	Rothes	34	11

Source: Highland Football League
(C) Champions

Lowland Football League
Pos	Team	Pld	Pts
1	Edinburgh City (C)	26	69
2	East Kilbride	26	50
3	Gretna 2008	26	45
4	Dalbeattie Star	26	42
5	The Spartans	26	42
6	Stirling University	26	42
7	Whitehill Welfare	26	40
8	Gala Fairydean Rovers	26	34
9	Vale of Leithen	26	33
10	BSC Glasgow	26	30
11	Edinburgh University	26	28
12	Selkirk	26	23
13	Preston Athletic	26	14
14	Threave Rovers	26	11

Source: SLFL Soccerway
(C) Champions

==== Level 6 ====
East of Scotland Football League Premier Division
Pos	Team	Pld	Pts
1	Lothian Thistle Hutchison Vale (C)	24	52
2	Easthouses Lily	24	52
3	Leith Athletic	24	47
4	Tynecastle	24	34
5	Civil Service Strollers	24	33
6	Spartans reserves	24	32
7	Stirling University reserves	24	19
8	Craigroyston	24	18
9	Coldstream	24	13

Source: East of Scotland Football League
(C) Champions

South of Scotland Football League
Pos	Team	Pld	Pts
1	Wigtown & Bladnoch (C)	26	66
2	Newton Stewart	26	54
3	St Cuthbert Wanderers	26	54
4	Lochar Thistle	26	52
5	Edusport Academy	26	47
6	Heston Rovers	26	43
7	Abbey Vale	26	38
8	Fleet Star	26	37
9	Crichton	26	32
10	Mid-Annandale	26	27
11	Upper Annandale	26	25
12	Creetown	26	25
13	Nithsdale Wanderers	26	22
14	Dumfries YMCA	26	1

Source: South of Scotland Football League
(C) Champions

== Honours ==
=== Cup honours ===
Competition	Winner	Score	Runner-up	Match report
2014–15 Scottish Cup	Inverness Caledonian Thistle	2–1	Falkirk	BBC Sport
2014–15 League Cup	Celtic	2–0	Dundee United	BBC Sport
2014–15 Challenge Cup	Livingston	4–0	Alloa Athletic	BBC Sport
2014–15 Youth Cup	Celtic	5–2	Rangers	BBC Sport
2014–15 Junior Cup	Auchinleck Talbot	2–1	Musselburgh Athletic	BBC Sport

=== Non-league honours ===
==== Senior ====
Competition	Winner
Highland League	Brora Rangers
Lowland League	Edinburgh City
East of Scotland League	Lothian Thistle Hutchison Vale
South of Scotland League	Wigtown & Bladnoch

==== Junior ====
West Region

Division	Winner
2014–15 Super League Premier Division	Auchinleck Talbot
Super League First Division	Pollok
Ayrshire District League	Ardrossan Winton Rovers
Central District League First Division	Blantyre Victoria
Central District League Second Division	Rossvale

East Region

Division	Winner
2014–15 Superleague	Kelty Hearts
Premier League	Tayport
North Division	Thornton Hibs
South Division	Haddington Athletic

North Region

Division	Winner
2014–15 Superleague	Hermes
First Division (West)	Grantown
First Division (East)	Bridge of Don Thistle

=== Individual honours ===
==== PFA Scotland awards ====
Award	Winner	Team
Players' Player of the Year	Stefan Johansen	Celtic
Young Player of the Year	Jason Denayer	Celtic
Manager of the Year	John Hughes	Inverness Caledonian Thistle
Championship Player of Year	Scott Allan	Hibernian
League One Player of Year	Declan McManus	Greenock Morton
League Two Player of Year	Bobby Linn	Arbroath

==== SFWA awards ====
Award	Winner	Team
Footballer of the Year	Craig Gordon	Celtic
Young Player of the Year	Ryan Christie	Inverness Caledonian Thistle
Manager of the Year	John Hughes	Inverness Caledonian Thistle
International Player of the Year	Ikechi Anya	Watford

== Scottish clubs in Europe ==
=== Celtic ===
Celtic played their first two home European ties in 2014–15 at Murrayfield Stadium in Edinburgh because their normal home stadium, Celtic Park, was used for the opening ceremony of the 2014 Commonwealth Games. In their third qualifying round tie, Celtic lost 4–1 to Legia Warsaw in Poland and 2–0 at Murrayfield, which appeared to give Legia a 6–1 aggregate victory. The result of the second game was annulled by UEFA because Legia had fielded a player who should have been serving a suspension. Celtic were instead given a 3–0 victory in the second leg, which meant that they won the tie on the away goals rule. Celtic progressed to the Champions League playoff round, but then dropped into the Europa League groups after losing 2–1 on aggregate to Slovenian club Maribor.

2014–15 UEFA Champions League

15 July 2014 Second qualifying round	KR (Iceland)	0–1	(Scotland) Celtic	Reykjavík
20:00 BST		Report	McGregor 84'	Stadium: KR-völlur; Attendance: 2,781; Referee: Andreas Pappas (Greece)

22 July 2014 Second qualifying round	Celtic (Scotland)	4–0 (5–0 agg.)	(Iceland) KR	Edinburgh
19:45 BST	van Dijk 13', 20'; Pukki 27', 71'	Report		Stadium: Murrayfield Stadium; Attendance: 36,000; Referee: Andris Treimanis (Latvia)

30 July 2014 Third qualifying round	Legia Warsaw (Poland)	4–1	(Scotland) Celtic	Warsaw
19:45 BST	Radovic 10', 36'; Zyro 84'; Kosecki 90+1'	Report	McGregor 8'	Stadium: Polish Army Stadium; Attendance: 24,000; Referee: Pol van Boekel (Netherlands)

6 August 2014 Third qualifying round	Celtic (Scotland)	3–0 (4–4 agg.)	(Poland) Legia Warsaw	Edinburgh
19:45 BST		Report	Zyro 36'; Kucharczyk 61'	Stadium: Murrayfield Stadium; Attendance: 35,000; Referee: Paolo Mazzoleni (Italy)

20 August 2014 Play-off round	NK Maribor (Slovenia)	1–1	(Scotland) Celtic	Maribor
19:45 BST	Bohar 14'	Report	McGregor 6'	Stadium: Ljudski vrt Referee: Pavel Kralovec (Czech Republic)

26 August 2014 Play-off round	Celtic (Scotland)	0–1 (1–2 agg.)	(Slovenia) NK Maribor	Glasgow
19:45 BST		Report	Tavares 75'	Stadium: Celtic Park; Referee: Viktor Kassai (Hungary)

2014–15 UEFA Europa League

18 September 2014 Group D	Red Bull Salzburg (Austria)	2–2	(Scotland) Celtic	Salzburg
18:00 BST	Alan 36'; Soriano 78'	Report	Wakaso 14'; Brown 60'	Stadium: Red Bull Arena; Referee: Artur Dias Soares (Portugal)

2 October 2014 Group D	Celtic (Scotland)	1–0	(Croatia) Dinamo Zagreb	Glasgow
20:05 BST	Commons 6'	Report		Stadium: Celtic Park; Referee: Sébastien Delferière (Belgium)

23 October 2014 Group D	Celtic (Scotland)	2–1	(Romania) Astra Giurgiu	Glasgow
20:05 BST	Scepovic 73'; Johansen 79'	Report	Enache 81'	Stadium: Celtic Park; Referee: Kristinn Jakobsson (Iceland)

6 November 2014 Group D	Astra Giurgiu (Romania)	1–1	(Scotland) Celtic	Giurgiu
18:00 GMT	Amorim 79'	Report	Johansen 32'	Stadium: Stadionul Marin Anastasovici; Referee: Serhiy Boyko (Ukraine)

27 November 2014 Group D	Celtic (Scotland)	1–3	(Austria) Red Bull Salzburg	Glasgow
20:05 GMT	Johansen 30'	Report	Alan 8', 13'; Keïta 90'	Stadium: Celtic Park; Referee: Halis Özkahya (Turkey)

11 December 2014 Group D	Dinamo Zagreb (Croatia)	4–3	(Scotland) Celtic	Zagreb
18:00 GMT	Pjaca 14', 39', 50'; Brozovic 48'	Report	Commons 23'; Scepovic 29'; Pivaric 81' (o.g.)	Stadium: Stadion Maksimir; Referee: Gediminas Mazeika (Lithuania)

19 February 2015 Round of 32	Celtic (Scotland)	3–3	(Italy) Inter Milan	Glasgow
20:05 GMT	Armstrong 24'; Campagnaro 25' (o.g.); Guidetti 90+3'	BBC Sport	Shaqiri 4'; Palacio 13', 45'	Stadium: Celtic Park; Referee: István Vad (Hungary)

26 February 2015 Round of 32	Inter Milan (Italy)	1–0 (4–3 agg.)	(Scotland) Celtic	Milan
18:00 GMT	Guarin 88'	BBC Sport		Stadium: Stadio Giuseppe Meazza; Referee: Ivan Kruzliak (Slovakia)

=== Aberdeen ===
2014–15 UEFA Europa League

3 July 2014 First qualifying round	Aberdeen (Scotland)	5–0	(Latvia) Daugava Riga	Aberdeen
19:45 BST	Logan 33'; McGinn 49'; Rooney 52' (pen.), 92'; Hayes 73'	Report		Stadium: Pittodrie Stadium; Attendance: 15,184; Referee: Nicolas Rainville (France)

10 July 2014 First qualifying round	Daugava Riga (Latvia)	0–3 (0–8 agg.)	(Scotland) Aberdeen	Riga
17:30 BST		Report	Rooney 22', 40', 45'	Stadium: Daugava Stadium; Attendance: 600; Referee: Mikhail Vilkov (Russia)

17 July 2014 Second qualifying round	Aberdeen (Scotland)	0–0	(Netherlands) Groningen	Aberdeen
19:45 BST		Report		Stadium: Pittodrie Stadium; Attendance: 16,523; Referee: Hugo Miguel (Portugal)

24 July 2014 Second qualifying round	Groningen (Netherlands)	1–2 (1–2 agg.)	(Scotland) Aberdeen	Groningen
18:30 BST	Kieftenbeld 44'	Report	Rooney 26' (pen.); McGinn 33'	Stadium: Euroborg; Attendance: 22,550; Referee: Daniel Stefański (Poland)

31 July 2014 Third qualifying round	Real Sociedad (Spain)	2–0	(Scotland) Aberdeen	San Sebastián
19:30 BST	Zurutuza 53'; Canales 68'	Report		Stadium: Anoeta Stadium; Attendance: 15,000; Referee: Bastian Dankert (Germany)

7 August 2014 Third qualifying round	Aberdeen (Scotland)	2–3 (2–5 agg.)	(Spain) Real Sociedad	Aberdeen
19:45 BST	Pawlett 44'; Reynolds 57'	Report	Prieto 28', 86' (pen.); Bergara 90+1'	Stadium: Pittodrie Stadium; Attendance: 17,676; Referee: Eitan Shemeulevitch (Israel)

=== Motherwell ===
2014–15 UEFA Europa League

17 July 2014 Second qualifying round	Motherwell (Scotland)	2–2	(Iceland) Stjarnan	Motherwell
19:45 BST	Law 9', 19'	Report	Finsen 35' (pen.), 90+2' (pen.)	Stadium: Fir Park; Attendance: 4,877; Referee: Michael Johansen (Denmark)

24 July 2014 Second qualifying round	Stjarnan (Iceland)	3–2 (a.e.t.) (5–4 agg.)	(Scotland) Motherwell	Garðabær
20:15 BST	Finsen 38' (pen.); Toft 85'; A. Jóhannsson 114'	Report	Hammell 11'; Ainsworth 66'	Stadium: Stjörnuvöllur; Attendance: 1,021; Referee: Athanasios Giachos (Greece)

=== St Johnstone ===
2014–15 UEFA Europa League

17 July 2014 Second qualifying round	Luzern (Switzerland)	1–1	(Scotland) St Johnstone	Lucerne
18:30 BST	Schneuwly 67'	Report	MacLean 47'	Stadium: Swissporarena; Attendance: 10,000; Referee: Benoît Bastien (France)

24 July 2014 Second qualifying round	St Johnstone (Scotland)	1–1 (a.e.t.) (2–2 agg.) (5–4 p)	(Switzerland) Luzern	Perth
19:45 BST	May 22' (pen.)	Report	Schneuwly 60'	Stadium: McDiarmid Park; Attendance: 8,486; Referee: Jonathan Lardot (Belgium)
	Penalties
	MacLean (penalty scored); Caddis (penalty scored); Mackay (penalty scored); May (penalty scored); Scobbie (penalty scored)		(penalty scored) Freuler; (penalty missed) Schneuwly; (penalty scored) Thiesson; (penalty scored) Wiss; (penalty scored) Winter

31 July 2014 Third qualifying round	St Johnstone (Scotland)	1–2	(Slovakia) Spartak Trnava	Perth
19:45 BST	Mackay 90+3'	Report	Schranz 34', 63'	Stadium: McDiarmid Park; Attendance: 7,001; Referee: Mattias Gestranius (Finland)

7 August 2014 Third qualifying round	Spartak Trnava (Slovakia)	1–1 (3–2 agg.)	(Scotland) St Johnstone	Zlaté Moravce
18:30 BST	Mikovič 82'	Report	May 42'	Stadium: Štadión FC ViOn; Attendance: 3,884; Referee: Javier Estrada Fernández (Spain)

== Scotland national team ==
7 September 2014 Group D	Germany	2–1	Scotland	Dortmund
	Muller 18', 70'	Report	Anya 66'	Stadium: Westfalenstadion; Attendance: 60,209; Referee: Svein Oddvar Moen (Norway)

11 October 2014 Group D	Scotland	1–0	Georgia	Glasgow
	Khubutia 28' (own goal)	Report		Stadium: Ibrox Stadium; Attendance: 34,719; Referee: Miroslav Zelinka (Czech Republic)

14 October 2014 Group D	Poland	2–2	Scotland	Warsaw
	Maczynski 11'; Milik 76'	Report	Maloney 18'; Naismith 57'	Stadium: National Stadium; Attendance: 55,197; Referee: Alberto Undiano Mallenco (Spain)

14 November 2014 Group D	Scotland	1–0	Republic of Ireland	Glasgow
	Maloney 74'	Report		Stadium: Celtic Park; Attendance: 59,239; Referee: Milorad Mazic (Serbia)

18 November 2014 Friendly	Scotland	1–3	England	Glasgow
	Robertson 83'		Oxlade-Chamberlain 32'; Rooney 47', 85'	Stadium: Celtic Park; Attendance: 49,526; Referee: Jonas Eriksson (Sweden)

25 March 2015 Friendly	Scotland	1–0	Northern Ireland	Glasgow
	Berra 85'	Report		Stadium: Hampden Park; Attendance: 20,117; Referee: Martin Atkinson (England)

29 March 2015 Group D	Scotland	6–1	Gibraltar	Glasgow
	Maloney 18' (pen.), 34' (pen.); Fletcher 29', 77', 90'; Naismith 39'	Report	Casciaro 19'	Stadium: Hampden Park; Attendance: 34,255; Referee: Mattias Gestranius (Finland)

5 June 2015 Friendly	Scotland	1–0	Qatar	Edinburgh
	Ritchie 41'	Report		Stadium: Easter Road; Attendance: 14,270; Referee: Sébastien Delferière (Belgium)

13 June 2015 Group D	Republic of Ireland	1–1	Scotland	Dublin
	Walters 38'	Report	O'Shea 47' (o.g.)	Stadium: Aviva Stadium; Referee: Nicola Rizzoli (Italy)

== Women's football ==
=== Scottish Women's Premier League ===
Pos	Team	Pld	W	D	L	GF	GA	GD	Pts	Qualification or relegation
1	Glasgow City (C, Q)	21	20	0	1	87	13	+74	60	2015–16 Champions League
2	Rangers	21	13	4	4	71	24	+47	43	
3	Hibernian	21	14	1	6	63	32	+31	43	
4	Spartans	21	12	2	7	60	30	+30	38	
5	Celtic	21	9	2	10	55	32	+23	29	
6	Aberdeen	21	6	3	12	41	44	−3	21	
7	Hamilton Academical	21	11	3	7	46	33	+13	36	
8	Inverness City	21	8	2	11	40	73	−33	26	
9	Hutchison Vale	21	6	6	9	21	57	−36	24	
10	Forfar Farmington	21	5	4	12	33	85	−52	19	
11	Queen's Park (R)	21	3	3	15	26	64	−38	12	Relegation to SWFL First Division
12	Buchan LFC (R)	21	4	0	17	30	94	−64	12	Relegation to SWFL First Division

Source: Scottish Women's FA
Rules for classification: 1) Points; 2) Goal difference; 3) Number of goals scored
(C) Champions; (Q) Qualified for the phase indicated; (R) Relegated

=== League and Cup honours ===
Division	Winner
2014 Scottish Women's Premier League	Glasgow City
SWFL First Division	Falkirk Ladies
SWFL Second Division North	Dee Vale
SWFL Second Division West/South West	Mill United
SWFL Second Division East/Central	East Fife
SWFL Second Division South East	Boroughmuir Thistle

Competition	Winner	Score	Runner-up	Match report
2014 Scottish Women's Cup	Glasgow City	5 – 0	Spartans	BBC Sport
2014 Scottish Women's Premier League Cup	Glasgow City	3 – 0	Hibernian	BBC Sport
SWFL First Division Cup	Hearts	3 – 1	Dunfermline Athletic	Hearts FC
SWFL Second Division Cup	Renfrew Ladies	9 – 3	Hamilton Caledonian	The Gazette

=== Individual honours ===
==== SWPL awards ====
Award	Winner	Team
Players' Player of the Year	Denise O'Sullivan	Glasgow City
Player of the Year	Kerry Montgomery	Spartans
Manager of the Year	Debbi McCulloch	Spartans
Young Player of the Year	Erin Cuthbert	Rangers

=== UEFA Women's Champions League ===
==== Glasgow City ====
===== Qualifying round =====
Group 4
Matches

9 August 2014 Qualifying round	Glasgow City (Scotland)	5–0	(Slovakia) Nové Zámky	Airdrie, Scotland
19:45	McCulloch 26'; McSorley 28' 90+4'; Lappin 32'; O'Sullivan 61'	Summary		Stadium: Excelsior Stadium; Attendance: 276; Referee: Florence Guillemin (France)

11 August 2014 Qualifying round	Glasgow City (Scotland)	1–0	(Northern Ireland) Glentoran Belfast United	Airdrie, Scotland
20:45	Whyte 40'	Report		Stadium: Excelsior Stadium; Attendance: 301; Referee: Barbara Bollenberg (Austria)

14 August 2014 Qualifying round	Zhytlobud Kharkiv (Ukraine)	0–4	(Scotland) Glasgow City	Airdrie, Scotland
17:00		Report	O'Sullivan 10', 63'; Love 18'; Brown 57'	Stadium: Excelsior Stadium; Attendance: 194; Referee: Florence Guillemin (France)

Standings
Pos	Team	Pld	W	D	L	GF	GA	GD	Pts	Qualification
1	(Scotland) Glasgow City (H)	3	3	0	0	10	0	+10	9	Advance to knockout phase
2	(Ukraine) Zhytlobud Kharkiv	3	2	0	1	8	5	+3	6	
3	(Northern Ireland) Glentoran Belfast United	3	1	0	2	5	8	−3	3	
4	(Slovakia) Nové Zámky	3	0	0	3	3	13	−10	0	

Source: UEFA
Rules for classification: Group stage tiebreakers
(H) Hosts

===== Knockout Phase =====
8 October 2014 Round of 32	Medyk Konin (Poland)	2–0	(Scotland) Glasgow City	Konin, Poland
15:30	Pajor 53'; Sikora 64'	Report		Stadium: Miejski Im. Zkotej Jedenastki; Attendance: 3,000; Referee: Sandra Bastos (Portugal)

15 October 2014 Round of 32	Glasgow City (Scotland)	3–0 (a.e.t.) (3–2 agg.)	(Poland) Medyk Konin	Airdrie, Scotland
20:30	Love 59'; Fairlie 77'; O'Sullivan 94'	Report		Stadium: Excelsior Stadium; Attendance: 775; Referee: Anastasia Pustovoitova (Russia)

9 November 2014 Round of 16	Zürich (Switzerland)	2–1	(Scotland) Glasgow City	Zürich, Switzerland
17:00	Humm 10'; Stierli 59'	Report	Brown 52'	Stadium: Letzigrund; Attendance: 1,658; Referee: Stéphanie Frappart (France)

12 November 2014 Round of 16	Glasgow City (Scotland)	4–2 (5–4 agg.)	(Switzerland) Zürich	Airdrie, Scotland
20:30	Grant 55'; Ross 64' (pen.); Love 81'; Lappin 87'	Report	Zehnder 45'; Humm 66'	Stadium: Excelsior Stadium; Attendance: 698; Referee: Pernilla Larsson (Sweden)

22 March 2015 Quarter-finals	Glasgow City (Scotland)	0–2	(France) Paris Saint-Germain	Airdrie, Scotland
17:05		Report	Lahmari 19'; Hamraoui 53'	Stadium: Excelsior Stadium; Attendance: 1,785; Referee: Riem Hussein (Germany)

28 March 2015 Quarter-finals	Paris Saint-Germain (France)	5–0 (7–0 agg.)	(Scotland) Glasgow City	Paris, France
19:00	Lappin 26' (o.g.); Delie 54', 68'; Delannoy 65' (pen.); Dali 87' (pen.)	Report		Stadium: Parc des Princes; Attendance: 11,318; Referee: Gyöngyi Gaál (Hungary)

=== Scotland women's national team ===
3 August 2014 Friendly	Scotland	1–1	Wales	Dumfries
13:00	Corsie 74'	Report	Wiltshire 58'	Stadium: Palmerston Park

20 August 2014 Friendly	Portugal	1–1	Scotland	Viana do Castelo
18:00	Silva 90' (penalty kick)	Report	Corsie	Stadium: Estádio Dr. José de Matos

13 September 2014 Group 4	Scotland	9–0	Faroe Islands	Motherwell
	Little 6'; Weir 10'; Ross 11', 46', 52'; Corsie 57', 80'; Crichton 59'; Beattie 90'	Report		Stadium: Fir Park

17 September 2014 Group 4	Sweden	2–0	Scotland	Gothenburg
	Sjögran 7'; Schelin 76'	Report		Stadium: Gamla Ullevi

25 October 2014 Play-offs	Scotland	1–2	Netherlands	Edinburgh
17:30	Little 49' (pen.)	Report	Martens 10'; Melis 23' (pen.)	Stadium: Tynecastle Stadium; Referee: (Ukraine) Kateryna Monzul

30 October 2014 Play-offs	Netherlands	2–0 (4–1 agg.)	Scotland	Rotterdam
18:00	Martens 51'; Melis 77'	Report		Stadium: Sparta Stadion; Referee: (Switzerland) Esther Staubli

8 February 2015 Friendly	Northern Ireland	0–4	Scotland	Solitude, Belfast
13:30 (GMT)		Scottish FA	25', 68' Jane Ross; 27', 48' Caroline Weir

4 March 2015 2015 Cyprus Cup	Scotland	0–2	Canada	GSP Stadium, Nicosia
17:30		Scottish FA	2' Jessie Fleming; 53' Christine Sinclair

6 March 2015 2015 Cyprus Cup	Italy	3–2	Scotland	GSZ Stadium, Larnaca
17:30	Cristiana Girelli 18', 67'; Stefania Tarenzi 90'	Scottish FA	69' Emma Mitchell; 80' Kim Little

9 March 2015 2015 Cyprus Cup	Scotland	2–1	South Korea	GSZ Stadium, Larnaca
14:30	Kim Little 17' (pen.); Christie Murray 89'	Scottish FA	34' Yeo Min-ji

11 March 2015 2015 Cyprus Cup	Netherlands	1–3	Scotland	Ammochostos Stadium, Larnaca
13:00	Anouk Hoogendijk 72'	Scottish FA	16', 54', 90+2' Kim Little

9 April 2015 Challenge match	Scotland	1–1	Australia	Falkirk Stadium, Falkirk
14:30	Jane Ross 59'	Scottish FA	Laura Alleway

28 May 2015 Challenge match	France	1–0	Scotland	Stade Marcel Picot, Nancy
20:00	Delie	BBC Sport

== Deaths ==
- 4 July: Andy Jardine, 78, Dumbarton fullback.
- 11 July: Jim Geddes, 84, Motherwell defender and midfielder.
- 21 July: Stewart Hillis, 70, Scotland national team doctor.
- 22 July: Morris Stevenson, 71, Motherwell, Hibernian, Morton, Dundee United and Berwick Rangers inside forward.
- 28 July: Alex Forbes, 89, Scotland wing half.
- 17 August: Sammy Conn, 52, Falkirk, Albion Rovers, Clydebank, Airdrieonians and Cowdenbeath midfielder and Cowdenbeath manager.
- 27 August: Bobby Kinloch, 79, Hibernian, Greenock Morton, Berwick Rangers, Raith Rovers and Dunfermline Athletic player.
- 4 September: Willie Finlay, 88, East Fife, Clyde and Raith Rovers defender.
- 21 September: Tim Whalen, 83, Dumbarton forward.
- 22 September: Billy Neil, 75, Airdrieonians and Queen's Park defender.
- 23 September: John Divers, 74, Celtic and Partick Thistle forward.
- 30 September: Hugh Doherty, 93, Celtic winger.
- 25 October: Gerry Burrell, 90, St Mirren and Dundee winger.
- 26 October: Jim Sharkey, 80, Celtic, Airdrieonians and Raith Rovers forward.
- 29 October: Archie Murphy, 81, Alloa Athletic wing-half.
- November: Alex Bain, 78, Motherwell and Falkirk centre forward
- 8 November: Sammy Wilson, 82, St Mirren and Celtic inside forward.
- 9 November: Sammy Reid, 75, Motherwell, Falkirk, Clyde, Berwick Rangers and Dumbarton inside forward.
- 13 November: Jim Storrie, 74, Airdrie, Aberdeen and St Mirren centre forward; St Johnstone manager.
- 26 November: Arthur Montford, 85, Scotsport commentator.
- 1 December: Jimmy Duncan, 83, Celtic, St Mirren, Albion Rovers, Dundee United and Stranraer winger.
- 7 December: Tommy Todd, 88, Hamilton Academical inside forward.
- 7 December: Tom Mealyou, Berwick Rangers goalkeeper.
- 12 December: John Baxter, 78, Hibernian, Falkirk and Clydebank wing half.
- 19 December: Pat Holton, 78, Hamilton, Motherwell and St Johnstone full back.
- 31 December: Jimmy Dunn, 91, Wolves and Derby County forward.
- 4 January: John McPhee, 77, Motherwell defender.
- 14 January: Danny Malloy, 84, Dundee and Clyde defender.
- 21 January: Douglas Cromb, 84, Hibernian chairman.
- 29 January: Derek Robertson, 65, St Johnstone goalkeeper.
- 8 February: Nick Sharkey, 71, Sunderland forward.
- 10 February: Tom McQueen, 85, Leith Athletic, Alloa, Hibs, East Fife, Berwick Rangers and Stranraer goalkeeper.
- 23 February: Andy King, 72, Kilmarnock defender.
- 1 March: Stuart McGrady, 29, Ayr United and Queen's Park striker.
- 2 March: Dave Mackay, 80, Hearts and Scotland wing half.
- 20 March: Eddie Mulheron, 72, Clyde defender.
- 5 April: Turnbull Hutton, 68, Raith Rovers chairman.
- 16 April: Tommy Preston, 82, Hibernian forward.
- 29 April: Gary Liddell, 60, Hearts forward.
- 11 May: John Hewie, 87, Scotland defender.
- 13 May: Eric Bakie, 87, Aberdeen, Dunfermline and St Johnstone wing half.
- 19 May: Joe Carr, 83, St Johnstone and Dumbarton winger.
- 21 May: Ernie Hannigan, 72, Queen of the South and Morton winger.
- 4 June: Jørgen Ravn, 75, Aberdeen forward.
- 6 June: Colin Jackson, 68, Rangers, Morton, Partick Thistle and Scotland defender.
- 7 June: Stephen Gove, 55, Brechin City forward.
