= Adamets =

Adamets (Russian: Адаме́ц) is a Slavic last name derived from the given name Adam

Notable people with the last name include:

- Danylo Adamets, Chairman of Executive Committee of Donetsk Oblast, Ukrainian SSR, in 1954–1956
- Nikolay Adamets (1983–2014), Belarusian association football player
