= Al-Ittihad Club =

Al-Ittihad Club may refer to:

- Al Ittihad Club (Salalah), an Omani sports club based in Salalah, Oman
- Al-Ittihad Club (Jeddah), a Saudi Premier League football club based in Jeddah
- Al-Ittihad Club (women), a Saudi professional women's football club based in Jeddah
- Al-Ittihad Club (Nablus), a Palestinian football club based in Nablus
- Al-Ittihad SC (Tripoli), a Libyan football club based in Bab Ben Gashier, Tripoli, Libya
