= 2008–09 West Bank Premier League =

West Bank Premier League
- Season: 2008–09
- Champions: Tarji Wadi Al-Nes
- Relegated: Al-Arabi; Ittihad Nablus

The West Bank Premier League 2008–09 season was won by Wadi Al-Nes while Al-Arabi and Ittihad Nablus were relegated. The top ten teams qualified for Division A, while the next ten teams qualified for Division B.

After the regular season a tie on points for 10th place was decided in a one leg play-off. Shabab Al-Khalil won the match against Markaz Askar by 2–1.

== Final league table ==
Pos	Team	Pld	W	D	L	GF	GA	GD	Pts	Qualification or relegation
1	Tarji Wadi Al-Nes (C)	21	15	4	2	46	10	+36	49	Division A
2	Markaz Shabab Al-Am'ari	21	15	3	3	49	14	+35	48	Division A
3	Jabal Al-Mukaber	21	12	6	3	56	20	+36	42	Division A
4	Markaz Tulkarem	21	12	6	3	48	23	+25	42	Division A
5	Al-Birah	21	12	2	7	44	22	+22	38	Division A
6	Al-Dhahriah	21	10	6	5	33	20	+13	36	Division A
7	Al-Khedher	21	11	3	7	29	26	+3	36	Division A
8	Thaqafi Tulkarem	21	10	5	6	38	29	+9	35	Division A
9	Hilal Al-Quds (Jerusalem)	21	9	7	5	36	21	+15	34	Division A
10	Shabab Al-Khaleel	21	9	5	7	26	21	+5	32	Division A
11	Markaz Askar	21	9	5	7	32	26	+6	32	Division B
12	Hilal Areeha	21	8	4	9	40	34	+6	28	Division B
13	Markaz Balata	21	7	7	7	21	19	+2	28	Division B
14	Ahli Al-Khaleel	21	7	7	7	27	35	−8	28	Division B
15	Shabab Yatta	21	7	4	10	32	35	−3	25	Division B
16	Silwan	21	6	4	11	30	28	+2	22	Division B
17	Islamy Bethlehem	21	6	4	11	21	43	−22	22	Division B
18	Abu Dees	21	5	4	12	25	49	−24	19	Division B
19	Sur Baher	21	4	6	11	18	43	−25	18	Division B
20	Jenin Sport Club	21	4	2	15	19	46	−27	14	Division B
21	Al-Arabi	21	2	2	17	22	57	−35	8	Relegation to Second Division
22	Ittihad Nablus	21	2	2	17	17	91	−74	8	Relegation to Second Division

(C) Champions
