= 2014–15 North Superleague =

PMAC Group Superleague
- Season: 2014–15
- Matches: 182
- Goals: 729 (4.01 per match)

The 2014–15 North Superleague is the fourteenth staging of the North Superleague, the highest tier of league competition in the North Region of the Scottish Junior Football Association. The season began on 5 August 2014. The winners of this competition are eligible to enter the 2015–16 Scottish Cup.

Hermes won the league title on 25 April 2015.

== Member clubs for the 2014–15 season ==
Culter were the reigning champions.

Cruden Bay and Inverness City were promoted from the North First Division (East) and (West) respectively and replace the relegated East End and Longside.

Club	Location	Ground	Manager	Finishing position 2013–14
Banchory St. Ternan	Crathes	Milton Park	Sandy Carrol	11th
Banks O' Dee	Aberdeen	Spain Park	Doug Baxter	2nd
Cruden Bay	Cruden Bay	Watson Park		North First Division (East), 1st
Culter	Peterculter	Crombie Park	Hugh Robertson & Duncan Ord	Champions
Deveronside	Banff	Canal Park	Rob Scott & Craig Ewen	6th
Dyce Juniors	Dyce	Ian Mair Park	Andy Robb	3rd
Ellon United	Ellon	The Meadows	Bruce Morrison	10th
Hall Russell United	Bridge of Don	Denmore Park	John Carroll	9th
Hermes	Bridge of Don	Uniconn Park	Neil Dawson	4th
Inverness City	Inverness	Lister Park	Jordan MacDonald	North First Division (West), 1st
New Elgin	Elgin	Nicol-Togneri Park		8th
Maud	Maud	Maud Pleasure Park	Allan Hale	5th
Stonehaven	Stonehaven	Glenury Park	Ian Esslemont	7th
FC Stoneywood	Aberdeen	Market Street		12th

== League table ==
Pos	Team	Pld	W	D	L	GF	GA	GD	Pts	Qualification or relegation
1	Hermes (C)	26	22	2	2	74	16	+58	68	Qualification for 2015–16 Scottish Cup
2	Maud	26	18	4	4	90	46	+44	58	
3	Banks O' Dee	26	17	5	4	84	27	+57	56	
4	Culter	26	16	4	6	67	42	+25	52	
5	Deveronside	26	13	4	9	50	49	+1	43	
6	FC Stoneywood	26	11	3	12	49	53	−4	36	
7	Inverness City	26	10	6	10	46	57	−11	36	
8	Dyce Juniors	26	10	4	12	50	57	−7	34	
9	Stonehaven	26	9	6	11	52	53	−1	33	
10	Banchory St. Ternan	26	11	2	13	50	59	−9	27 (Note: Banchory St. Ternan were deducted eight points for fielding an ineligible player.)	
11	Hall Russell United	26	5	6	15	35	49	−14	21	
12	Ellon United	26	5	3	18	32	64	−32	18	
13	Cruden Bay (R)	26	3	5	18	23	64	−41	14	Relegation to North First Division
14	New Elgin (R)	26	3	4	19	27	93	−66	13	Relegation to North First Division

Updated to match(es) played on 2 June 2015. Source: North Region JFA
Rules for classification: 1) points; 2) goal difference; 3) number of goals scored.
(C) Champions; (R) Relegated

== Results ==
Home \ Away	BST	BOD	CRU	CUL	DVS	DYC	ELL	HRU	HER	IVC	MAU	NELG	SHV	STWD
Banchory St. Ternan		2–0	2–0	1–2	3–1	3–4	2–0	3–1	2–3	0–3	3–4	5–2	2–1	2–1
Banks O' Dee	5–0		8–0	2–2	2–1	1–2	3–1	3–2	3–0	5–0	4–0	13–0	1–0	5–1
Cruden Bay	1–3	1–1		0–2	1–0	0–2	3–1	0–3	0–3	1–3	0–1	0–2	0–4	1–3
Culter	6–1	2–2	3–1		3–2	8–2	3–1	2–1	0–2	2–3	1–3	3–0	3–3	1–3
Deveronside	5–0	1–1	2–1	2–1		2–0	5–1	2–2	0–5	2–0	0–4	3–0	2–0	3–1
Dyce Juniors	2–1	1–4	0–0	0–3	1–4		2–0	1–1	0–4	6–2	4–4	5–1	0–1	0–2
Ellon United	1–1	1–4	2–3	1–2	4–2	1–6		1–2	0–3	0–1	2–4	3–3	0–1	0–3
Hall Russell United	2–2	1–2	2–0	1–2	0–2	1–2	1–2		0–1	0–1	1–7	3–1	0–1	2–2
Hermes	3–2	2–1	3–1	0–1	7–1	0–0	5–0	3–1		4–1	2–1	6–0	5–0	1–0
Inverness City	1–4	1–2	4–1	2–2	1–1	0–6	2–2	2–1	0–1		2–2	2–1	2–2	2–1
Maud	3–0	3–2	3–3	4–1	2–3	7–4	0–1	2–1	1–1	3–2		7–0	4–1	6–2
New Elgin	2–3	0–6	2–0	1–5	1–1	2–0	0–4	1–2	0–3	1–1	2–6		2–2	2–5
Stonehaven	3–2	1–1	3–3	3–4	7–1	4–0	1–2	3–3	0–4	5–3	3–5	1–0		1–2
FC Stoneywood	3–1	2–3	2–2	1–3	1–2	1–0	2–1	1–1	1–3	2–5	1–4	4–1	2–1	

Updated to match(es) played on 2 June 2015. Source: North Region JFA
Legend: Blue = home team win; Yellow = draw; Red = away team win.
