= Seriki Audu =

Nigerian footballer (1991–2014)

Personal information
- Full name: Seriki Audu
- Date of birth: 30 August 1991
- Place of birth: Nigeria
- Date of death: 20 December 2014 (aged 23)
- Position: Striker

Senior career*
Years	Team	Apps	(Gls)
2010–11	Lobi Stars F.C.		
2012	Lobi Stars F.C.		
2013	Gombe United F.C.		
201?	Lobi Stars F.C.		
- * Club domestic league appearances and goals

Seriki "Sarki" Audu (30 August 1991 – 20 December 2014) was a Nigerian footballer. He played for Gombe United and Lobi Stars in the Nigeria Premier League. He was killed in a car crash on 20 December 2014 at the age of 23.
