= Mario Pietruzzi =

Italian footballer and manager

Personal information
- Date of birth: 16 June 1918
- Place of birth: Alessandria, Italy
- Date of death: 5 November 2014 (aged 96)
- Positions: Midfielder; forward

Youth career
- Savoia 1920 Litta Parodi
- Crema

Senior career*
Years	Team	Apps	(Gls)
1938–1953	Alessandria	283	(24)

Managerial career
- 1955–1962: Derthona
- 1964–1967: Valenzana
- 1967–1969: Alessandria
- 1972: Alessandria
- 1974: Alessandria
- * Club domestic league appearances and goals as of 5 March 2010

Mario Pietruzzi (16 June 1918 – 5 November 2014) was an Italian professional footballer and manager.

== Career ==
=== Footballer ===
As a footballer, he played for all of his career with Alessandria. He became the third player to play most matches with the team.

He gained a promotion in Serie A in 1945–46, winning a Serie B championship, and a promotion in Serie B in 1953.

=== Coach ===
As a coach, he managed Derthona and Valenzana. He managed even Alessandria for two seasons and, in the 1970s, he signed twice as a caretaker.
