= Viktor Kopyl =

Ukrainian footballer

Personal information
- Date of birth: 10 July 1960
- Place of birth: Ovadne, Volyn Oblast, Ukrainian SSR
- Date of death: 8 August 2014 (aged 54)
- Place of death: Volodymyr-Volynskyi, Volyn Oblast, Ukraine
- Height: 1.82 m (5 ft 11 1/2 in)
- Position: Defender

Senior career*
Years	Team	Apps	(Gls)
1978–1979	Torpedo Lutsk	35	(0)
1980	Kryvbas Kryvyi Rih	39	(0)
1981	Karpaty Lviv	32	(2)
1982	Nistru Kishinev	1	(0)
1982–1983	SKA Karpaty Lviv	42	(1)
1984	Kolos Nikopol	13	(0)
1984	Torpedo Lutsk	7	(1)
1985–1988	Kryvbas Kryvyi Rih	153	(4)
1989	Kremin Kremenchuk	30	(2)
1989	Sudostroitel Mykolaiv	6	(0)
1990	Kremin Kremenchuk	7	(0)
1990	Kryvbas Kryvyi Rih	7	(0)
1991	Kauchuk Sterlitamak	36	(1)
1992	Artania Ochakiv	15	(1)
- * Club domestic league appearances and goals

Viktor Kopyl (10 July 1960 – 8 August 2014) was a Ukrainian footballer. He most notably played for Karpaty Lviv and Volyn Lutsk.
