= Moses Otolorin =

Nigerian footballer

Personal information
- Full name: Moses Otolorin
- Date of birth: c. 1947
- Place of birth: Nigeria
- Date of death: 22 December 2014 (aged 67)
- Place of death: Ilorin, Kwara State, Nigeria
- Positions: Defender; midfielder

Senior career*
Years	Team	Apps	(Gls)
?	IICC Shooting Stars of Ibadan		
- * Club domestic league appearances and goals

Moses Otolorin (c. 1947 – 22 December 2014) was a Nigerian footballer. He played for IICC Shooting Stars of Ibadan in the Nigeria Premier League. He was a member of the squad that won the African Cup Winners' Cup in 1976. Otolorin died of cancer on 22 December 2014. He was 67.
