= Wimper Guerrero =

Ecuadorian footballer (1982-2014)

Wimper Orlando Guerrero Reasco (7 February 1982 – 3 August 2014) was an Ecuadorian football midfielder.

== Club career ==
Born in Babahoyo, Ecuador, Guerrero played for eight clubs, the final being Club Deportivo Venice.

== Death ==
Guerrero died in Babahoyo in August 2014 after suffering a heart attack.
