= José María Lorant =

Argentine footballer and coach

Personal information
- Date of birth: 21 August 1955
- Date of death: 12 December 2014 (aged 59)
- Position: Midfielder

Senior career*
| Years | Team | Apps | (Gls) |
| 1977 | Argentino de Rosario | | |
| 1978–1982 | Sarmiento | | |
| 1982 | Emelec | | |
| 1983 | Temperley | | |
| 1984 | Newell's Old Boys | | |
| 1985 | Tigre | | |
| 1986 | Argentino de Merlo | | |
- * Club domestic league appearances and goals

José María Lorant (21 August 1955 – 12 December 2014) was an Argentine football player and coach.

== Career ==
Lorant played for Argentino de Rosario, Sarmiento, Emelec, Temperley, Newell's Old Boys, Tigre and Argentino de Merlo. He also managed a number of Argentine club sides.
