= Eddie Mulheron =

Scottish footballer

Personal information
- Full name: Edward Mulheron
- Date of birth: 3 May 1942
- Place of birth: Scotland
- Date of death: 20 March 2015 (aged 72)
- Position: Defender

Youth career
- Benburb

Senior career*
Years	Team	Apps	(Gls)
1963–1972	Clyde	196	(2)
1972–197?	Durban United		
Total		196	(2)
- * Club domestic league appearances and goals

Edward "Eddie" Mulheron (3 May 1942 – 20 March 2015) was a Scottish association football defender.

Mulheron signed for Clyde, his first and only senior Scottish club, in 1963. He went on to make 249 appearances in all competitions, scoring just 2 goals. He was the captain of Clyde for several seasons, and a firm favourite with the fans. He left Clyde and Scotland in 1972, to join Durban United in South Africa.
