= Roy Law =

English footballer (1937–2014)

Roy (Royston) Law (29 September 1937 — 10 October 2014) was a Great Britain and England Amateur International centre-half footballer and player for Wimbledon FC as an Amateur and Professional. The record for most appearances for Wimbledon is held by Roy Law, who turned out for the club 644 times between 1958 and 1972. Law's 433 league appearances was also a record. He served as captain of Wimbledon and the England Amateur team for much of his career.

== Family and early years ==
Roy Law was born in Croydon, South London. He left school at 15, joining Crystal Palace Football Club as a member of the groundstaff, with a view to a playing career. He broke his leg soon after joining, and was sacked shortly afterwards. He then did a plumbing apprenticeship and served British Army National Service. On discharge, he went for a trial for Wimbledon FC, and in 1958 was signed up.

== Football debut and Amateur years ==
Roy Law's first game for Wimbledon was during the 1958–59 season, their 5 -4 victory over Woking. He notably led the team to their FA Amateur Cup victory against Sutton United in 1963. He led the team through what was to become a period of unprecedented success, and in 2013 was voted the second best captain in Wimbledon history, after Dave Beasant.

== International honours ==
He captained England Amateurs and formed a key part of England's central defence in the early 1960s, alongside fellow Don John Martin

== Professional career ==
The proposal to turn Wimbledon FC professional and join the Division One of the Southern League was controversial, and Roy Law as captain, was instrumental in keeping the players and club united. Despite signing a professional contract on 10 June 1964, Roy continued with a day job as a builder throughout his remaining playing career.

He remained captain until leaving the club in 1972, having served as captain for 13 years.

== Later life ==
After leaving Wimbledon FC in 1972 Roy worked as a salesman, and part-time college lecturer. He later returning to the building trade, running his own small business. He became a staunch supporter of AFC Wimbledon following the club's formation in the wake of the destruction of Wimbledon FC. Along with Lawrie Sanchez and Dave Beasant he was selected to receive historical memorabilia handed over by MK Dons to Merton Council.

He has been voted by fans as the second best captain in the club's history, after Dave Beasant, who led the team to FA Cup glory.

Roy Law died on 10 October 2014.
