= Henning Elting =

Danish footballer (1925-2014)

Personal information
- Date of birth: 26 October 1925
- Place of birth: Nykøbing Falster, Denmark
- Date of death: 8 May 2014 (aged 88)
- Position: Goalkeeper

International career
Years	Team	Apps	(Gls)
1949–1950	Denmark	4	(0)

Henning Elting (26 October 1925 – 8 May 2014) was a Danish footballer. He played in four matches for the Denmark national football team from 1949 to 1950.
