= Stelio Nardin =

Italian footballer (1939–2014)

Personal information
- Date of birth: 26 August 1939
- Place of birth: Romans d'Isonzo, Italy
- Date of death: 11 August 2014 (aged 74)
- Place of death: Cervignano del Friuli, Italy
- Position: Defender

Senior career*
Years	Team	Apps	(Gls)
1960–65	Catanzaro 1929	98	(0)
1965–71	Napoli	135	(0)
1971–72	Casertana Calcio	14	(0)

International career^{‡}
1967	Italy	1	(0)
- * Club domestic league appearances and goals as of 12 August 2014 ‡ National team caps and goals as of 12 August 2014

Stelio Nardin (Italian pronunciation: [ˈstɛːljo narˈdin]; 26 August 1939 – 11 August 2014) was an Italian footballer who played as a defender.

== Club career ==
Nardin is best known for his time with Napoli where he made 135 appearances; he also played for U.S. Catanzaro 1929 and Casertana Calcio.

== International career ==
Nardin won one international cap for Italy in a 1–1 draw against Portugal in a friendly held on 27 March 1967.
