= Amos Mkhari =

South African soccer player

Amos Mkhari (born in Ga-Rankuwa – died 7 October 2014 in Tshwane) was a South African footballer commonly known as "Heel Extension" or "Shuffle".

== Biography ==
Mkhari's debuted professionally in 1974 with the Witbank Spurs F.C., who he played with for four years. In 1978, he began playing for the Orlando Pirates F.C., who he played with for eight years. In 1980, he was part of the team that won the Nedbank Cup.
