= Carlos Alberto Etcheverry =

Argentine footballer and coach

Personal information
- Date of birth: 29 June 1933
- Place of birth: Buenos Aires,
- Position: Striker

Senior career*
Years	Team	Apps	(Gls)
1952–1955	Boca Juniors	24	(11)
1955–1957	Chacarita	17	(4)
1958–1961	León	?	(?)
1961–1962	Irapuato	?	(?)
1963–1964	UNAM Pumas	26	(20)
1965–1966	Atlante	?	(?)
1966–1969	Jabatos	?	(?)
- * Club domestic league appearances and goals

Carlos Alberto "Tito" Etcheverry D'Angelo (June 29, 1933 in Buenos Aires – August 28, 2014) was an Argentine soccer player and coach, who is most known in Mexico for being the first top-scorer of the Pumas de la UNAM.

== Biography ==
Etcheverry was born in the Barrio de La Paternal, in Buenos Aires, Argentina. When was 17, he debuted as a professional, playing for Boca Juniors. After several seasons, he was transferred to Chacarita Juniors. In 1957, he was hired by the Mexican León, recommended by his brother-in-law and also a soccer player, Oscar Nova.

In 1964, Etcheverry became the first top-goalscorer of the Pumas de la UNAM, with 20 goals.

Besides León and UNAM, "Tito" Etcheverry also played in Mexico for Club Irapuato, Atlante F.C., and Jabatos de Nuevo León, where he served as player-manager. He later went on to become manager of CF Monterrey.

Etcheverry died due to complications related to his battle with diabetes, in Leon, on August 28, 2014.
