= Derek Robertson (footballer) =

Scottish footballer

Derek Robertson (12 February 1949 – 29 January 2015) was a Scottish footballer who played as a goalkeeper and played his entire senior career with St Johnstone.

The Glasgow-born Robertson joined St Johnstone in 1966 from junior outfit Petershill and made 235 appearances for the Muirton Park club before finally retiring in 1979.

== Death ==
Robertson died, aged 65, on 29 January 2015 from a respiratory infection while battling cancer.
