= Stuart McGrady =

Scottish footballer

Personal information
- Full name: Stuart Ian McGrady
- Date of birth: 8 April 1985
- Place of birth: Irvine, Scotland
- Date of death: 1 March 2015 (aged 29)
- Place of death: Ayr, Scotland
- Position: Forward

Senior career*
Years	Team	Apps	(Gls)
2003–2005	Ayr United	45	(0)
2005–2007	Cumnock Juniors		
2007–2009	Queen's Park	36	(2)
2009–2015	Maybole		
Total		81	(2)
- * Club domestic league appearances and goals

Stuart Ian McGrady (8 April 1985 – 1 March 2015) was a Scottish professional footballer who played as a forward for Ayr United, Cumnock Juniors, Queen's Park and Maybole.
