= Anatoly Chertkov =

Russian footballer

Anatoly Chertkov (Russian: Анато́лий Его́рович Чертко́в; 17 July 1936 in Tula Oblast – 22 October 2014 in Rostov-on-Don) was a Russian midfield footballer. He was a Master of Sports of the USSR.

== Biography ==
He debuted professionally in 1958 with the FC SKVO Rostov-on-Don, playing in the Soviet First League. He played with them for nine seasons, scoring 16 goals in 286 matches. He transferred to FC Rostov for a final season, retiring in 1968.
