= List of football clubs in Palestine =

Following is a list of football clubs located in Palestine, sorted alphabetically.

== West Bank ==
- Ahli Qalqilyah
- Hilal Al-Makdesi
- Hilal Al-Quds
- Hilal Areeha
- Ittihad Nablus
- Jabal Al-Mukaber Club
- Markaz Balata
- Markaz Shabab Al-Am'ari
- Markaz Shabab Askar
- Markaz Tulkarem
- Shabab Al-Bireh
- Shabab Al-Khaleel
- Shabab Al-Dhahrieh
- Surif Club
- Tarji Wadi Al-Nes
- Thaqafi Tulkarem
- Wadi Al-Neiss

== Gaza ==
- Al-Ahli Gaza
- Al-Shejaia
- Khidmat Al-Shatia
- Khidmat Jabalia
- Khidmat Khan Younes
- Al-Hilal Gaza
- Al-Qadisiya
- Al-Sadaqah
- Shabab Rafah
- Al-Ahli Bait Hanoun
- Gaza Sports Club
- Khidmat Al-Nosirat
- Khidmat Rafah
- Shabab Jabalia
- Rajaa Ghaza
