= Nikolay Adamets =

Belarusian footballer

Personal information
- Date of birth: 18 October 1983
- Place of birth: Mikashevichi, Belarusian SSR
- Date of death: 7 September 2014 (aged 30)
- Place of death: Luninets, Belarus
- Height: 1.91 m (6 ft 3 in)
- Position: Goalkeeper

Youth career
- Granit Mikashevichi

Senior career*
Years	Team	Apps	(Gls)
2000–2001	Granit Mikashevichi	16	(0)
2002–2004	Slavia Mozyr	0	(0)
2005–2007	Granit Mikashevichi	33	(0)
2008–2009	Minsk	26	(0)
2010–2013	Granit Mikashevichi	26	(0)
2014	Volna Pinsk	9	(0)
- * Club domestic league appearances and goals as of 7 September 2014

Nikolay Adamets (Belarusian: Мiкалай Адамец; Russian: Николай Адамец; 18 October 1983 – 7 September 2014) was a Belarusian footballer who last played for Volna Pinsk. He died on 7 September 2014 after being hospitalized three days earlier with a cerebral haemorrhage.
