= Jimmy Duncan (footballer, born 1930) =

Scottish footballer

Personal information
- Full name: James Burness Duncan
- Date of birth: 10 December 1930
- Place of birth: Cathcart, Glasgow, Scotland
- Date of death: 1 December 2014 (aged 83)
- Place of death: Rutherglen, Scotland
- Height: 5 ft 9 in (1.75 m)
- Position: Outside left

Senior career*
Years	Team	Apps	(Gls)
–1951	Baillieston Juniors		
1951–1955	Celtic	8	(2)
1955–1957	St Mirren	2	(0)
1957–1958	Dundee United	11	(0)
1958–1960	Albion Rovers	64	(13)
1960–1961	Stranraer	1	(0)
Total		86	(16)
- * Club domestic league appearances and goals

James Burness Duncan (10 December 1930 – 1 December 2014) was a Scottish footballer who played as an outside left.

Duncan started his senior career with Celtic having been signed from Baillieston Juniors and scored on his debut against St Mirren on 1 November 1952, at age 22. He went on to make nine appearances for the Celtic Park club (contributing six appearances and one goal – an equaliser in an Old Firm derby – to the 1953–54 Scottish Division A title, the first championship since the 1930s) before being released in 1955. He also played for St Mirren (barely featuring in two seasons), Dundee United, Albion Rovers and Stranraer.
