= Hugh Doherty (footballer) =

Irish footballer (1921–2014)

Hugh Doherty (5 May 1921 – 29 September 2014) was an Irish footballer who played on the right wing.

== Career ==
Doherty, who began his career with Dundalk, made a handful of appearances for Celtic in the 1946–47 season, at the end of which he was released and was immediately signed up by Blackpool, just as they had also signed Stanley Matthews. Before making any League appearances, he was injured during the Tangerines' 1947–48 campaign, seriously enough so, Blackpool thought, that he was ultimately paid off and had his contract cancelled. He returned to Glasgow, where he trained with Clyde, before being signed by Raith Rovers. His knee gave way during his comeback game, after which he decided his professional career was over and returned to his birthplace of County Donegal.

He was able to continue at amateur level, turning out for Buncrana Hearts, a team he had co-founded in 1944.

He was also involved in the development of the Inishowen League, Ulster Senior League and Ulster Football Association. At the age of 93 he was still active as assistant treasurer of the Inishowen Football League. In 2012, he was honoured by the Ulster Football Association in appreciation for services to football. In 2013, he was the recipient of the FAI's John Sherlock Services to Football Award and in February 2013, he was presented with the Donegal Sports Star Hall of Fame Award by FAI Chief Executive, John Delaney.

When making his debut for Dundalk at Milltown against Shamrock Rovers, part of a wall collapsed on children standing on the sidelines of the pitch. As Hugh was nearby he pulled a child out from under the debris and carried him off the pitch. The following week he received a standing ovation from the Dundalk crowd as his picture, with the blood stained shirt, had appeared in the national newspapers unknown to himself.

== Personal life ==
Doherty was married to Eithne, a Dubliner, until her death in 2006. They had five children: Anthony and Ann-Marie, who pre-deceased their parents, and Deirdre, Denis and Eamon. He also had four grandchildren. He lived independently until the final few weeks of his life.

== Death ==
Doherty died on 29 September 2014 at the age of 93. He was the oldest living Celtic player at the time of his death.
