= 2015 in the United Kingdom =

Events from the year 2015 in the United Kingdom.

== Incumbents ==
- Monarch – Elizabeth II
- Prime Minister – David Cameron (Coalition until 8 May; Conservative starting 8 May)

== Events ==
=== January ===
- 2 January – Buckingham Palace denies "any suggestion of impropriety with underage minors" by Prince Andrew, Duke of York, after he was named in U.S. court documents related to a lawsuit against convicted sex offender, American financier Jeffrey Epstein.
- 3 January – Eight people are reported missing after a cargo vessel, the Cemfjord, capsizes in the Pentland Firth, Scotland.
- 4 January – The Höegh Osaka, a Singaporean cargo ship transporting luxury cars, runs aground near the Isle of Wight after it started listing shortly after leaving the Port of Southampton. An investigation is launched.
- 6 January
  - Figures from the last three months show that England's hospital Accident & Emergency waiting time performance has dropped to its worst levels for a decade.
  - Comedian and actor Stephen Fry confirms he is to marry his partner, Elliott Spencer. The couple are married two weeks later at a registry office in Norfolk.
- 7 January – The SMMT announce that car sales surged in 2014 with 2.47 million new cars registered; a 9% increase from 2013 and the best annual performance since 2004.
- 9 January
  - Hurricane-force winds cause travel disruption and leave tens of thousands of homes without power across Scotland.
  - Circle Holdings, the first private company to operate an NHS hospital, announces plans to withdraw from its contract to run Hinchingbrooke Hospital because it believes the franchise is "no longer viable under current terms".
  - Chancellor George Osborne says that tackling terrorism is a "national priority" and security services will get all of the resources they need in light of the recent Charlie Hebdo attacks in Paris, and the MI5 confirming that three UK plots had been recently stopped.
  - Abu Hamza, the former head of London's Finsbury Park Mosque who preached Islamic terrorism, is sentenced to life in prison by a US court.
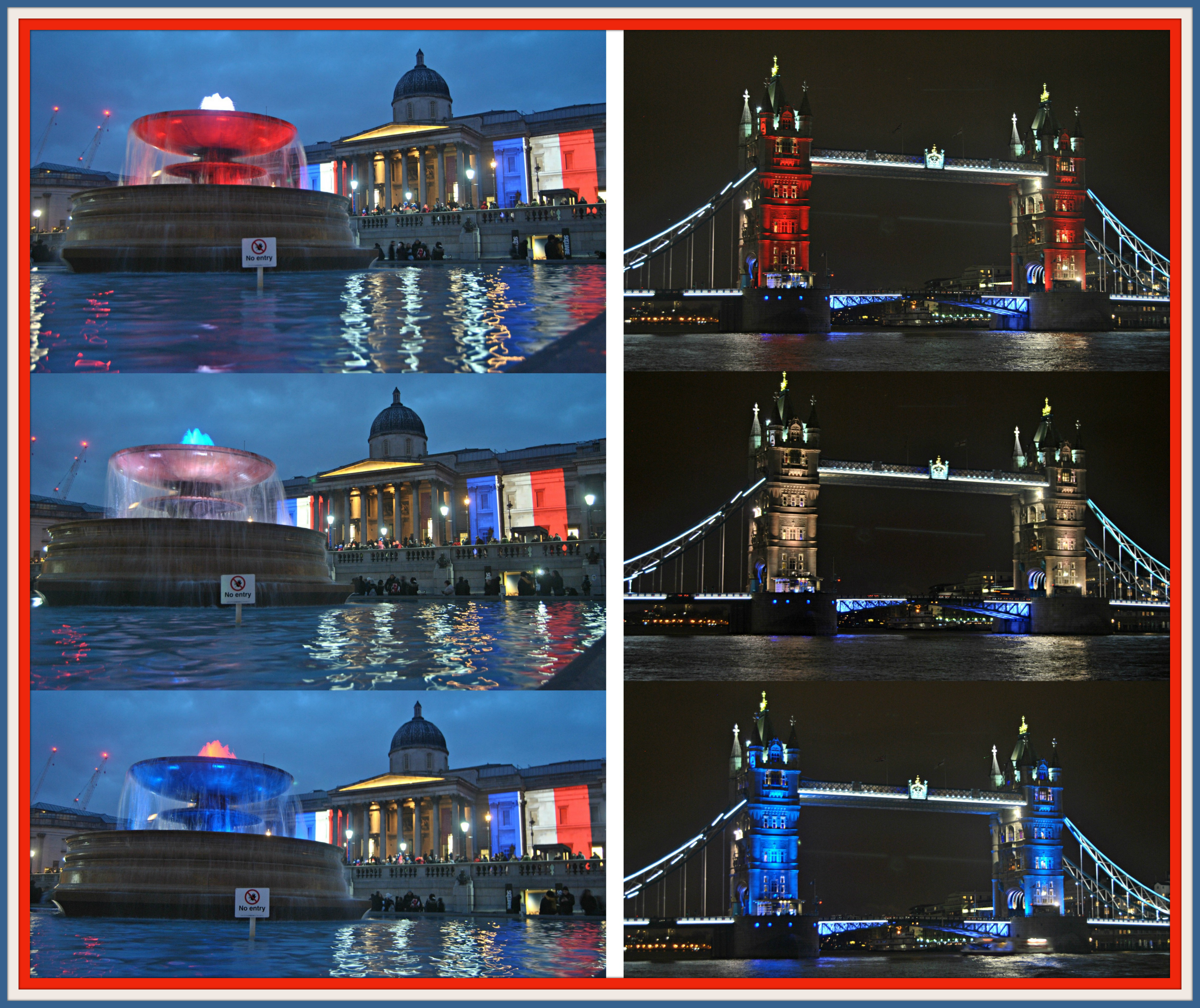
    Montage of Trafalgar Square and London Bridge being lit up in the colours of the French flag
- 11 January – Major London landmarks, including Trafalgar Square and Tower Bridge, are lit in the colours of the French national flag in tribute to the victims of the recent terrorist attacks in Paris.
- 12 January
  - 19-year-old Lewis Daynes who murdered 14-year-old Breck Bednar in February 2014 after meeting him online, is sentenced to life in prison.
  - Security chiefs meet with David Cameron to review the risk of a terrorist attack, similar to the recent attacks in Paris, as the likelihood of such an event becomes greater.
  - David Cameron brands Fox News' terror expert a "complete idiot" after he claims that Birmingham is "totally Muslim" and "non-Muslims just simply don't go in".
- 13 January – Figures show that inflation rates fell to 0.5% in December, the joint lowest on record, mainly due to the drop in fuel prices.
- 14 January
  - The Met Office warns that a storm, dubbed "Storm Rachel", will bring snow, ice, rain, floods and gale-force winds to the UK. This is after severe heavy snow and gales hit Scotland, and a tornado struck homes in Wales the previous night.
  - Ed Miliband, Nick Clegg and Nigel Farage, the leaders respectively of Labour, the Liberal Democrats and the UK Independence Party, write to Prime Minister and Conservative Party leader David Cameron to say that they will still take part in the planned pre-election televised debates even if he is not present. Cameron had said he would not take part unless the Green Party was included, but the other leaders call for the various broadcasters holding the debates to include an empty podium, enabling Cameron to be included if he changes his mind.
- 15 January
  - A set of council offices, a funeral parlour, and a thatched cottage are extensively damaged after they are set ablaze due to a spate of arson attacks in South Oxfordshire. A suspect is arrested.
  - Ethel Lang, the last person living in the UK who was born during the reign of Queen Victoria, dies aged 114.
- 16 January – UK counter-terrorism police warn that members of the Jewish community could be at risk following the recent terror incidents in Paris.
- 21 January
  - Sir John Chilcot says that his report into the Iraq war will be published after the general election. A draft version has been completed, but time is needed for those criticised by the findings of the inquiry to respond.
  - The Sun defiantly denies that it is to cease publishing topless women on Page 3 after posting a preview of its next publication featuring topless model Nicole Neal, calling the recent absence of the feature a "mammary lapse".
- 23 January – New proposals are published by the UK's major broadcasters to include the leaders of more political parties in the forthcoming televised debates. The BBC and ITV will now host seven-way debates between the leaders of the Conservatives, Labour, the Liberal Democrats, UK Independence Party, the Green Party, the Scottish National Party and Plaid Cymru. Meanwhile, Channel 4 and Sky will host head-to-head debates between David Cameron and Ed Miliband.
- 24 January
  - David Cameron and Prince Charles fly to Saudi Arabia to pay respects to the late King Abdullah who died the previous day.
  - UK Independence Party MEP Amjad Bashir defects to the Conservative Party, describing his former party as one of "ruthless self-interest". In response, UKIP claims Bashir was suspended from the party over "extremely serious" financial issues, something Bashir dismisses as "absurd and made-up allegations".
- 26 January – Libby Lane becomes the first woman ordained as a bishop in the Church of England (suffragan Bishop of Stockport), at York Minster.
- 27 January – Helen Macdonald wins the 2014 Costa Book Awards with her autobiographical H is for Hawk.
- 28 January – An earthquake of magnitude 3.8 is felt across the East Midlands.
- 30 January – Commemorations are made for the fiftieth anniversary of Sir Winston Churchill's funeral, including a church service at Westminster Abbey, and the retracing of the same boat journey that carried Churchill's coffin along the River Thames in 1965.
- 31 January – The head of the Police Federation of England and Wales expresses his controversial support for all front-line police officers in England and Wales to be offered Tasers in light of the increased terrorism threat to the UK.

=== February ===
- 2 February – London's population hits a record high of 8,600,000 which it hasn't seen since the beginning of the Second World War in 1939, and is forecast to reach 11,000,000 people by 2050.
- 3 February – MPs approve a controversial new technique to allow babies created from three people. If passed by the House of Lords, the UK will become the first country in the world to offer this medical procedure.
- 4 February
  - The entire cabinet of Rotherham Borough Council announces its intention to resign from office, following a report into the Rotherham child sexual exploitation scandal concludes the council's handling of the scandal was "not fit for purpose".
  - Home Secretary Theresa May appoints New Zealand judge Lowell Goddard to lead a new statutory inquiry into historical child sexual abuse.
- 5 February – Former pop star Gary Glitter is found guilty of sexually abusing three young girls between 1975 and 1980.
- 6 February
  - Huge changes to England's NHS in recent years have been "disastrous" and distracted from patient care, a report by the King's Fund says.
  - The Investigatory Powers Tribunal rules that GCHQ breached human rights laws by failing to disclose shared full details of information it shared with the United States that was garnered from data from mass internet surveillance.
- 9 February – A child and three adults are killed whilst four others are left seriously injured after a tipper truck crashes down a hill in Bath. An investigation is launched.
- 11 February – The government announces a review into road regulations and maintenance checks in preparation for driverless car technology.
- 13 February
  - Former TV weather presenter Fred Talbot is convicted of indecently assaulting two boys while he worked at a school in Greater Manchester, and remanded in custody to await sentence. He is cleared of a further eight charges.
  - The Prime Minister, Deputy Prime Minister and Leader of the Opposition sign a cross-party, non-partisan agreement to tackle climate change, seek a strong global climate deal, and to end the use of coal for power generation in the UK.
- 14 February – Four people are killed following two separate accidents on major motorways; three die after a coach collides with a stationary car on the M1 and one person dies in a forty vehicle pileup on the M40.
- 16 February – A study by King's College London indicates an increased risk of psychosis among those who smoke potent cannabis.
- 17 February
  - Consumer price inflation fell to 0.3% in January, according to latest official figures, its lowest level since records began.
  - Abid Naseer, a man who plotted a terrorist attack on a shopping centre in Manchester in 2009, which would have reportedly only come second to the September 11 attacks in its impact, stands trial in the United States.
  - Five Britons are announced to be amongst the 100 Mars One applicants shortlisted for a one-way trip to Mars to become the first humans to set foot on the planet.
- 18 February – The Metropolitan Police says it will examine video footage appearing to show fans of Chelsea football club preventing a black man from boarding a train on the Paris Metro.
- 20 February – Police appeal for help after it is feared that three London schoolgirls who have gone missing, are travelling to Turkey with the intention of crossing the border into Syria and joining a terror group ISIL.
- 21 February – The government pledges £300,000,000 for tackling dementia, aiming to become a "world leader" in research with a global fund to produce new treatments by 2025.
- 24 February – Conservative MP Sir Malcolm Rifkind resigns as Chair of the Parliamentary Intelligence and Security Committee, and announces he will vacate his seat at the general election, following a cash for access scandal.
- 26 February
  - An independent report finds that Jimmy Savile sexually abused 63 people connected to Stoke Mandeville Hospital between 1968 and 1992, but the one formal complaint made was ignored.
  - The masked Islamic State militant known as "Jihadi John", responsible for the beheadings of numerous Western hostages, is named as Mohammed Emwazi from West London.
- 27 February – Following his guilty verdict on 5 February, former pop star Gary Glitter is sentenced to sixteen year's imprisonment.

=== March ===
- 3 March – Disgraced entertainer Rolf Harris is stripped of his British honours.
- 4 March – The stepbrother of 16-year-old Becky Watts, a schoolgirl reported missing two weeks previously, is charged with her murder after body parts are found at a house in Barton Hill, Bristol.
- 5 March – David Cameron is accused of "cowering" from the public as he confirms that he will only take part in one televised debate ahead of the general election, rejecting proposals for a head-to-head with Labour leader Ed Miliband.
- 6 March
  - A 13-year-old boy pleads guilty to the murder of 53-year-old Christopher Barry who was fatally stabbed in Edmonton, London, in December.
  - The UK's major broadcasters confirm they will press ahead with plans for three televised debates, even though David Cameron said he would only participate in one of them.
- 7 March
  - Deputy Prime Minister and Liberal Democrat leader Nick Clegg says he will take David Cameron's place in the forthcoming television debates, if Cameron is unwilling to participate.
  - A pitch invasion by Aston Villa fans temporarily halts the club's FA Cup quarter-final match against West Bromwich Albion. Several fans run onto the pitch during stoppage time to prematurely celebrate Villa's 2–0 victory over West Brom, forcing referee Anthony Taylor to stop the game until order is restored, before hundreds of fans then invade the pitch on the final whistle. The incident will be investigated by the Football Association.
- 8 March – Ed Miliband says that a future Labour government would introduce legislation to make televised debates a permanent feature of future general election campaigns, meaning politicians could not attempt to prevent them from taking place out of self-interest.
- 9 March
  - The UK Government finally pays off War Loan bonds, originally introduced to consolidate debt incurred in fighting World War I.
  - Thendara Satisfaction, an Irish Setter who competed at this year's Crufts, dies after being supposedly poisoned at the Birmingham show. Organisers of the event say sabotage will not be tolerated, after rumours that various other dogs were also poisoned this year.
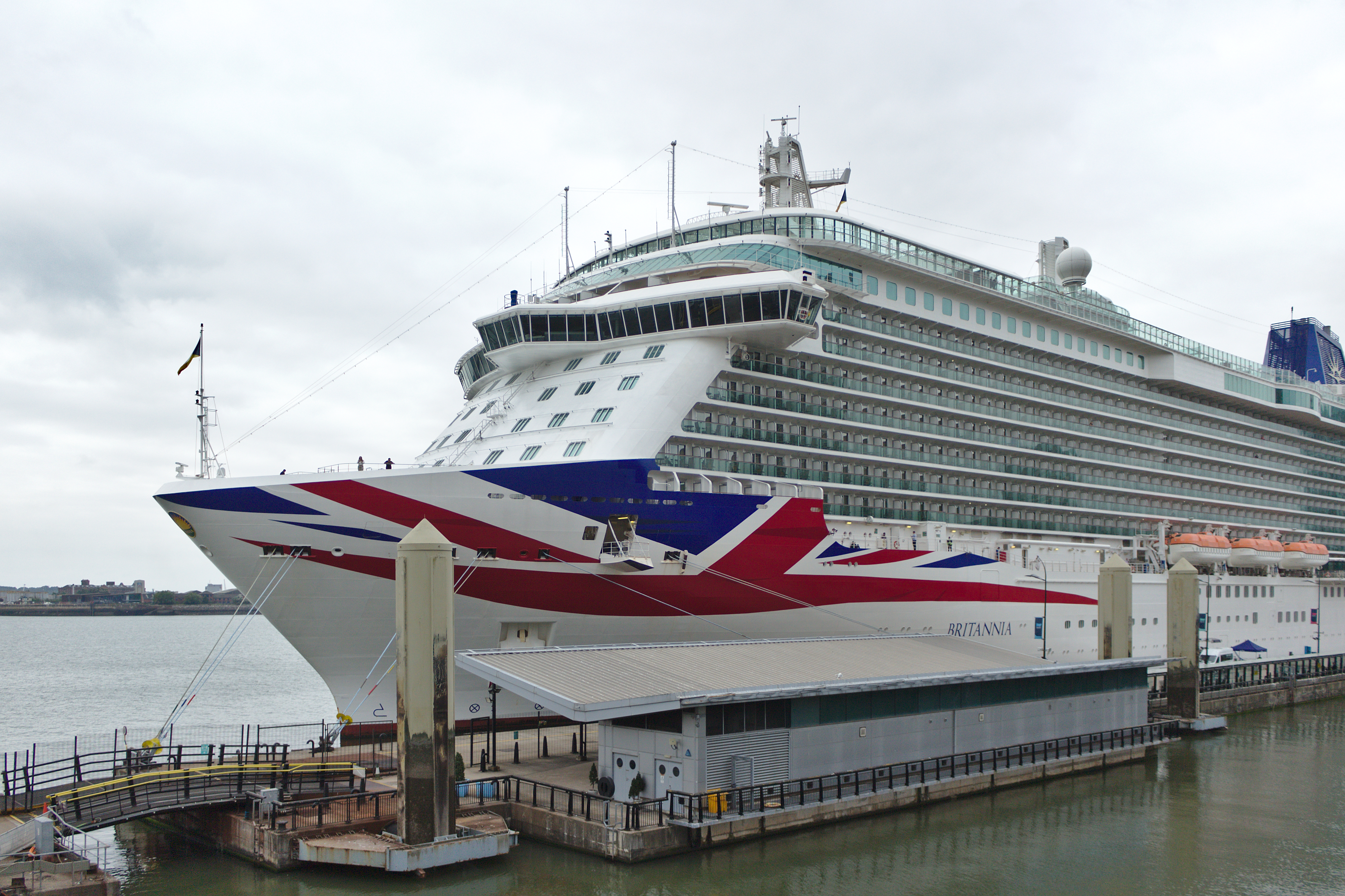
    Britannia cruise ship (pictured in 2021)
- 10 March
  - TV presenter Jeremy Clarkson is suspended from Top Gear, one of the BBC's most popular and profitable shows, following a "fracas" with a producer. The remainder of the series will be scrapped, the BBC says.
  - Queen Elizabeth II names the new luxury cruise ship Britannia, the largest ever cruise ship designed for the British holiday market.
- 11 March – The government announces the first NHS patients to be diagnosed through genome sequencing.
- 13 March – Following his guilty verdict on 13 February, former TV weather presenter Fred Talbot is sentenced to five years in prison.
- 15 March – Northampton Greyfriars bus station is demolished.
- 17 March
  - Chief Superintendent David Duckenfield admits that his failure to shut a tunnel to football terraces was the direct cause of ninety-six deaths at the Hillsborough disaster in 1989.
  - David Cameron confirms he has accepted an offer from the major broadcasters to participate in a seven-way televised debate at the beginning of April. However, the full details of this are yet to be confirmed.
- 19 March – One Briton is confirmed to be amongst the twenty-one victims killed in the ISIL backed Bardo National Museum shootings in the Tunisian capital, Tunis.
- 20 March
  - A partial solar eclipse occurs, ranging from 85% totality in London and southern England to 98% totality in northern Scotland.
  - UKIP MEP and general election candidate Janice Atkinson is suspended from the UK Independence Party after a member of her staff tried to overcharge EU expenses for a restaurant bill. The incident emerges as another UKIP election candidate, Stephen Howe, is suspended amid harassment allegations, and a third, Jonathan Stanley, resigns from the party because of what he alleges to be its "open racism and sanctimonious bullying."
- 21 March – The UK's major broadcasters say they have agreed to hold a seven-party televised leaders debate on 2 April, which will be staged by ITV and chaired by Julie Etchingham. However, there will be no head-to-head between David Cameron and Ed Miliband, with them instead taking part in a separate question and answer session aired jointly by Sky News and Channel 4 on 26 March. A debate featuring five opposition leaders will air on BBC One on 16 April.
- 22 March – Membership of the Scottish National Party officially crosses the 100,000 mark, meaning that one in every fifty of the Scottish population is now a member.
- 23 March
  - Afzal Amin, the Conservative candidate for Dudley North, resigns from the party after being accused of allegedly conspiring with the English Defence League to win votes.
  - David Cameron tells BBC News he will not serve a third term as prime minister if the Conservatives are re-elected in the upcoming general election.
  - Janice Atkinson is expelled from UKIP for "bringing the party into disrepute".
- 24 March – UK inflation fell to zero per cent in February, the lowest level since records began, according to official figures.
- 25 March
  - It is confirmed that three Britons were among those killed when an Airbus A320 crashed into the French Alps the previous day, with no survivors.
  - Following a two-week investigation into a verbal and physical attack on producer Oisin Tymon, the BBC confirms that Top Gear presenter Jeremy Clarkson has been sacked from the programme.
- 26 March – The order of succession to the British throne is changed to absolute primogeniture, in accordance with the 2011 Perth Agreement and the Succession to the Crown Act 2013. The change also applies in the Commonwealth realms. Marrying a Roman Catholic no longer disqualifies a person from succeeding to the Crown.
- 29 March – Police are investigating alleged death threats against BBC Director-General Tony Hall over the decision to sack Jeremy Clarkson from his Top Gear presenting role.

=== April ===
- 1 April – English Heritage begins to operate as a charitable trust to manage the nation's portfolio of historic properties, while Historic England is formed to take on its previous functions in statutory planning, advice on and protection of the historic built environment.
- 2 April – The only televised leaders debate to include Prime Minister David Cameron is aired by ITV. The debate features the leaders of the Conservatives, Labour, the Liberal Democrats, UKIP, the Greens, the Scottish National Party and Plaid Cymru.
- 2–7 April – An estimated £200,000,000 worth of jewels are stolen from Hatton Garden Safe Deposit Ltd, Hatton Garden central London, in a meticulously planned heist that takes place over the Easter bank holiday weekend. CCTV footage later emerges, at the website of UK newspaper the Daily Mirror, showing the thieves dressed as building workers and using wheelie bins.
- 10 April – Police are investigating after it emerged that they received an emergency call from the scene of the Hatton Garden safety deposit raid, but decided not to respond.
- 11 April
  - Many Clouds, ridden by Leighton Aspell, wins the 2015 Grand National. This is Aspell's second consecutive Grand National win after riding Pineau de Re to victory the previous year.
  - Oxford beat Cambridge in the first Women's Boat Race to be rowed on the same course on the same day as the men's race (which Oxford also win).
  - Tennis player Andy Murray marries his fiancée Kim Sears at a ceremony in his home town of Dunblane.
- 16 April – The Crown Prosecution Service issues a statement indicating that Labour peer Greville Janner will not face prosecution over allegations of child sexual abuse owing to his poor health.
- 21 April – Following a six-week trial, Justin Robertson is jailed for life with a minimum tariff of thirty-two years for the September 2014 contract killing of Pennie Davis at the behest of her stepson. Benjamin Carr, who paid Robertson £1,500 to carry out the killing, is convicted of conspiracy to murder and will serve at least thirty years.
- 22 April – Supermarket retailer Tesco posts a record £6,400,000,000 annual loss for the year ending in February 2015.
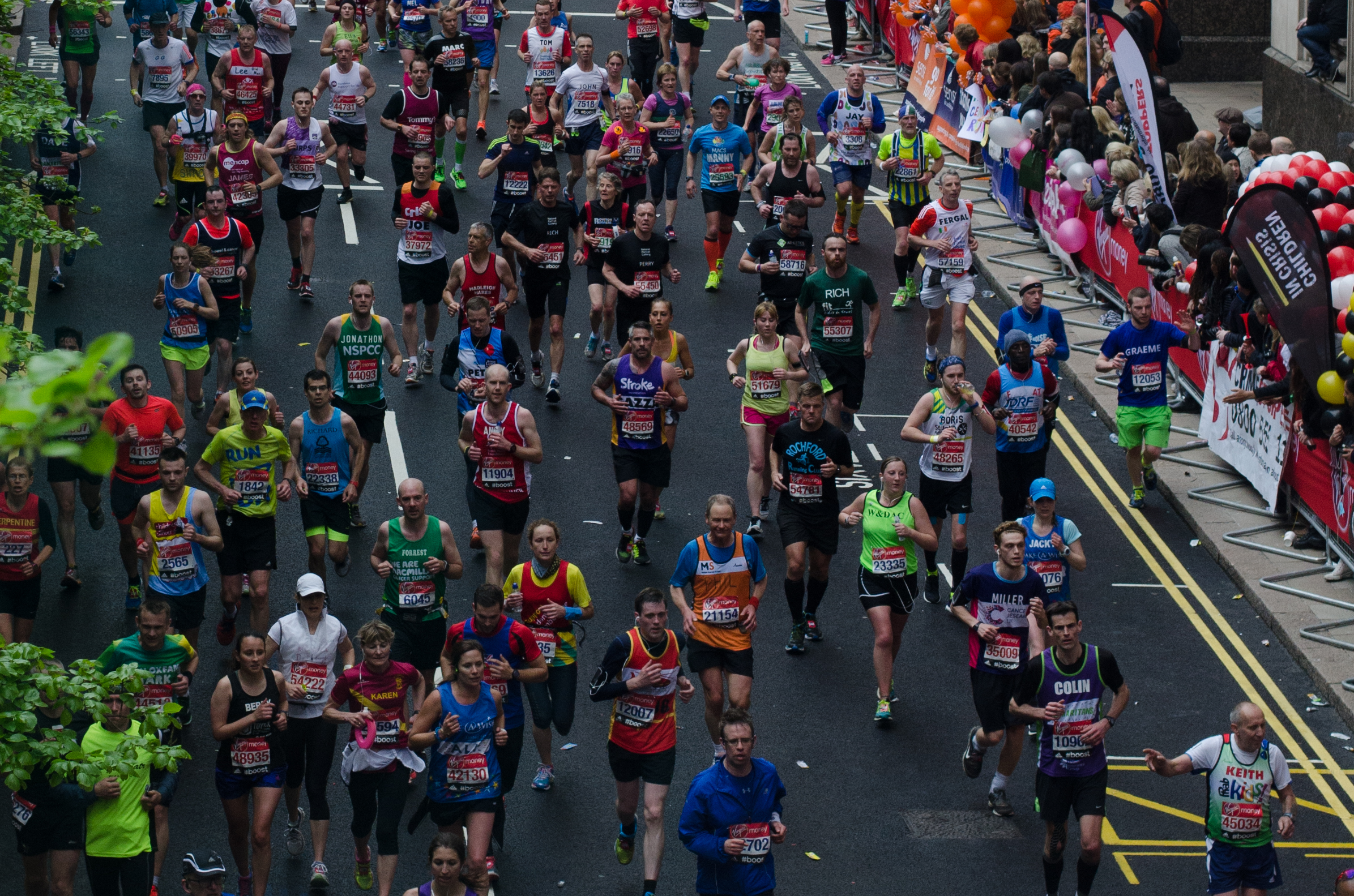
  Participants in the 2015 London Marathon
- 26 April
  - More than 38,000 people take part in this year's London Marathon, making it the biggest in the event's thirty-five-year history.
  - The government donates £5,000,000 and humanitarian aid to help people affected by the recent earthquake in Nepal, which killed over 6,000 people.
- 27 April
  - The British Red Cross confirms that there are still dozens of Britons who have still not been traced following the earthquake in Nepal two days earlier.
  - Former Oxfordshire nurse Andrew Hutchinson is jailed for eighteen years for a rape, sexual assault and voyeurism case involving unconscious women between 2011 and 2013; two of which took place at the John Radcliffe Hospital in Oxford.
- 28 April – Figures show that the rate of economic growth halved to 0.3% in the first quarter, marking the slowest quarterly growth in two years.
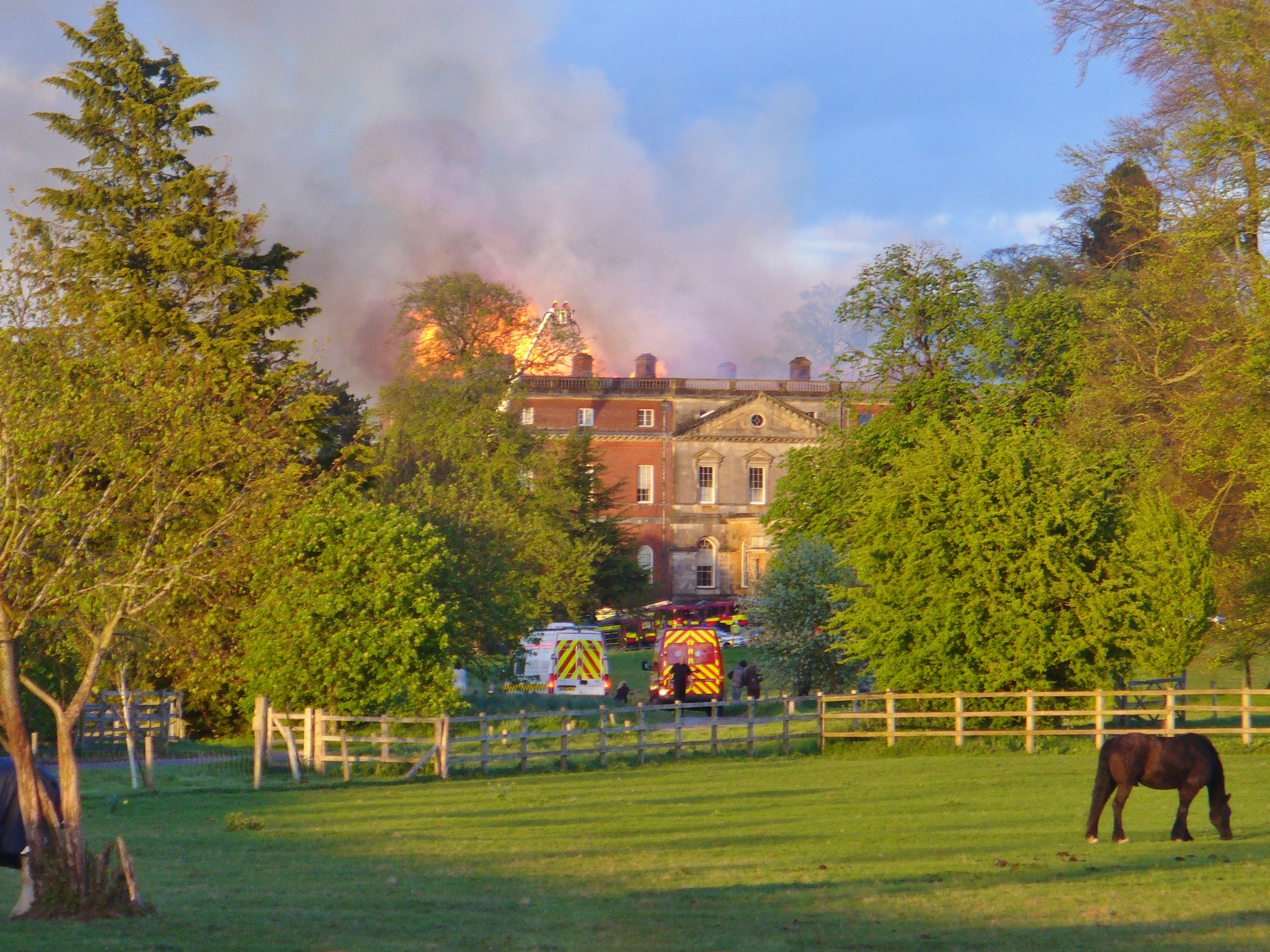
  Clandon Park House catches fire
- 29 April
  - The UK Supreme Court rules that the government must take immediate action to cut air pollution, following a case brought by lawyers at ClientEarth.
  - 18-year-old Kazi Islam, who was inspired by the murder of Lee Rigby, is convicted by a jury at the Old Bailey of grooming a vulnerable friend to kill two soldiers, and buying ingredients for a pipe bomb.
  - The Foreign Office confirms that a Briton living overseas was among the 6,000 victims killed in the Nepal earthquake, and it is feared that another British national has been killed at the Everest Base Camp.
  - A blaze causes extensive damage at Clandon Park House, a stately home in Surrey.
- 30 April – The three main political party leaders, David Cameron, Ed Miliband and Nick Clegg, take part in the final televised debate before the general election on a special edition of Question Time.

=== May ===
- 2 May – The Duchess of Cambridge gives birth to a daughter at St Mary's Hospital in London who becomes fourth in line to the throne and Elizabeth II's fifth great-grandchild. She is subsequently named Charlotte Elizabeth Diana.
- 4 May – The 2015 World Snooker Championship concludes with Stuart Bingham defeating Shaun Murphy 18–15 in the final to win his first world title.
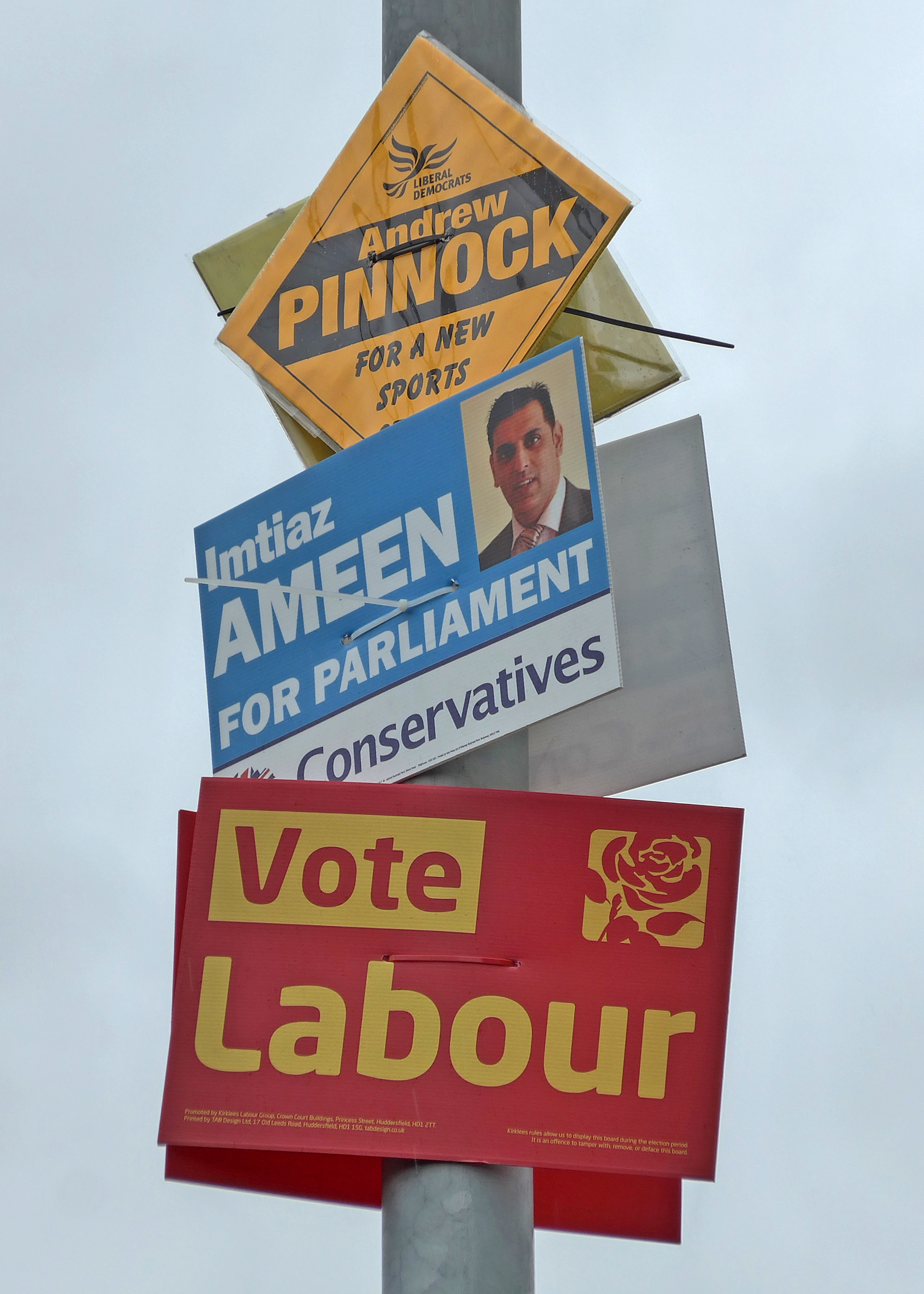
  Election posters in Batley and Spen
- 7 May
  - 2015 general election: The Conservative Party win an outright majority with 331 seats, securing David Cameron a second term in office. Meanwhile, in Scotland, a huge surge to the Scottish National Party sees the party win 56 of the 59 Scottish seats available, an increase of 50 seats compared to their 2010 total. The Labour Party win 232 seats, with modest gains in England more than offset by heavy losses in Scotland, while the Liberal Democrats are almost wiped out with just 8 of their previous 57 seats remaining. UKIP hold one seat and lose one, failing to gain any more despite a huge increase in vote share. The Green Party also hold their sole seat. The Conversatives' majority win is unexpected, as most opinion polls indicated a very tight race, with a high chance of a hung parliament.
  - 2015 local elections: Elections also take place in 279 councils across England, with the Conservatives gaining 25 councils to control 130 overall; the Labour Party lose four seats, leaving them with 67 councils; while the Liberal Democrats lose 4 to control 3 councils.
- 8 May
  - Ed Miliband, Nick Clegg and Nigel Farage, the three respective leaders of the Labour Party, the Liberal Democrats and the UK Independence Party, all announce their resignations in the wake of their electoral defeats.
  - Commemorations are held to celebrate the seventieth anniversary of VE Day, the end of World War II on the continent.
- 11 May – Nigel Farage announces he will stay on as UKIP leader, reversing his previous decision to resign, after the party rejects his resignation, saying there is "overwhelming evidence" that members disagree with his decision to quit.
- 13 May – Figures show that unemployment fell to 1,830,000 in the first quarter, a 35,000 decrease from the last quarter, and the lowest figure in seven years.
- 15 May – The Rail, Maritime and Transport workers union (RMT) announce that Network Rail workers will stage a 24-hour strike from 5.00pm on 25 May over pay and conditions, the first national rail strike in the UK for two decades. The strike is called off on 21 May after a pay deal is reached with Network Rail management.
- 16 May – The Church of Scotland votes to allow the ordination of gay ministers in civil partnerships.
- 19 May
  - Prince Charles begins his official four-day tour of the Republic of Ireland having a controversial meeting with Sinn Féin leader Gerry Adams.
  - Figures show that the main measure of inflation turned negative in April for the first time on record, falling to −0.1%.
  - Nine men are arrested, and eight charged the following day, in connection with the Hatton Garden safe deposit burglary in early April.
- 21 May – Cashless payments now exceed the use of notes and coins, with cash volumes expected to fall by 30% over the next ten years, according to the Payments Council.
- 22 May – An earthquake of magnitude 4.2 is felt across East Kent.
- 28 May – The RMT calls two national strikes for June after failing to reach a deal with Network Rail management. A 24-hour strike will begin at 5.00pm on 4 June, and a 48-hour strike will take place from 5.00pm on 9 June. The strikes are suspended on 1 June, after a 2% salary increase offer from Network Rail.
- 30 May – In football, Arsenal win the 2015 FA Cup Final defeating Aston Villa 4–0 at Wembley.

=== June ===
- 1 June
  - National rail strikes planned for 4 and 9 June are called off after a pay deal is reached.
  - Charles Kennedy, former leader of the Liberal Democrats, dies aged 55 in Fort William, Scotland, of haemorrhage linked to alcoholism.
- 2 June – A serious collision on The Smiler ride at Alton Towers causes four people to be airlifted to hospital due to their injuries. The incident is one of the biggest accidents ever to occur at Alton Towers, and the park is closed for several days pending investigations.
- 3 June – Jo Cox gives her maiden speech in Parliament.
- 6 June – Golden Horn, ridden by Frankie Dettori, wins the 2015 Epsom Derby.
- 9 June – HSBC, the world's largest banking retailer, announce plans to cut 25,000 jobs worldwide, including 8,000 in the UK. It also plans to close some of its UK branches, and rename the HSBC brand in the UK.
- 10 June
  - Chancellor George Osborne announces government plans to sell off its stake in the Royal Bank of Scotland.
  - A nationwide poll to find a national bird for the UK chooses the robin as the public's favourite candidate.
- 11 June – A youth is detained by police after a teacher is stabbed in front of students at a school in Bradford.
- 13 June – Trooping the Colour takes place in London marking the Queen's official birthday. It is the Duchess of Cambridge's first appearance since the birth of Princess Charlotte. Prince George also makes his first appearance on the balcony of Buckingham Palace.
- 14 June – A statue of Queen Elizabeth II is unveiled by Speaker John Bercow at Runnymede in Surrey ahead of the celebrations of Magna Carta.
- 15 June – The royal family, the Prime Minister, the Archbishop of Canterbury and other dignitaries attend a ceremony at Runnymede to mark the eight-hundredth anniversary of Magna Carta.
- 18 June – A government report reveals that the Palace of Westminster is in need of repair, and recommends that MPs leave the building for two years in order for the repairs to be carried out.
- 20 June – Some 250,000 people take to the streets in cities such as London, Bristol and Manchester in a demonstration backed by the People's Assembly Against Austerity to protest against the UK Government's austerity programme.
- 24 June – It is announced that Buckingham Palace is in need of repair and the Royal Household debates whether the Queen should move to Windsor Castle.
- 25 June – The UK population has grown by almost 500,000 to reach 64,596,800 in 2014 – an above average increase compared with increases over the last decade – according to the Office for National Statistics (ONS). The percentage of older people continues to increase, and the median age is now forty years, the highest ever recorded.
- 26 June – At least 30 Britons are among 38 people believed to be dead after a terrorist attack on a beach near the Tunisian resort town of Sousse.
- 28 June
  - The 14th Dalai Lama makes an appearance at the 2015 Glastonbury Festival, praising the event as "a festival of people, not governments or politicians".
  - A coach driver from Northern Ireland is killed, and several teachers and schoolchildren from Brentwood in Essex are injured, after a coach crashes near Ostend in Belgium.
- 29 June
  - A major planning application by energy firm Cuadrilla to begin fracking in Lancashire is rejected by the local council.
  - Production ceases at the last deep coal mine in the South Yorkshire Coalfield, Hatfield Colliery.
- 30 June – Police officers, intelligence officials, soldiers and emergency services take part in a counter-terrorism exercise, codenamed Strong Tower, in London. The terror attack simulation has been six months in the planning and is the country's largest such exercise to date.

=== July ===
- 1 July – A level three "heatwave action" heat-health alert is declared by the Met Office, as a temperature of 36.7 °C is recorded at Heathrow in London; the hottest UK temperature in twelve years, and the hottest July day on record.
- 3 July
  - Across the UK, a one-minute silence is held at midday to remember the 38 victims – including 30 British people – who died in the Tunisia beach attack a week earlier.
  - Production is suspended at the last substantial coal mine in Wales, Aberpergwm.
- 4 July – England finish third in the 2015 Women's World Cup after defeating Germany 1–0 in the third place play-off.
- 5 July
  - Lewis Hamilton wins the 2015 British Grand Prix.
  - UNESCO gives the Forth Bridge the status of a World Heritage Site.
  - Government redeems the last four undated bonds in its portfolio, including the last consolidated liabilities from the collapse of the South Sea Company in 1720.
- 6 July – A major incident is declared by Sussex Police after two people are left with life-threatening injuries as two double-decker buses collide on North Street, Brighton.
- 7 July – The UK marks the tenth anniversary of the 7/7 attacks with memorial services and one minute's silence.
- 8 July – As part of his first Conservative Budget, the Chancellor George Osborne unveils billions in welfare cuts, but also announces a National Living Wage of £9 an hour by 2020.
- 9 July – Tube and train strikes cause travel chaos in and around London, with the entire London Underground network shut down and many rail services cancelled.
- 10 July
  - Production ceases at the last deep coal mine in Nottinghamshire, Thoresby Colliery.
  - Thousands of British holidaymakers begin to return home from Tunisia after a warning from the Foreign Office that another terror attack is "highly likely".
- 13 July – Hundreds of flights are disrupted at Heathrow Airport in London after members of the climate change protest group Plane Stupid break through the metal fence, get onto the northern runway, and chain themselves together in protest.
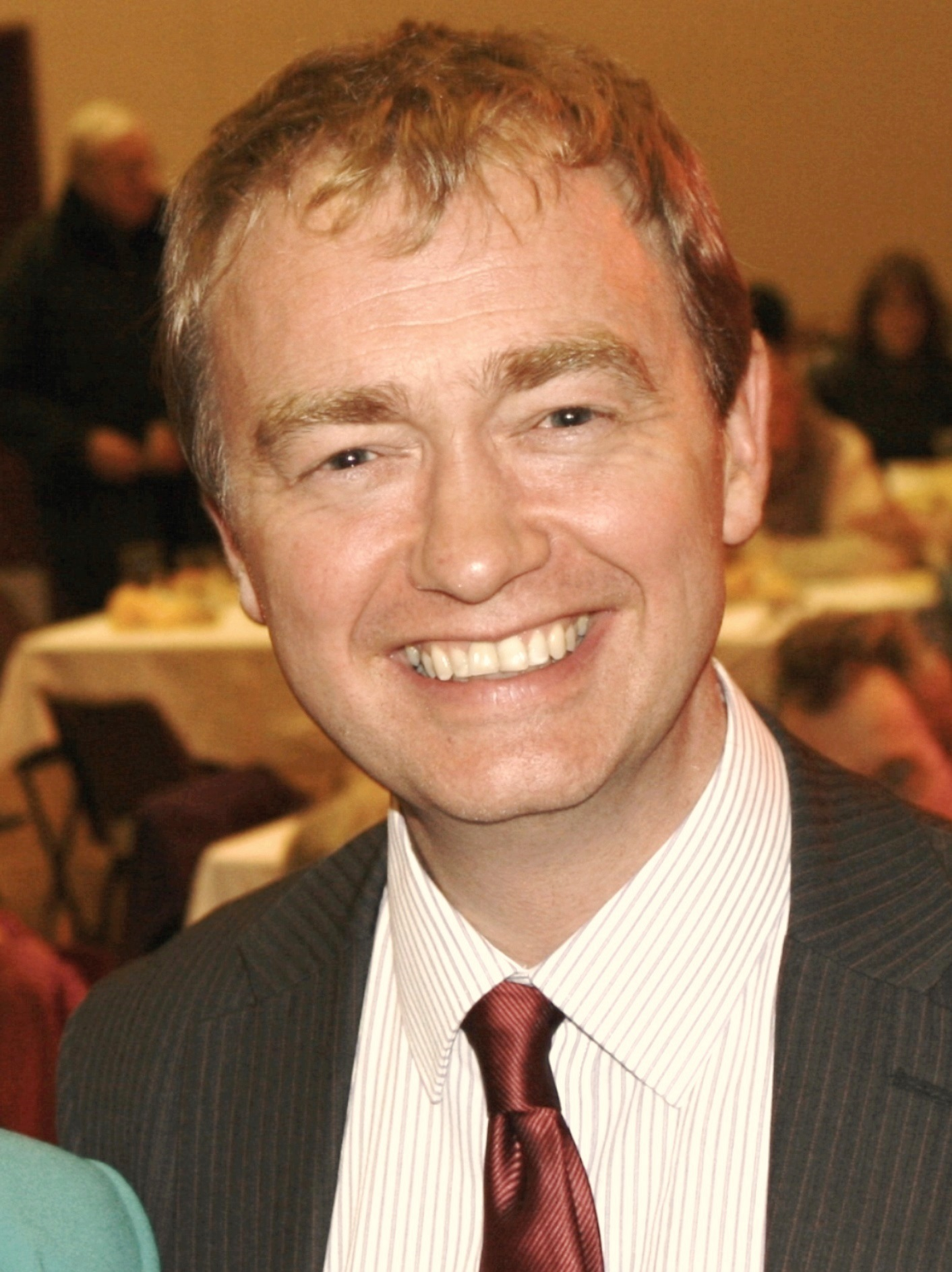
  Tim Farron, newly elected leader of the Liberal Democrats
- 16 July – Tim Farron is elected as the new leader of the Liberal Democrats.
- 17 July
  - The first female genital mutilation protection order in the UK is obtained by Bedfordshire Police, preventing two young girls thought to be at risk from travelling to Africa.
  - Four people are thought to be trapped and four others are taken to hospital, after three explosions at a wood treatment works in Bosley near Macclesfield in Cheshire.
- 20 July – In golf, Zach Johnson of the USA wins the 2015 Open Championship, the 144th edition of the tournament, at St Andrews, Fife, defeating South Africa's Louis Oosthuizen and Marc Leishman of Australia in a playoff.
- 21 July – Chancellor George Osborne launches a spending review that calls for £20 billion of cuts to Whitehall budgets. Each unprotected department is asked to create savings plans of between 25% and 40% of their budget.
- 22 July – The University of Birmingham finds in its archives the oldest known surviving fragments of the Koran, and plans to put them on public display.
- 26 July – Great Britain's Chris Froome wins the 2015 Tour de France. This is Froome's second victory in the event, having also won the race in 2013, and marks the third time in four years that the event has been won by a British rider.
- 27 July
  - Members of the Norwich sexual abuse ring are found guilty of the sexual abuse of children, with the crimes spanning a decade. Ringleader Marie Black is convicted of 23 counts of sex abuse, including rape.
  - A train is derailed at Chilham in Kent after hitting cows on the line, but the passengers manage to escape unharmed.
  - The Metropolitan Police launch a criminal investigation after Lord Sewel, the former Deputy Lords Speaker, is filmed allegedly taking cocaine with prostitutes.
- 28 July – The Eurotunnel migrant crisis worsens as its reported that 2,000 migrants tried to enter the Channel Tunnel terminal in Calais in an attempt to reach the UK the previous night.
- 31 July – A private jet crashes at a car auction site near Blackbushe Airport in Hampshire, killing its pilot and three passengers.

=== August ===
- August – Arden University is relaunched as a distance learning degree-granting institution under this name, based in Coventry.
- 1 August – Singer and television star Cilla Black, whose showbiz career spanned over fifty years, dies at her villa in Spain, aged 72.
- 4 August – Former prime minister Sir Edward Heath, who died in 2005, is investigated by police forces as part of their inquiries into allegations of historical child abuse.
- 6 August – A second transport worker's strike causes chaos in London, with the entire London Underground network shut down.
- 10 August – The youth who stabbed teacher Vincent Uzomah at a Bradford school on 11 June is sentenced to eleven years' detention.
- 15 August – Commemorations are held to celebrate the seventieth anniversary of VJ Day, the end of World War II in the Far East.
- 17 August – The London Borough of Lambeth becomes the first council in the United Kingdom to ban the use of laughing gas for recreational use.
- 18 August – One Briton is confirmed to be amongst the twenty people killed during the Ratchaprasong bombing in Bangkok, Thailand, which occurred the previous day.
- 20 August – Hundreds of fans, family and fellow stars turn out to pay their respects to the singer and television star, Cilla Black, at her funeral in Liverpool.
- 22 August – An RAF Hawker Hunter crashes into vehicles on the A27 near Shoreham in West Sussex during the Shoreham Airshow; eleven people are killed and fourteen injured.
- 24 August
  - British IT consultant Chris Norman is awarded the Légion d'Honneur, France's highest decoration, for his bravery in the 2015 Thalys train attack in France.
  - British IndyCar driver Justin Wilson dies in hospital after an accident during a race at the Pocono Raceway in Pennsylvania, United States.

=== September ===
- 4 September – David Cameron announces that the UK is to provide resettlement to thousands more Syrian refugees in response to the worsening migrant crisis.
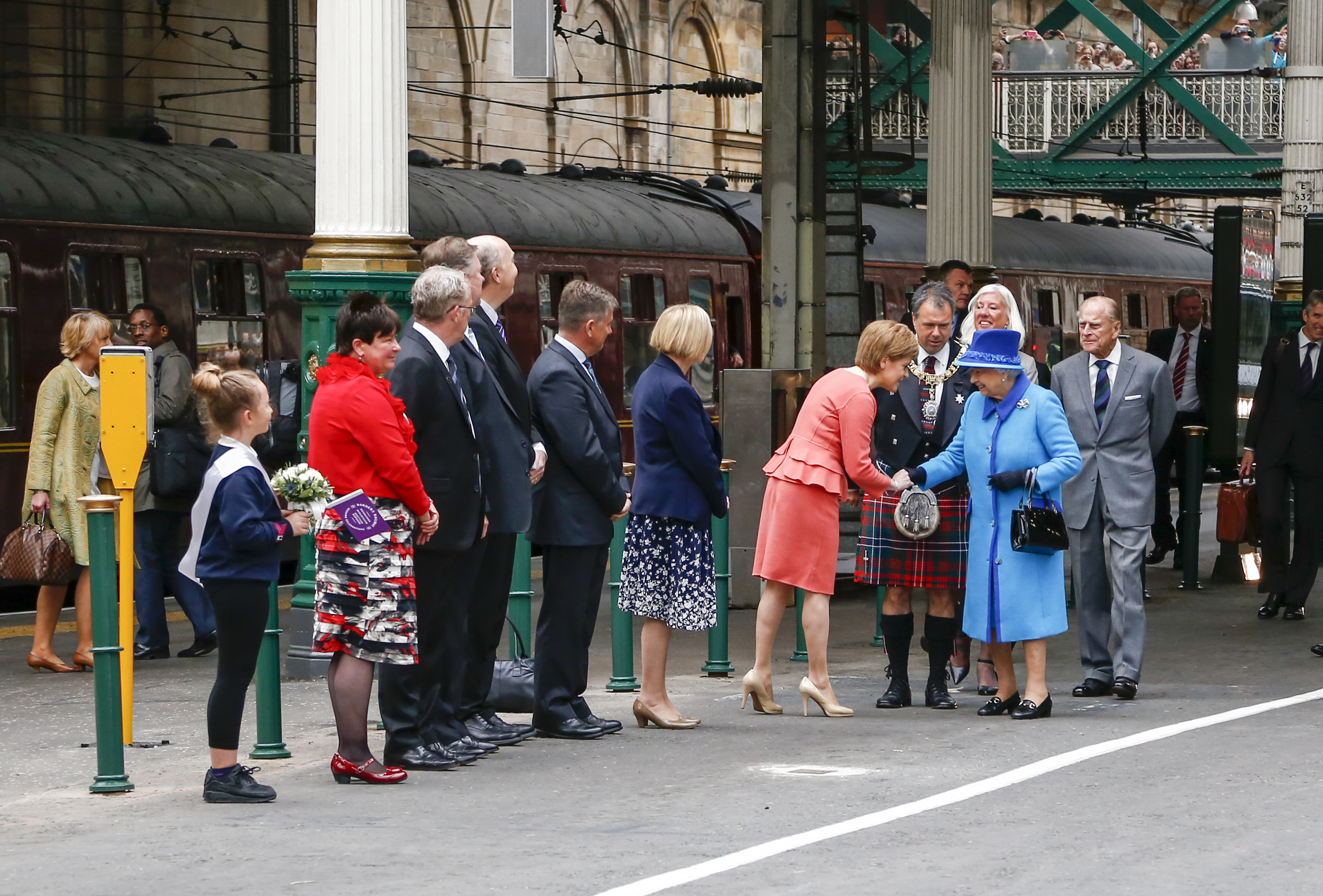
  The official opening of the Borders Railway
- 6 September
  - Rail transport returns to the Scottish Borders after forty-six years with the reopening of the Waverley Route between Edinburgh and Tweedbank, under the name of the Borders Railway.
  - Homeowners in Lancashire are told that their water supplies are safe and back to normal after a microbial parasite contaminated drinking water for more than three weeks.
  - The Lieutenant Governor of Guernsey, Peter Walker, dies in office.
- 7 September – Two British Islamic State jihadists, who were planning "barbaric" attacks on British soil, are confirmed dead after the first targeted UK drone attack on a British citizen last month.
- 8 September - England Footballer Wayne Rooney becomes the England national football team all-time leading goalscorer with 50 goals in a 2–0 win vs Switzerland national football team, surpassing the previous record of 49 goals held by Bobby Charlton since 1968. The record would last until 23 March 2023 when it would be broken by Harry Kane in a 2–1 win vs Italy national football team.
- 9 September – Queen Elizabeth II surpasses her great-great-grandmother Queen Victoria as the United Kingdom's longest-reigning monarch, as she declares the Borders Railway officially open.
- 11 September – MPs reject plans for a right to die in England and Wales in their first vote on the issue in almost twenty years.
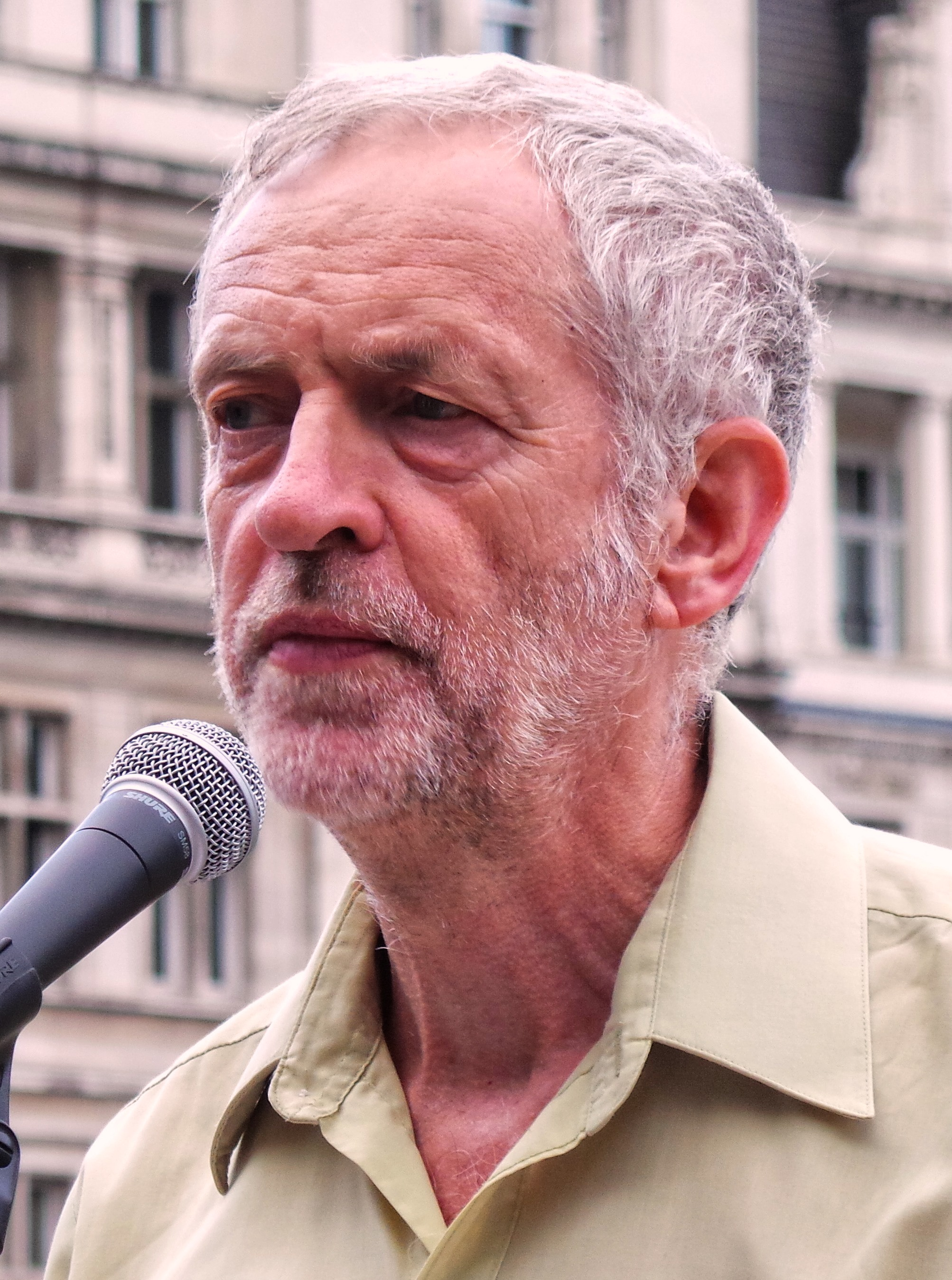
  Newly elected leader of the Labour Party Jeremy Corbyn
- 12 September – Jeremy Corbyn is elected as the new leader of the Labour Party, with Tom Watson as deputy leader.
- 15 September – A flypast takes place at Goodwood in West Sussex to mark the seventy-fifth anniversary of the Battle of Britain. A service to mark the occasion is also held at St Paul's Cathedral in London, attended by David Cameron, Jeremy Corbyn, and the visiting President of Poland.
- 22 September – Chancellor George Osborne says during a visit to China that the country "must be the United Kingdom's number two export market".
- 26 September – A fire damages the United Kingdom's largest mosque, the Baitul Futuh Mosque in Morden, London.
- 28 September
  - Members of a Norwich sexual abuse ring are jailed for "utterly depraved" sex abuse of children over a period of ten years. Ringleader Marie Black received the longest sentence of life imprisonment, with a minimum term of 24 years.
  - Steelmaker SSI, owner of the Teesside Steelworks at Redcar in North Yorkshire, announces that it is to close, with the loss of 1,700 jobs.
- 30 September
  - Volkswagen announces that 1,200,000 of its vehicles sold in the UK are affected by the software behind the emissions scandal, including cars with the VW brand, Audi, Seat, Skodă and VW vans.
  - David Cameron faces demands from campaigners to apologise and pay financial reparations for the United Kingdom's role in the historic slave trade in the Caribbean, during a state visit to Jamaica. Government loans taken out to compensate slaveowners under the Slavery Abolition Act 1833 are finally repaid this year.
  - Doctors are granted approval by the Health Research Authority to carry out the first ten womb transplants in the UK, following the success of the procedure in Sweden.

=== October ===
- 1 October
  - A new law banning smoking in vehicles carrying children comes into force in England and Wales.
  - New consumer protections come into force under the Consumer Rights Act, guaranteeing a full refund for faulty goods up to thirty days after purchase.
- 2 October – A 15-year old British boy from Blackburn, who plotted to behead police officers at an Anzac Day parade in Australia, is sentenced to life in prison.
- 3 October
  - A woman and an eight-year-old boy are killed and several others are seriously injured, after a double-decker bus crashes into a supermarket in Coventry.
  - Two people are killed after their light aircraft crashes into a field near Chigwell in Essex.
  - Denis Healey, former Chancellor of the Exchequer and Deputy Leader of the Labour Party, dies, aged 98.
- 5 October
  - England becomes the last country in the UK to introduce a mandatory 5p charge for plastic carrier bags at supermarkets.
  - Archaeologists start digging up the remains of a Spitfire that crashed in the Cambridgeshire fens in 1940.
  - Merseyside Police officer David Phillips, dies after being hit by a stolen pick-up truck he was trying to stop; the force begins a major search for the perpetrator the following day.
- 7 October – Peter Ball (who in 1993 had resigned as Bishop of Gloucester having been given a police caution for gross indecency with a 19-year-old man) is sentenced at the Old Bailey to 32 months in prison on two counts of indecent assault and one of misconduct in a public office after admitting the abuse of 18 young men over the period from 1977 to 1992.
- 12 October – University College Chichester, in West Sussex, is recognised as a full university, the University of Chichester.
- 13 October – Home Office figures show that hate crimes in England and Wales have risen by 18% from the last year; with 80% classed as race hate crimes, and others involving religion, disability, sexuality and transgender victims.
- 15 October – The Stirling Prize, the United Kingdom's top architectural award, is given to Burntwood School in Wandsworth, London.
- 16 October – Scottish National Party leader Nicola Sturgeon announces at the annual SNP conference, that party membership now stands at 114,221 members.
- 19 October – Chinese President Xi Jinping arrives at Heathrow Airport for his first state visit to the UK.
- 21 October – Michael Meacher, the Labour MP for Oldham West and Royton, dies in office.
- 22 October – The voting rights of MPs representing constituencies in Scotland, Wales and Northern Ireland are to be restricted, after the Conservative Government wins a vote on its controversial 'English votes for English laws’ (EVEL) plans.
- 23 October – A "significant and sustained" cyberattack is made on the website of telecoms firm TalkTalk, with personal and banking details of up to 4,000,000 customers being accessed and the firm's CEO receiving a ransom email purported to be from the hackers.
- 25 October
  - The Royal Mint releases a special £5 coin to commemorate the 600th anniversary of the Battle of Agincourt.
  - Five people, all confirmed to be Britons, are drowned after the whale-watching boat Leviathan II sinks off Tofino in British Columbia, Canada.
- 26 October
  - Rachel Treweek, Bishop of Gloucester, becomes the first woman to take her seat as a bishop in the House of Lords.
  - The government suffers a major defeat in the House of Lords, after its plans to cut tax credits are rejected by peers, who vote to delay the measures and compensate those affected in full.
- 29 October
  - A 16-year-old youth is detained by police, after a fellow pupil is stabbed to death at Cults Academy school in Aberdeen.
  - It is projected that the UK population will increase beyond 70,000,000 by 2027, mainly due to an ageing population and net migration.
- 30 October – Shaker Aamer, the last British resident to be held in Guantanamo Bay, lands in the UK, having been detained for thirteen years.
- 31 October – A motorist dies and ten people are taken to hospital with injuries, after a car collides with a bus near West Kilbride in Ayrshire, Scotland.

=== November ===
- 1 November – A temperature of 22.4 °C is recorded in Trawsgoed, Ceredigion in Wales, making it the warmest November day on record in the UK, breaking the previous record set nearly seventy years ago.
- 2 November
  - Archaeologists accidentally discover a well-preserved family burial vault in Gloucester Cathedral.
  - Hundreds of police officers from all over the UK turn out to pay their respects at the funeral of Merseyside Police officer David Phillips at Liverpool Cathedral.
- 4 November – A suspension of flights between the UK and the Egyptian holiday resort of Sharm el-Sheikh leaves many British holidaymakers stranded, following rumours that the Metrojet Flight 9268 on 31 October, in which many Russian tourists died, was caused by a terrorist bomb.
- 5 November – A protest march by masked anti-capitalists in central London on Bonfire Night leads to three Metropolitan Police officers being taken to hospital with injuries. Six police horses are also hurt.
- 6 November – Flights between the UK and Sharm el-Sheikh resume, bringing the stranded British tourists home.
- 10 November – Storm Abigail is the first storm to be officially named by the Met Office. It leaves many travel services disrupted, schools closed, and 20,000 homes without power.
- 11 November – Nathan Matthews is found guilty of the murder of Becky Watts, his teenage stepsister, while his girlfriend, Shauna Hoare, is found guilty of her manslaughter. On 13 November, Justice Dingemans sentences Matthews to life imprisonment with a minimum of 33 years for the murder, and Hoare is sentenced to 17 years for manslaughter.
- 14 November
  - One Briton is confirmed to be among the 129 people killed in a series of coordinated terrorist attacks in Paris the previous day, with fears of a "handful" more to be confirmed.
  - Gatwick's North Terminal is evacuated as a precautionary measure, in light of the terrorist attacks in Paris, after a man is arrested when a suspicious item is found at the airport.
  - The Department for Transport announces that all speed cameras in England currently painted grey will be repainted yellow by the end of October 2016.
  - A family of four are killed after their six-seater light aircraft crashes near Churchinford in Somerset.
- 16 November – The UK joins the rest of Europe in a minutes silence in remembrance of the 129 lives lost, including one Briton, in the Paris terrorist attacks on 13 November.
- 17 November – Prime Minister David Cameron promises the House of Commons a "comprehensive strategy" to win MPs' backing for bombing Islamic State militants in Syria as well as Iraq.
- 18 November
  - Thousands of homes are left without power as Storm Barney rips through parts of the United Kingdom.
  - Energy Secretary Amber Rudd proposes that the UK's coal plants should be phased out by 2025.
- 21 November – Four Britons are believed to be among the seven people killed in a helicopter crash on the Fox Glacier in South Island, New Zealand.
- 23 November – David Cameron holds talks with French President François Hollande about co-operation in the fight against Islamic State.
- 24 November
  - A Scottish National Party motion opposing Trident's renewal is defeated by 330 votes to 64, with most Labour MPs abstaining.
  - Alton Towers confirms that The Smiler rollercoaster crash, that seriously injured five people in June, was caused by human error.
  - British Airways and EasyJet cancel all flights between Sharm el-Sheikh and the UK until January, following the suspected bombing of Metrojet Flight 9268.
- 25 November – Chancellor George Osborne outlines his joint annual Autumn Statement and Spending Review for the financial year ahead, in which he surprisingly announces he is to scrap planned cuts to tax credits and vows to protect police budgets in response to the UK's heightened terror threat.
- 28 November – Grant Shapps quits as Minister of State at the Department for International Development amid claims he failed to act on allegations of bullying following the apparent suicide of a youth activist in September.
- 29 November – In tennis, Great Britain win the Davis Cup for the first time since 1936 after Andy Murray beats Belgium's David Goffin at the final in Ghent, Belgium.
- November – Last sighting in England of a golden eagle (in the Lake District).

=== December ===
- 1 December – A fire damages a bar in Newcastle city centre, and one person, later confirmed as the owner, Brian Sandals, is found burnt to death.
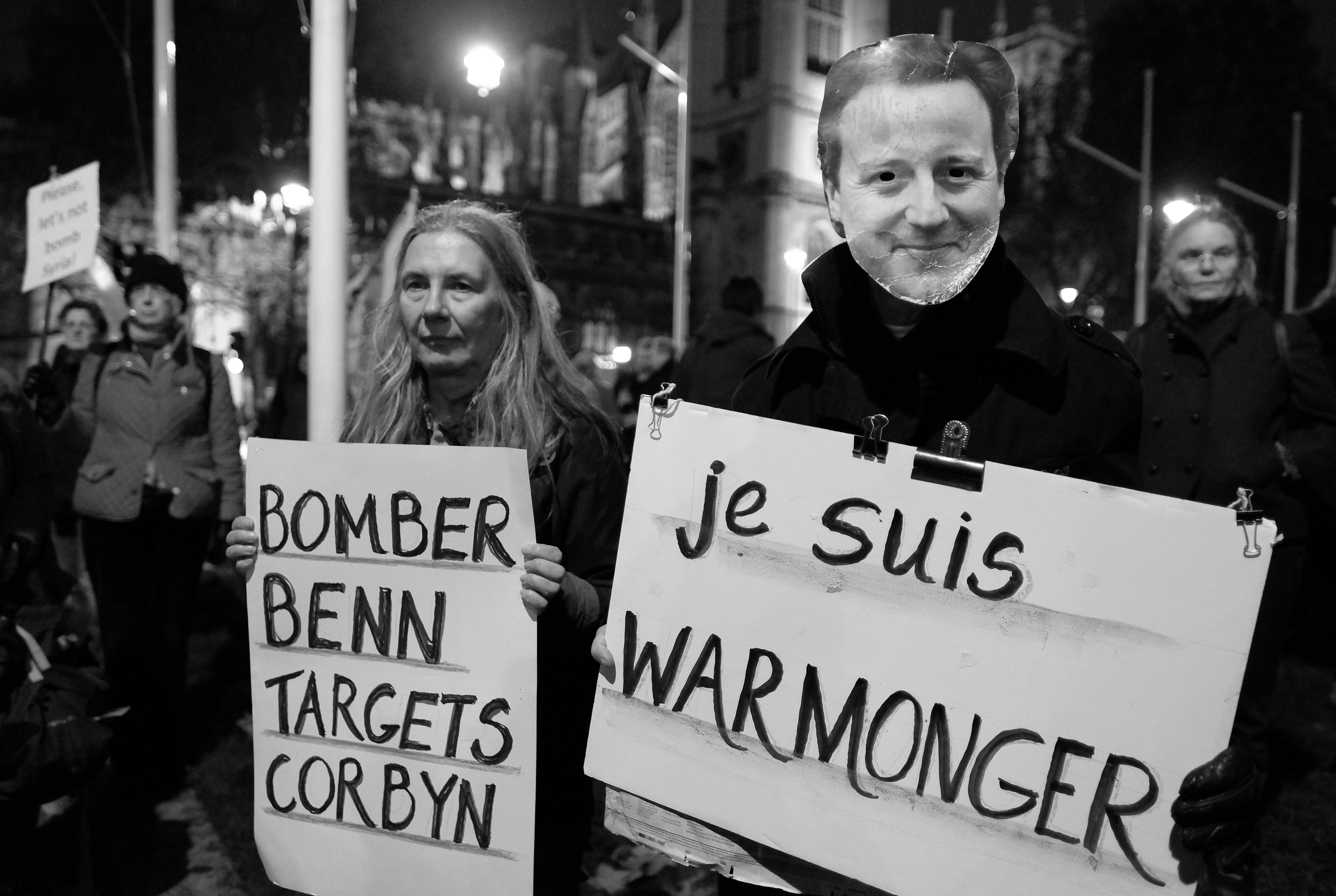
  Protest against air strikes in Syria
- 2 December – MPs vote 397–223 to authorise UK air strikes against Islamic State in Syria.
- 3 December
  - The UK launches its first air strikes over Syria with RAF tornado jets carrying out bombings against Islamic State-controlled oil fields.
  - 2015 Oldham West and Royton by-election: Jim McMahon retains the seat for Labour with an increased majority of 7.3%. The by-election was caused by long-serving MP Michael Meacher's death in October.
- 4 December
  - The Rail Delivery Group announces that rail fares will rise by 1.1% in the new year, in line with current inflation rates.
  - The Forth Road Bridge in Scotland is closed due to structural defects, and the Scottish Transport Minister, Derek Mackay, announces that it will not be reopened until January 2016.
- 5 December
  - A stabbing at Leytonstone tube station in East London, which leaves a man with serious knife injuries, is being treated as a "terrorist incident" according to the Metropolitan Police.
  - Storm Desmond batters the UK with high-speed winds and heavy rain, causing severe disruption. People are evacuated from their homes as flash flooding sweeps through parts of Cumbria, with police declaring a "major incident".
  - Plastic bag use in Tesco stores in England has declined by 80% since a new 5p charge was introduced, data suggests.
- 9 December
  - The Election Court decide that although Liberal Democrat Alistair Carmichael has told a "blatant lie" in a TV interview, it has not been proven beyond reasonable doubt that he had committed an "illegal practice" that would invalidate his election.
  - MPs debate whether Republican presidential candidate Donald Trump should be banned from entering the UK after an online petition receives an excess of 100,000 signatures. This follows Trump making a statement about banning all Muslims from entering the United States, and claims he made that parts of London are "so radicalised the police are afraid for their lives".
  - Chancellor George Osborne announces a £50,000,000 fund for families and businesses hit by floods in Cumbria and Lancashire in the wake of Storm Desmond.
- 10 December – The government announces that any decisions on whether to allow a new runway at Heathrow or Gatwick will not be announced until summer 2016.
- 14 December – A "huge rise" is reported in the number of newborn babies in England who are subject to care proceedings, with 2,018 in 2013 compared to 802 in 2008.
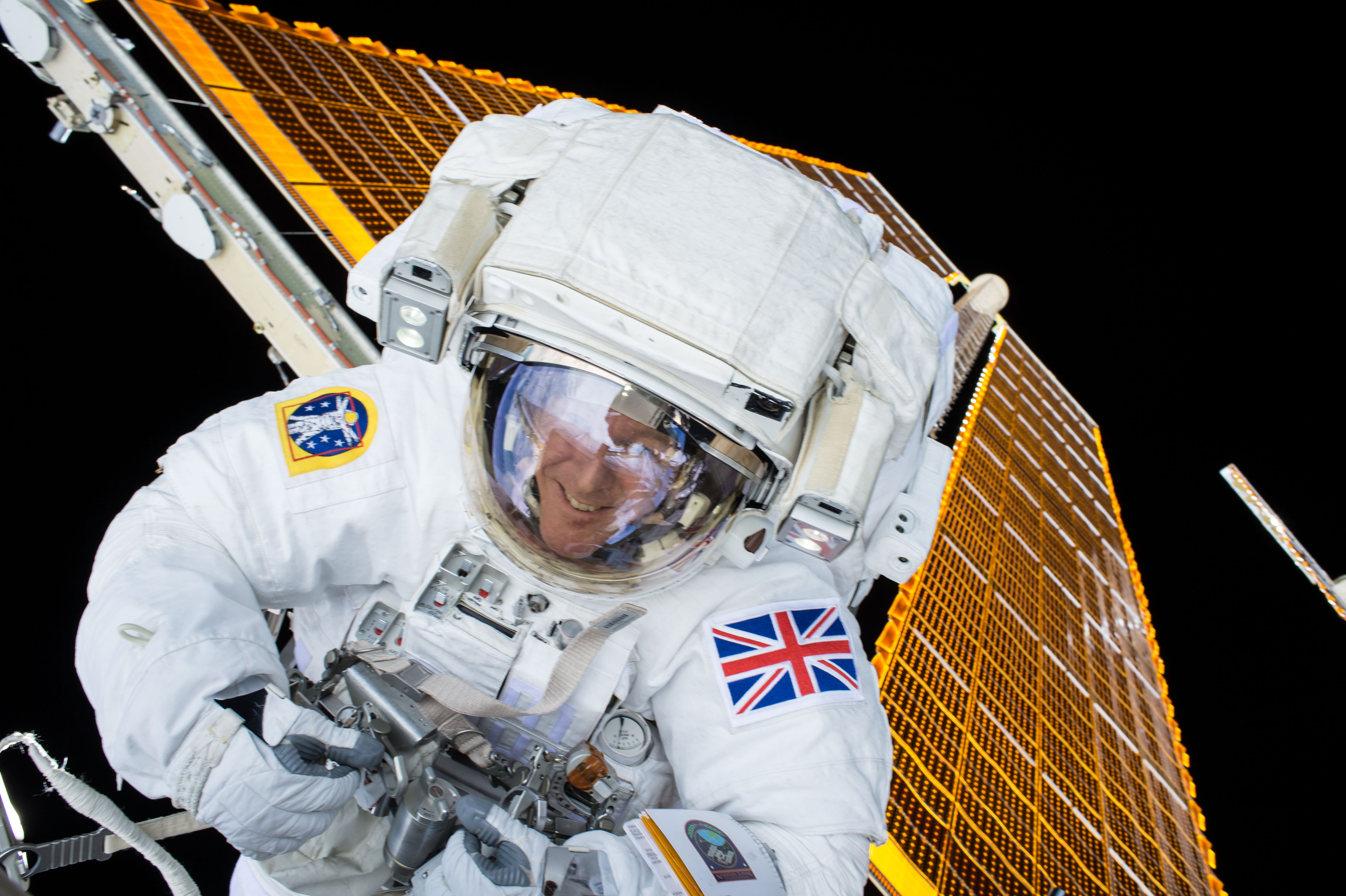
  Tim Peake conducting repairs on the International Space Station a few weeks after his arrival
- 15 December – British astronaut Tim Peake becomes the first Briton under the banner of the European Space Agency to set foot on the International Space Station.
- 18 December
  - The United Kingdom's last deep coal mine, Kellingley Colliery at Beal, North Yorkshire, closes; marking the end of the era of deep-pit coal mining in the UK.
  - Energy firm npower is fined £26,000,000 over billing and complaint failures after it sent out incorrect bills and failed to deal with complaints, according to Ofgem.
- 25 December – Storm Eva causes more intensive flooding in northern England, with homes evacuated in Lancashire and Yorkshire, and rivers overflowing in Manchester and Leeds.
- 29 December – An 81-year-old woman is shot dead by a fellow octogenarian resident at the De La Mer House care home in Essex.
- 30 December
  - A husband and wife who plotted terror attacks in the Underground and Westfield shopping centre, nicknamed the "silent bomber" couple, are jailed for a minimum of 27 and 25 years.
  - Hundreds of homes are evacuated and thousands are left without power in Scotland and Northern Ireland as Storm Frank brings torrential rain and gales. More than a hundred flood warnings are issued across England, Wales and Scotland.
- 31 December
  - The New Year honours list is announced, with new knights, dames, MBEs and OBEs awarded for notable contributions to society.
  - More than 1,700 same-sex couples have married in the first year after Scotland became the seventeenth country in the world to legalise same-sex marriage.

=== Undated ===
- Ofqual initiates reversion of GCE Advanced Level testing from modular assessment to two-year terminal examinations; AS-levels will no longer count towards a subsequent A-level.

== Publications ==
- Frances Hardinge's young adult fantasy novel The Lie Tree, overall winner of the 2015 Costa Book Awards.
- Paula Hawkins' novel The Girl on the Train.
- E. L. James' novel Grey: Fifty Shades of Grey as Told by Christian.
- Jamie Oliver's cookbook Everyday Super Food.
- Terry Pratchett's posthumous novel The Shepherd's Crown.
- Zoe Sugg's novel Girl Online: On Tour.
- David Walliams' children's novel Grandpa's Great Escape.

== Births ==
=== March ===
- 7 March – Bodhana Sivanandan, chess grandmaster

=== May ===
- 2 May – Princess Charlotte

== Deaths ==
=== January ===
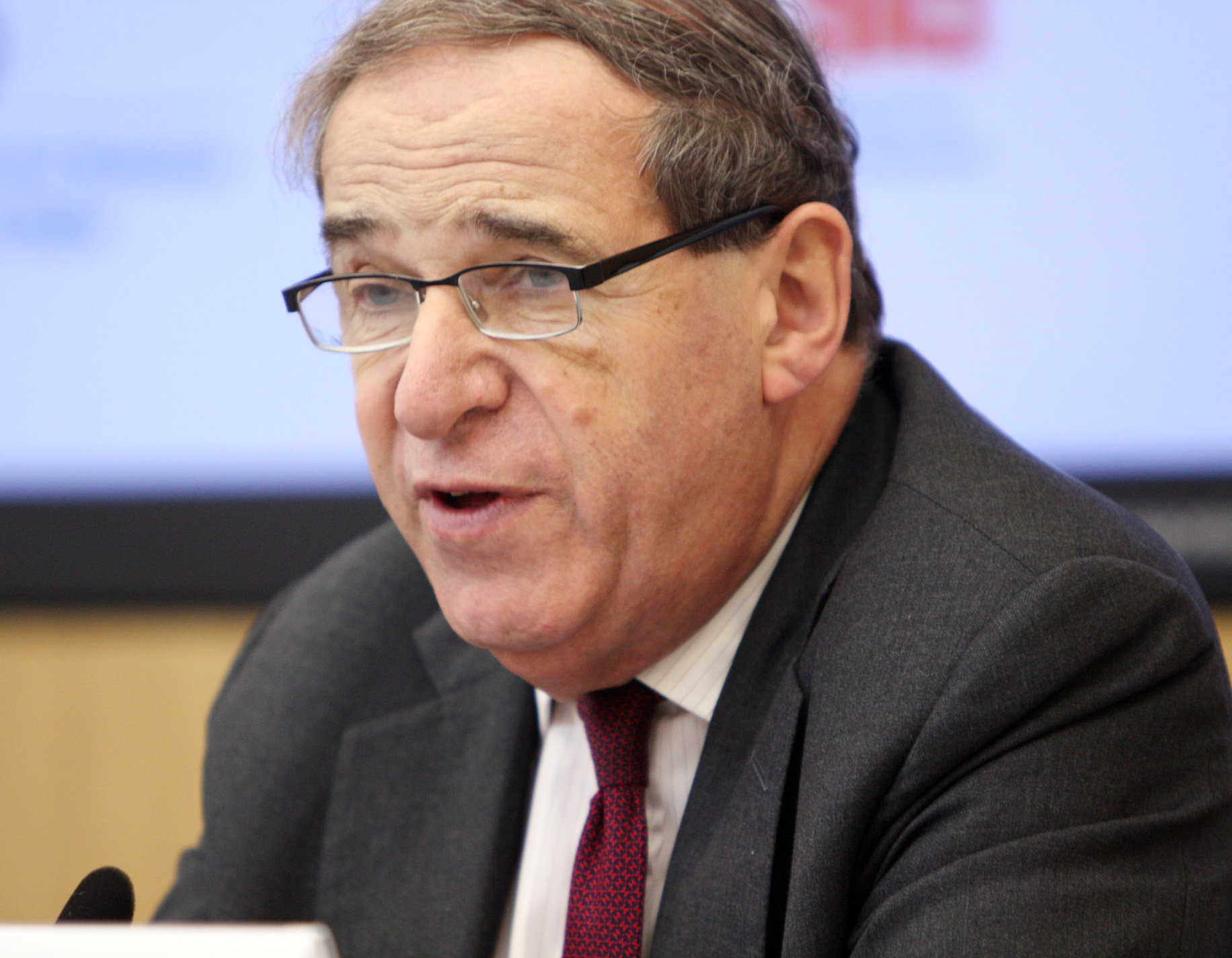
Leon Brittan (1939–2015) in 2011

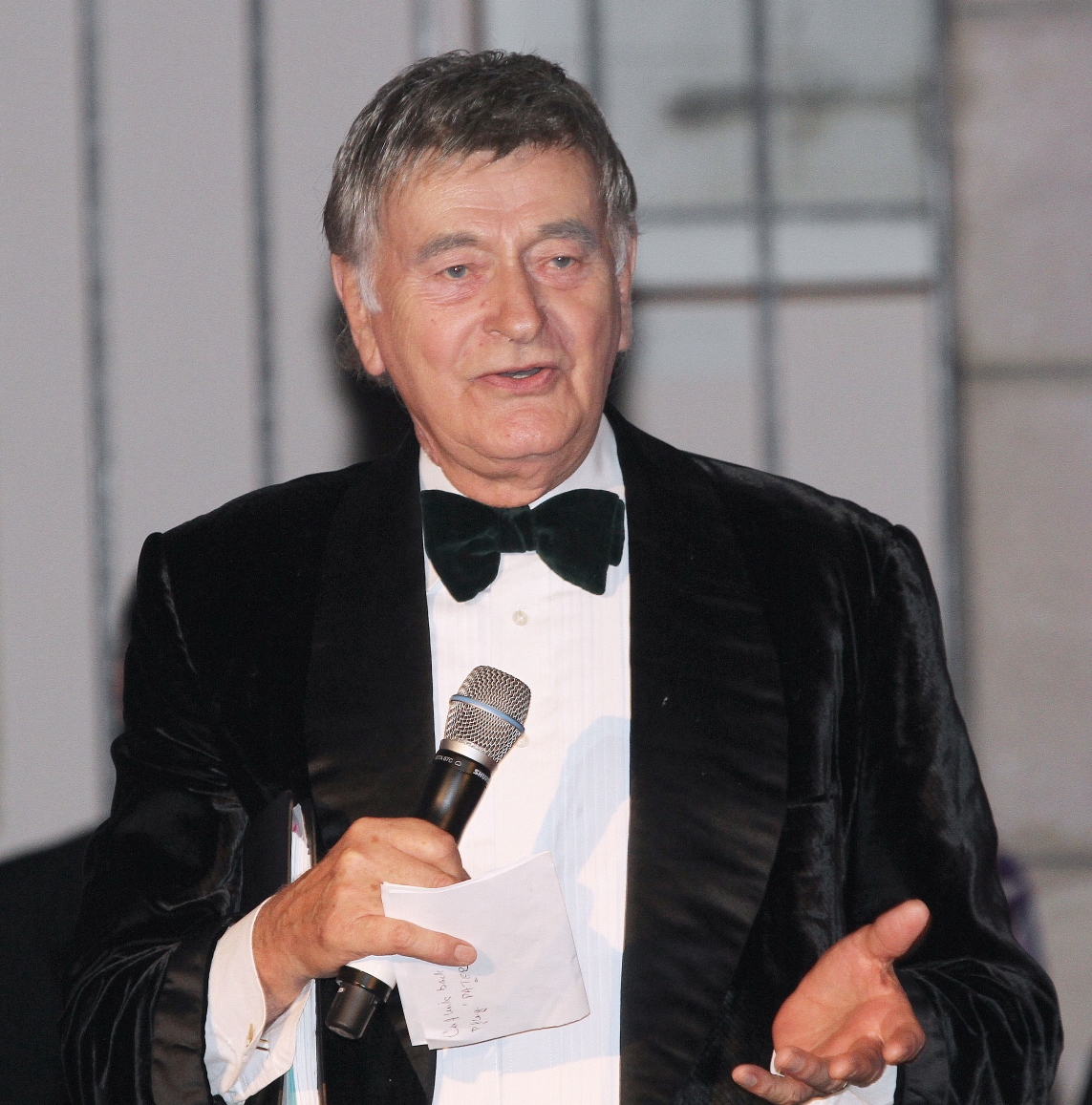
Barrie Ingham (1932–2015) in 2011

- 1 January
  - Barbara Atkinson, 88, actress.
  - Matthew Cogley, 30, musician and songwriter (Failsafe).
  - Fiona Cumming, 77, actress and director (Doctor Who).
- 2 January
  - Danny Dunton, 90, speedway rider and promoter.
  - Bob Gilmore, 53, musicologist.
  - Roger Kitter, 64, actor ('Allo 'Allo!)
  - Derek Minter, 82, Grand Prix motorcycle and short-circuit road racer.
- 3 January – Terence Ranger, 85, historian of Africa.
- 4 January
  - John McPhee, 77, footballer (Blackpool, Motherwell).
  - Bernard Williams, 72, film producer (A Clockwork Orange, Ragtime, Star Trek Generations).
- 5 January
  - Khan Bonfils, 42, actor (Star Wars: Episode I – The Phantom Menace, Batman Begins, Skyfall).
  - Albert Firth, 77, rugby league footballer (Wakefield Trinity).
  - Ken Hale, 75, football player and manager.
  - Anthony Ledwith, 81, chemist.
  - Geoff Truett, 79, footballer (Crystal Palace).
- 6 January
  - Gene Kemp, 88, children's author (The Turbulent Term of Tyke Tiler).
  - Sir Basil John Mason, 91, meteorologist.
  - Lance Percival, 81, actor and comedian.
- 7 January
  - Michael Fisher, 68, solicitor.
  - Nancy Thomas, 96, television producer (Monitor).
- 8 January
  - Peter Hill, 83, footballer (Coventry City).
  - Richard Meade, 76, Olympic equestrian.
  - Ray McFall, 88, former The Cavern Club owner.
- 10 January
  - Brian Clemens, 83, screenwriter (Dr. Jekyll and Sister Hyde) and television producer (The Avengers).
  - Roger Wosahlo, 67, footballer (Peterborough).
- 11 January
  - Chic Littlewood, 84, New Zealand television personality.
  - Albert McPherson, 87, footballer (Walsall) and coach (West Bromwich Albion).
- 12 January
  - John Bayley, 89, literary critic and writer.
  - Steve Gold, 58, computer journalist.
  - Paul Morgan, 40, rugby union and rugby league footballer.
- 13 January
  - Sir Jack Hayward, 91, businessman.
  - Mike Marqusee, 61, writer and activist.
  - Ronnie Ronalde, 91, music hall singer and siffleur.
  - Trevor Ward-Davies, 70, bassist (Dave Dee, Dozy, Beaky, Mick & Tich).
- 14 January
  - Danny Malloy, 84, footballer (Cardiff City, Dundee).
  - Darren Shahlavi, 42, actor (Arrow, Night at the Museum, Watchmen) and martial artist.
- 15 January
  - Ena Baxter, 90, food manufacturer (Baxters).
  - Archibald Kennedy, 8th Marquess of Ailsa, 58, peer, hereditary chief of Clan Kennedy.
  - Ethel Lang, 114, last person living in the UK who was born in the reign of Queen Victoria.
- 16 January
  - Bill Dodd, 78, footballer.
  - Ted Harrison, 88, painter.
  - Tony Ridler, 59, darts player.
- 17 January
  - Ken Furphy, 83, footballer and manager.
  - Louis Martin, 78, weightlifter, Olympic silver (1964) and bronze (1960) medalist.
  - Terence Miller, 96, palaeontologist.
- 18 January – June Randall, 87, British script supervisor (The Spy Who Loved Me, A Clockwork Orange, The Shining).
- 19 January
  - Anne Kirkbride, 60, actress (Coronation Street).
  - Bob Symes, 90, inventor and television presenter.
- 21 January
  - Leon Brittan, 75, politician, Home Secretary (1983–85).
  - Martin Honeysett, 71, cartoonist and illustrator.
  - Frank Hooley, 91, politician, MP for Sheffield Heeley (1966–1970, 1974–1983).
  - Pauline Yates, 85, actress (The Fall and Rise of Reginald Perrin).
- 22 January
  - Douglas Cromb, 84, football administrator (Hibernian).
  - Joan Hinde, 81, trumpeter and entertainer.
- 23 January – Barrie Ingham, 82, actor (The Great Mouse Detective, Doctor Who, A Challenge for Robin Hood).
- 24 January
  - Peter Bridges, 89, Anglican priest, Archdeacon of Southend (1972–1977), Coventry (1977–1983) and Warwick (1983–1990).
  - Frances Lennon, 102, artist.
  - Vic Groves, 82, footballer.
- 25 January
  - Sir Robert Atkinson, 98, businessman and naval officer.
  - Pauline Fisk, 66. author.
  - Ian Towers, 74, footballer (Burnley, Oldham Athletic).
- 26 January – Lee Spick, 34, snooker player.
- 27 January
  - Roger Cowley, 75, physicist.
  - David Landau, 67, journalist and newspaper editor (Haaretz).
  - Margot Moir, 55, singer (The Moir Sisters).
- 28 January
  - Francis Bennion, 92, lawyer.
  - Tommie Manderson, 102, make-up artist (An Age of Kings, Alien, The Killing Fields).
  - Beric Morley, 71, architectural historian.
  - Katharine Worth, 92, drama academic.
- 29 January
  - Terry Hollindrake, 80, rugby league player.
  - Noel Lister, 87, businessman (MFI).
  - Danny McCulloch, 69, bassist (The Animals)
  - Derek S. Pugh, 84, psychologist and business theorist.
  - Derek Robertson, 65, footballer (St Johnstone).
- 30 January
  - Johnny Goodman, 87, television producer.
  - Harold Hassall, 85, footballer (Bolton Wanderers).
  - John Hopkins, 78, photographer, activist and promoter (Notting Hill Carnival, International Times).
  - Howard Norris, 80, rugby union player (Wales national union team, British and Irish Lions).
  - Geraldine McEwan, 82, actress (Agatha Christie's Marple).

=== February ===
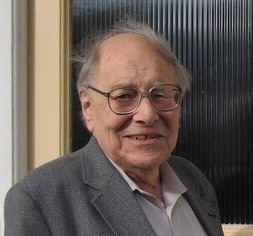
Jeffrey Segal (1920–2015) in 2008

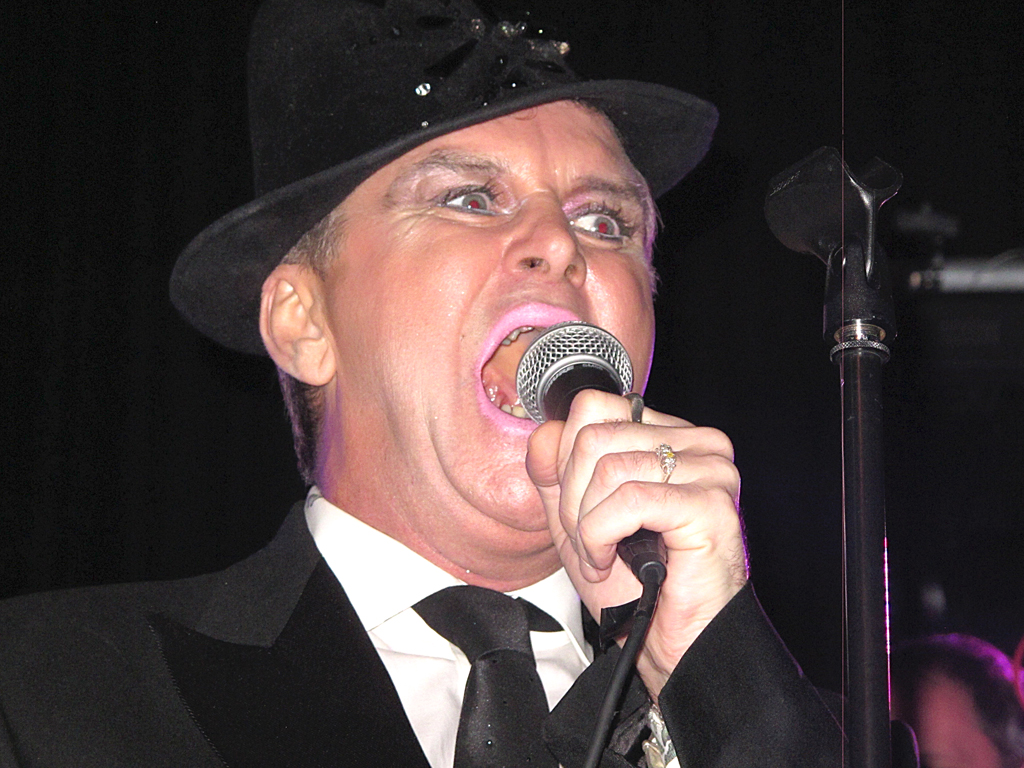
Steve Strange (1959–2015), the lead singer of Visage in 2014

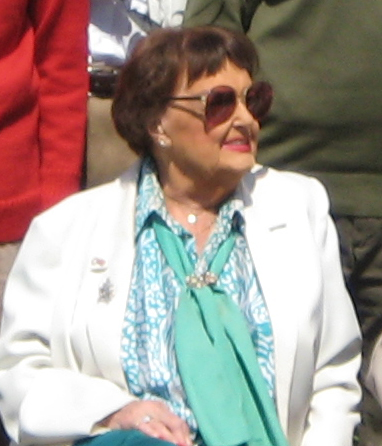
Pamela Cundell (1920–2015) in 2011

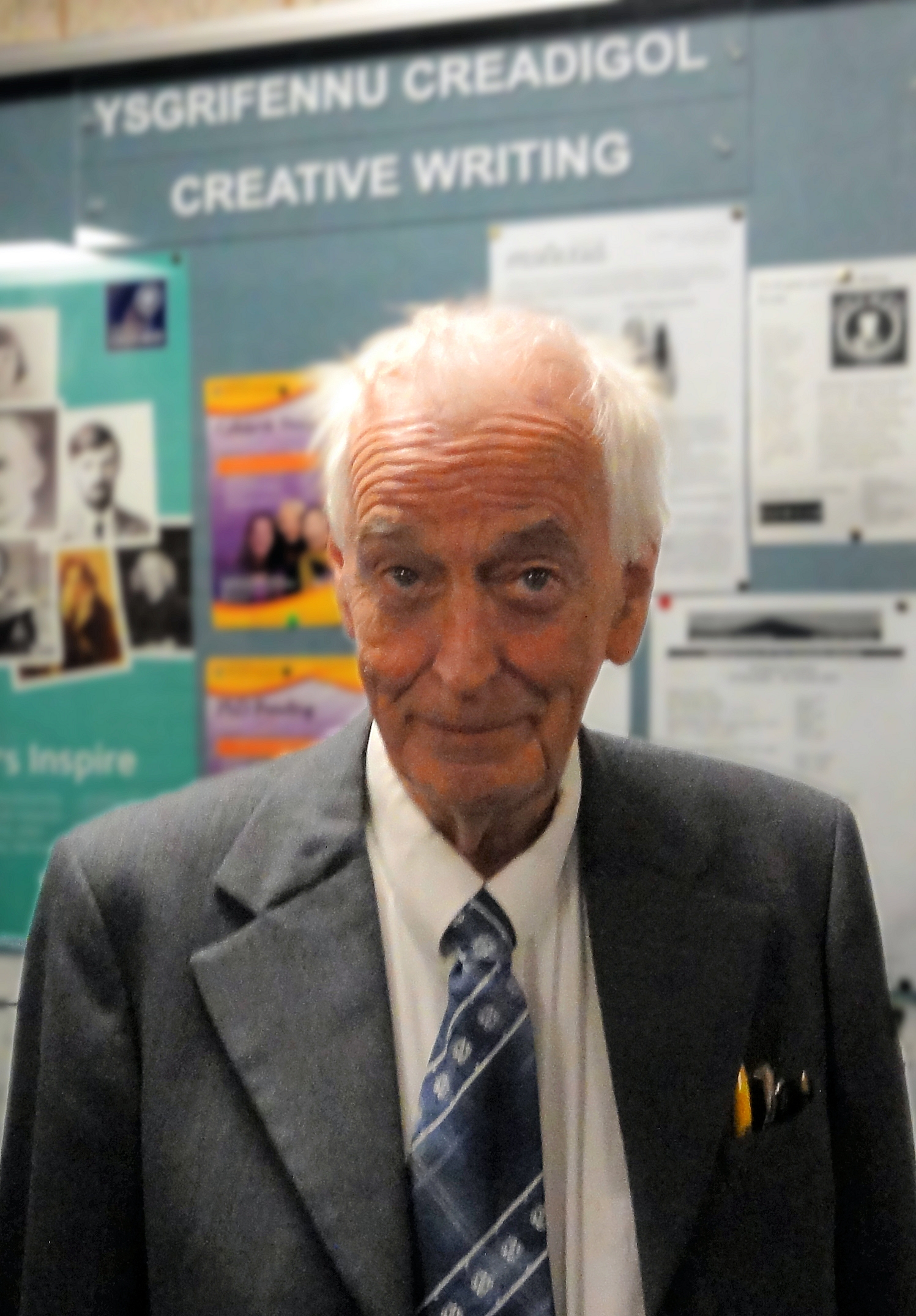
John Davies (1938–2015)

- 1 February
  - Sir Douglas Hague, 88, economist.
  - Gordon Murray, 87, politician.
  - Beryl Platt, Baroness Platt of Writtle, 91, engineer and politician.
  - Michael Saward, 82, Anglican priest and hymnist.
  - Marie-José Villiers, 98, WWII spy and countess.
- 2 February
  - Roy Little, 83, footballer (Manchester City).
  - Johnny Campbell, 86, footballer (Gateshead).
  - Sandra Chalmers, 74, broadcaster (Woman's Hour).
  - Ken Hawkes, 81, footballer (Luton Town).
- 3 February – Sir Martin Gilbert, 78, historian and biographer, member of the Iraq Inquiry panel.
- 4 February
  - Richard Bonehill, 67, actor and stuntman (Doctor Who, Return of the Jedi).
  - Martin Green, 82, writer and publisher.
- 5 February
  - Sir Gordon Linacre, 94, newspaper executive and bomber pilot.
  - Jeffrey Segal, 94, actor (Fawlty Towers, Z-Cars).
- 6 February – Carl Cunningham-Cole, ceramic artist.
- 7 February
  - Robert Gavron, Baron Gavron, 84, businessman and philanthropist, Labour life peer.
  - Brian Reynolds, 82, cricketer (Northamptonshire).
- 8 February
  - Stan Cowan, 83, rugby league player (Hull).
  - John Hart, 93, ballet dancer and artistic director (Ballet West).
  - Andrew Rosenfeld, 52, businessman.
  - Sir David Watson, 65, academic and educationalist (University of Oxford).
- 9 February
  - Roy Harris, 83, linguist.
  - Drew McDonald, 59, professional wrestler.
  - Nicholas Mackintosh, 79, experimental psychologist.
  - Nick Sharkey, 71, footballer (Sunderland).
- 10 February
  - Sir Noel Davies, 81, chief executive (Vickers).
  - John Fox, 90, composer and conductor.
  - Sir William Lawrence, 5th Baronet, 60, peer.
  - Tom McQueen, 85, footballer (Accrington Stanley, Hibernian).
  - Anne Naysmith, 77, concert pianist.
- 11 February
  - Christopher Greener, 71, basketball player and actor.
  - Gus Moffat, 66, football player and coach.
- 12 February
  - Anthony Low, 87, historian.
  - Oliver Rackham, 75, landscape ecologist.
  - Steve Strange, 55, musician (Visage).
  - Mike Thresh, 84, plant pathologist.
- 13 February
  - John McCabe, 75, composer and pianist.
  - Dan Tunstall Pedoe, 75, cardiologist.
  - Hugh Walters, 75, actor.
- 14 February
  - Pamela Cundell, 95, actress (Dad's Army, EastEnders, A Fantastic Fear of Everything).
  - Sheila Girling, 90, British artist.
  - John D. Hargreaves, 91, historian.
  - Alan Howard, 77, actor.
  - Richard Perham, 77, molecular biologist.
- 15 February
  - Eileen Essell, 92, actress.
  - John Treadgold, 83, Anglican priest, Dean of Chichester (1989–2001).
- 16 February
  - Gavin Clark, 46, singer (UNKLE, Clayhill).
  - John Davies, 76, historian.
  - Brett Ewins, 59, comic book artist (Judge Dredd, 2000 AD).
  - Geoff Morris, 66, footballer (Walsall).
  - Sir Robert Wade-Gery, 85, diplomat, High Commissioner to India (1982–1987).
- 17 February – George Mackie, Baron Mackie of Benshie, 95, politician, Liberal Democrat life peer.
- 18 February – Allan Beard, 95, civil servant. (death announced on this date)
- 19 February – Dennis Davis, 88, mountaineer.
- 20 February – Sandy Whitelaw, 84, film producer and executive.
- 21 February
  - Meredydd Evans, 95, professor, musician and television producer.
  - Sir Anthony Grabham, 84, surgeon and army officer.
  - John Knapp-Fisher, 83, painter.
  - Christopher Price, 83, politician, MP for Birmingham Perry Barr (1966–1970) and Lewisham West (1974–1983).
  - Daniel Topolski, 69, rowing coach and commentator.
- 22 February – Roger Cecil, 72, painter.
- 23 February
  - James Aldridge, 96, writer (The Sea Eagle).
  - David Freeman, 86, solicitor.
  - Andy King, 72, footballer (Kilmarnock F.C.).
  - Gerald Lockwood, 87, English rugby league player.
  - John Rowlands, 76, author and novelist.
  - Dave Williams, 72, football player and coach (Newport County).
- 24 February
  - Joseph Beltrami, 83, lawyer.
  - Geoffrey Owen Whittaker, 83, civil servant, Governor of Anguilla (1987–1989).
- 25 February
  - Marie Cathcart, Countess Cathcart, 91, peeress
  - Terry Gill, 75, actor ("Crocodile" Dundee, Prisoner (TV series), The Flying Doctors).
  - Chris Rainbow, 68, rock musician (The Alan Parsons Project).
  - Raymond Smallman, 85, metallurgist.
  - Victor Watson, 86, businessman and philanthropist
- 26 February
  - Bob Braithwaite, 89, Olympian trap shooter.
  - Brian Cumby, 64, British shipwright.
  - Sheppard Frere, 98, historian and archaeologist.
  - Victor Watson, 86, executive (Waddingtons).
- 27 February
  - Patrick Whitefield, 66, permaculturist.
  - Joanne Woollard, film art director (Gravity).
- 28 February
  - Clifford Edmund Bosworth, 86, oriental historian.
  - Sarah Foot, 75, journalist and author.

=== March ===
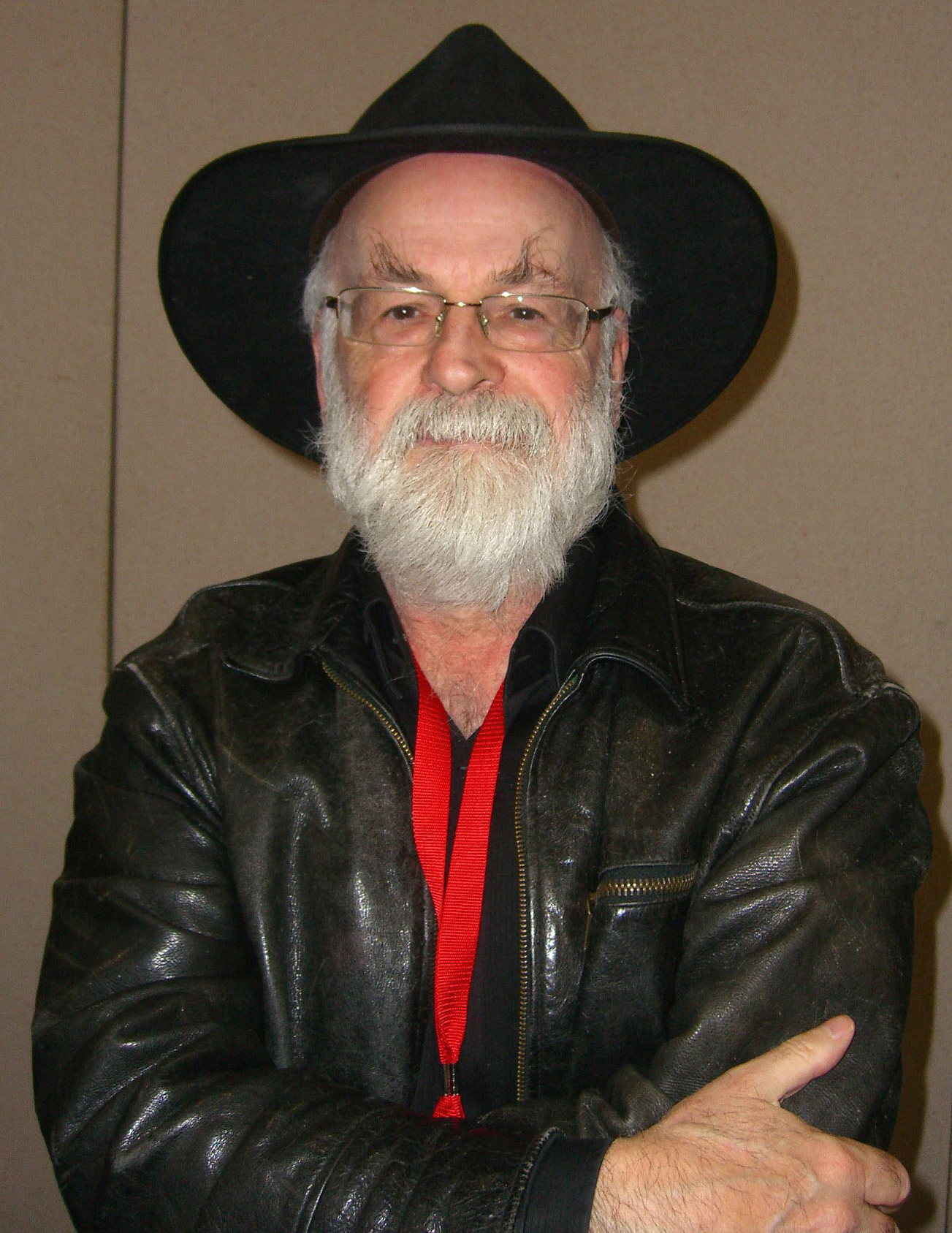
Terry Pratchett (1948–2015), the author of the acclaimed Discworld series

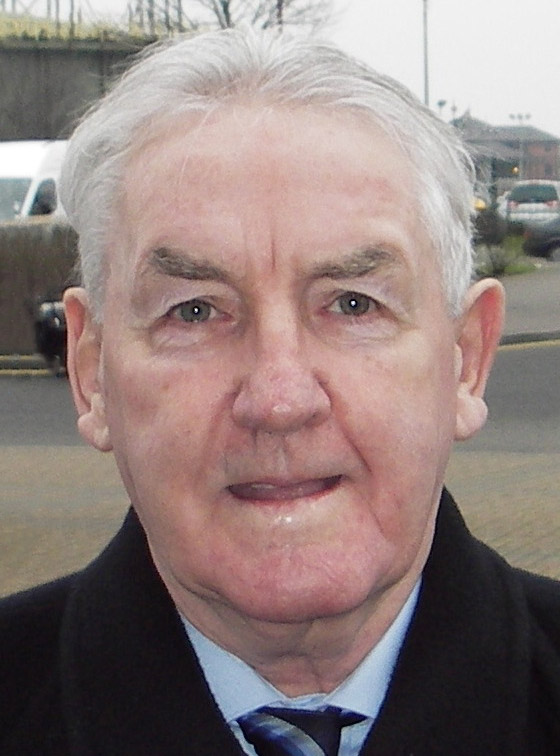
Dave Mackay (1934–2015) in 2006

Suzanne Farrington (centre) (1933–2015) in 1950

- 1 March
  - Malcolm Bennett, 56, poet and author.
  - William Bowyer, 88, painter.
  - Suzanne Farrington, 81, daughter of Vivien Leigh.
  - Stuart McGrady, 29, footballer (Ayr United, Queen's Park).
  - Matthew Young, 70, civil servant and executive (Panini Group).
- 2 March
  - Dennis Barker, 85, journalist.
  - Leslie Chamberlain, 81, English rugby league footballer.
  - Dave Mackay, 80, football player and manager (Tottenham Hotspur, Derby County).
  - Jem Marsh, 84, automotive engineer, co-founder of Marcos Engineering.
  - Mal Peet, 67, author and illustrator.
- 3 March
  - Ernest Braun, 89, academic and author.
  - Denis Coe, 86, politician, MP for Middleton and Prestwich (1966–1970).
  - Roy McCrohan, 84, footballer (Norwich City).
- 4 March
  - Ray Hatton, 83, author.
  - John Simopoulos, 91, philosopher.
- 6 March
  - Mick Clark, 78, rugby league player (Leeds).
  - Osi Rhys Osmond, painter and television presenter.
- 7 March – Derek Day, 87, diplomat, Ambassador to Ethiopia (1975–1978) and High Commissioner to Canada (1984–1987).
- 9 March – James Molyneaux, Baron Molyneaux of Killead, 94, Northern Irish Unionist politician.
- 10 March
  - Vic Harris, 69, snooker player.
  - Kenneth Smales, 87, cricketer and football administrator.
  - Stuart Wagstaff, 90, entertainer.
  - John Howard Wilson, 85, rugby union player.
- 11 March
  - Marni Hodgkin, 97, book editor.
  - Christopher Morris, 72, accountant.
  - Harri Pritchard Jones, 81, writer, critic, and psychiatrist.
- 12 March
  - Geoff Coffin, 90, footballer (Chester City).
  - Jim Rhodes, 69, golf player.
  - Terry Pratchett, 66, author (Discworld series).
  - Alice Teichova, 94, economic historian.
  - Sir Jerry Wiggin, 78, politician, MP for Weston-super-Mare (1969–1997).
- 13 March
  - Lilian Bader, 97, WAAF aircraftwoman and teacher.
  - Jenifer Haselgrove, 84, physicist and computer scientist.
  - Jeff Rees, 94, WWII RAF officer.
  - Vincent Wong, 87, British actor (Doctor Who, James Bond, Batman)
- 14 March
  - L. S. Cousins, 72, scholar in Buddhist studies.
  - Rosalind Dallas, 66, television graphic designer.
  - Milton Huddart, 54, English rugby league footballer (Whitehaven).
- 15 March
  - Robert Clatworthy, 87, sculptor.
  - Fritz Wegner, 90, illustrator.
- 16 March
  - Stuart Croft, 45, filmmaker and educator.
  - Andy Fraser, 62, musician (John Mayall & the Bluesbreakers, Free) and songwriter ("All Right Now", "Every Kinda People").
- 17 March – Bob Appleyard, 90, cricketer (Yorkshire, national team).
- 18 March – Shaw Taylor, 90, actor and television presenter.
- 19 March
  - David Harrison, 88, zoologist (Harrison Institute).
  - Peter Katin, 84, pianist.
  - Joy Tamblin, 89, WRAF officer.
- 20 March
  - Mary Clarke, 91, dance critic.
  - Eddie Mulheron, 72, footballer (Clyde, Durban United).
- 21 March
  - John Dymoke, 88, noble, Queen's Champion.
  - John Walter Guerrier Lund, 102, psychologist.
  - Sir Hal Miller, 86, politician, Member of Parliament (1974–1992).
  - Sir James Spicer, 89, politician, MP for West Dorset (1974–1997).
  - Jackie Trent, 74, singer-songwriter and actress.
  - Robert Williams, 89, chemist.
- 22 March
  - Derek Chinnery, 89, radio controller (BBC Radio 1).
  - Anthony Garner, 88, political organiser.
  - Helen Landis, 92, singer and actress.
- 23 March
  - Lil' Chris, 24, singer-songwriter, actor, and television personality.
  - Roy Douglas, 107, composer.
- 24 March
  - Ian Isles, 96, WWII army officer and actuary.
  - R. Geraint Gruffydd, 86, celtist.
- 25 March
  - Martyn Goff, 91, bookseller, administrator of the Man Booker Prize.
  - Jimmy McGill (footballer, born 1946), 68, footballer (Huddersfield Town, Hull City).
  - Jeannette Obstoj, 65, lyricist (Break Every Rule).
  - Allen Sheppard, Baron Sheppard of Didgemere, 82, industrialist and politician.
  - Ron Suart, 94, football player and manager (Chelsea).
- 26 March
  - Anne Bannister, 78, psychotherapist.
  - Albert Irvin, 92, abstract artist.
  - Ian Moir, 71, footballer (Manchester United, Wrexham).
  - John Renbourn, 70, guitarist (Pentangle).
- 27 March
  - Pauline Brockless, 85, opera singer.
  - Anthony Scrivener, lawyer.
- 28 March
  - Joseph Cassidy, 60, Anglican priest and academic, Principal of St Chad's College.
  - Denis Eadie, 98, WWII army officer.
  - Amos Ford, 98, forester.
  - Josie Jones, 57, singer (The Mighty Wah!).
  - Ronald Stevenson, 87, composer and pianist.
- 29 March
  - Romany Bain, 91, show-business journalist.
  - Gerry Hardstaff, 75, cricket player.
  - John Sheppard, 93, car designer.
  - Peter Tarsey, 77, Olympic diver (1956).
- 30 March – Trevor Williams, 76, plant geneticist.
- 31 March
  - Ricky Marsh, 88, journalist.
  - Anthony Saxton, 80, advertising executive.
  - Dalibor Vesely, 79, architectural historian.

=== April ===
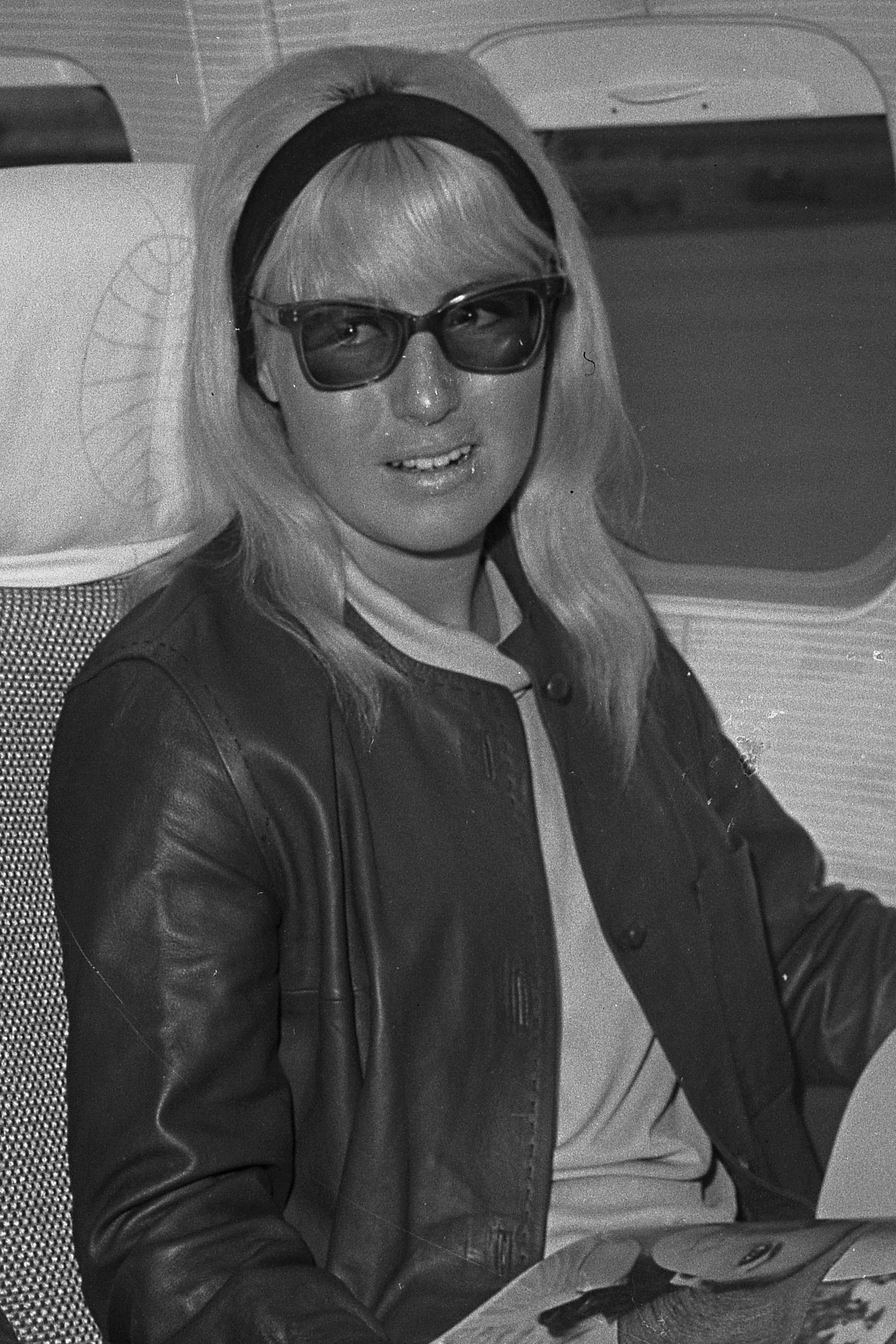
Cynthia Lennon (1939–2015) in 1964

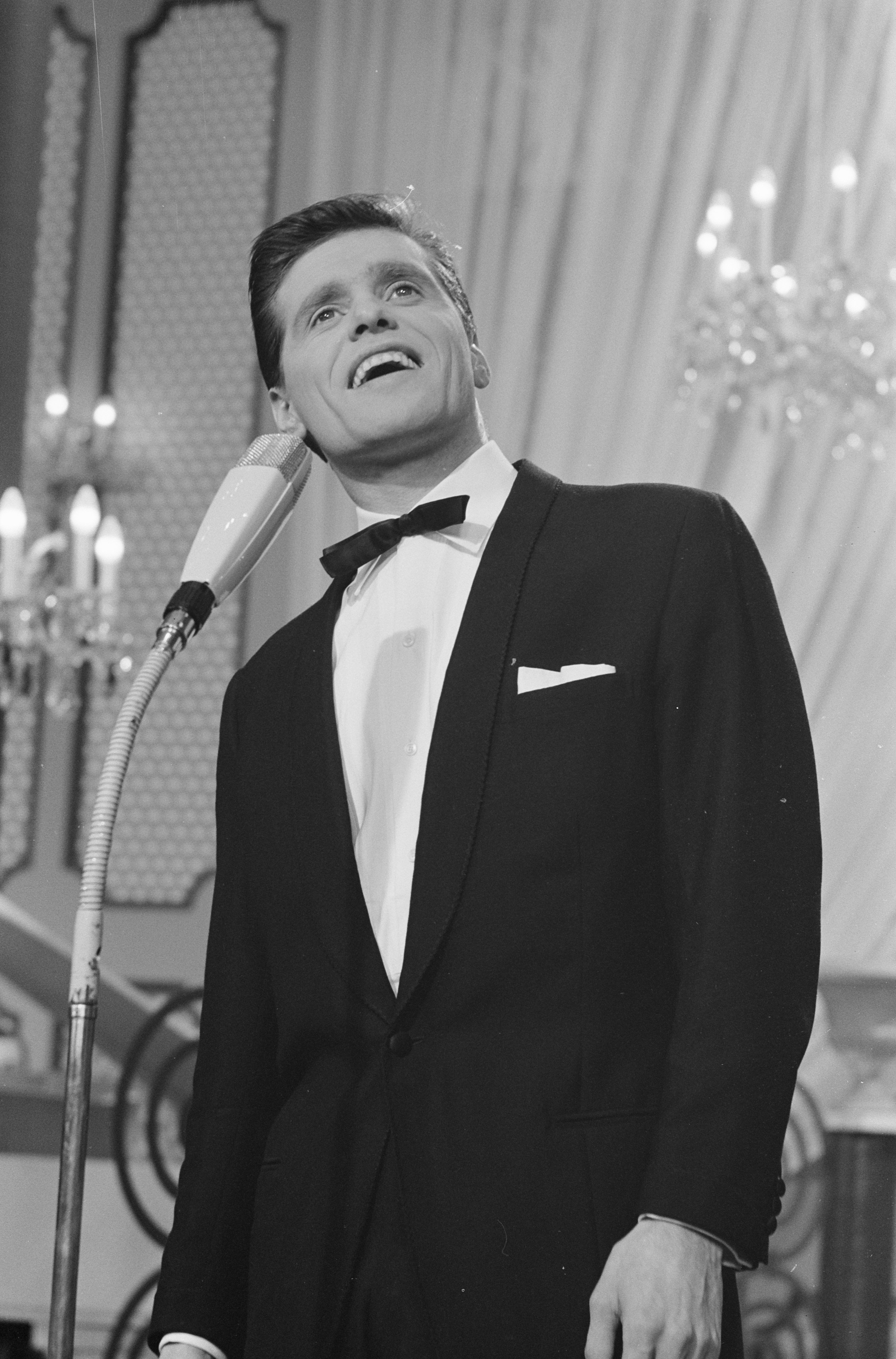
Ronnie Carroll (1934–2015), at the Eurovision Song Contest in 1962

- 1 April
  - Cynthia Lennon, 75, wife of John Lennon (1962–1968).
  - Dave Ball, 65, musician (Procol Harum).
- 2 April
  - Hayley Okines, 17, progeria campaigner.
  - Dennis Marks, 66, television producer and music director.
  - Eugene Vielle, 101, air force officer and inventor.
- 3 April
  - Michael Birkett, 2nd Baron Birkett, 85, hereditary peer and film producer.
  - Nigel Boocock, 77, speedway rider.
  - Andrew Porter, 86, music critic.
  - Chris Plumridge, 70, golf writer.
  - Christopher Reynolds, 92, linguist.
  - Robert Rietti, 92, actor.
- 4 April
  - Bill Ellerington, 91, footballer (Southampton).
  - Sir John Read, 97, executive.
- 5 April
  - Maurice Fenner, 86, cricketer.
  - Tony Hutton, 82, Royal Navy officer.
  - Sargy Mann, 77, painter.
  - Louis Miles Muggleton, 92, physicist.
- 6 April
  - Dave Ulliott, 61, professional poker player.
  - Alan Wilson, 94, cricketer (Lancashire County Cricket Club).
- 7 April
  - Tom Coyne, 84, news broadcaster and television presenter (Top Gear).
  - Harry Dowd, 76, footballer (Manchester City).
  - Dickie Owen, 88, actor (Zulu).
  - Donald Smith, 81, cricket player (Cheshire).
  - Janet Turner, 78, architectural lighting designer.
- 8 April
  - Graham Howarth, 99, entomologist.
  - Billy Ronson, 58, footballer.
  - Ion Trewin, 71, editor, publisher and author.
- 9 April
  - Alexander Dalgarno, 87, physicist.
  - Moira Gemmill, 55, designer.
- 10 April
  - Ronald Hambleton, 97, broadcaster and music critic (Toronto Star).
  - Margaret Rule, 86, archaeologist.
- 11 April
  - Guy Hannen, 90, WWII army officer and auctioneer.
  - Peter Jones, 95, WWII army officer.
  - Sheila Kitzinger, 86, natural childbirth activist.
  - Viv Nicholson, 79, football pools winner.
- 12 April
  - Bill Etches, 93, WWII army officer (St Nazaire Raid).
  - Doug Gregory, 92, Royal Air Force officer and stunt pilot.
- 13 April
  - Ronnie Carroll, 80, singer and political candidate.
  - Tony Eldridge, 91, Royal Navy officer (Chariot manned torpedo).
  - Claire Gordon, 74, actress (Konga, Beat Girl).
  - Rex Robinson, 89, actor (Doctor Who, Yes Minister, Only Fools and Horses).
- 14 April
  - Gordon Preston, 89, mathematician.
  - Kathrine Sorley Walker, 95, ballet critic.
- 15 April
  - Joseph A. Bennett, 44, actor.
  - Margaret Harrison, 96, peace campaigner.
- 16 April – Tommy Preston, 82, footballer (Hibernian).
- 17 April
  - Steve Beck, 58, executive, chairman of York City F.C. (2003–2004).
  - Brian Couzens, 82, music industry executive (Chandos Records).
  - Peter Graham, 60, cricketer.
  - Keith Shackleton, 92, painter and television presenter.
- 18 April – Sir Christopher Alan Bayly, 69, historian.
- 19 April
  - Sir Raymond Carr, 96, historian.
  - Margot Duke, Marchioness of Reading, 96, British aristocrat.
  - Tom McCabe, 60, politician, Minister for Finance and Public Service Reform (2004–2007).
  - Michael J. D. Powell, 78, mathematician.
- 20 April
  - Tommy Graham, 72, politician.
  - Roy Mason, 91, politician.
  - Peter Howell, 95, actor (Emergency – Ward 10, The Lord of the Rings, The Prisoner).
- 21 April
  - Derek Vonberg, 93, British physicist. (death announced on this date)
  - Dave Walker, 73, footballer (Burnley, Southampton).
- 22 April
  - Dick Balharry, 77, conservationist.
  - Desmond Boal, 85, lawyer and politician.
  - Bernard Penfold, 98, British Army general, general manager of the Royal Hong Kong Jockey Club (1972–1979).
- 23 April – Sir Philip Carter, 87, football director (Everton).
- 24 April
  - Ken Birch, 81, footballer (Bangor City).
  - Valentine Lamb, 76, journalist (The Irish Field).
- 25 April
  - Arthur Brittenden, 90, newspaper editor.
  - Richard West, 84, journalist and author.
  - Colin Bloomfield, 33, radio presenter (BBC Radio Derby).
- 27 April
  - Jay Appleton, 95, geographer.
  - David Fletcher, 90, cricketer (Surrey).
  - Chris Turner, 64, football player and manager (Peterborough).
  - John Wimpenny, 92, aeronautical engineer.
- 28 April
  - Keith Harris, 67, ventriloquist.
  - James Watson, 78, novelist.
- 29 April
  - Gary Liddell, 60, footballer (Grimsby Town, Heart of Midlothian).
  - Barbara Reynolds, 100, scholar, lexicographer and translator.
  - Brian Sedgemore, 78, politician.
- 30 April
  - Ronald Senator, 89, composer.
  - Nigel Terry, 69, actor.

=== May ===
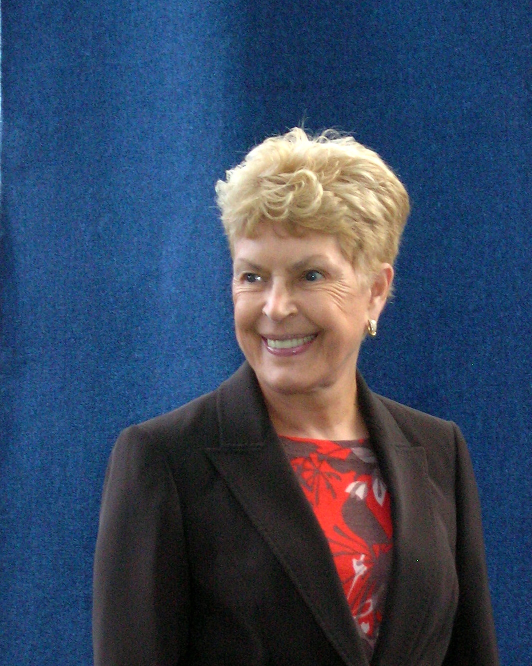
Ruth Rendell (1930–2015) in 2007

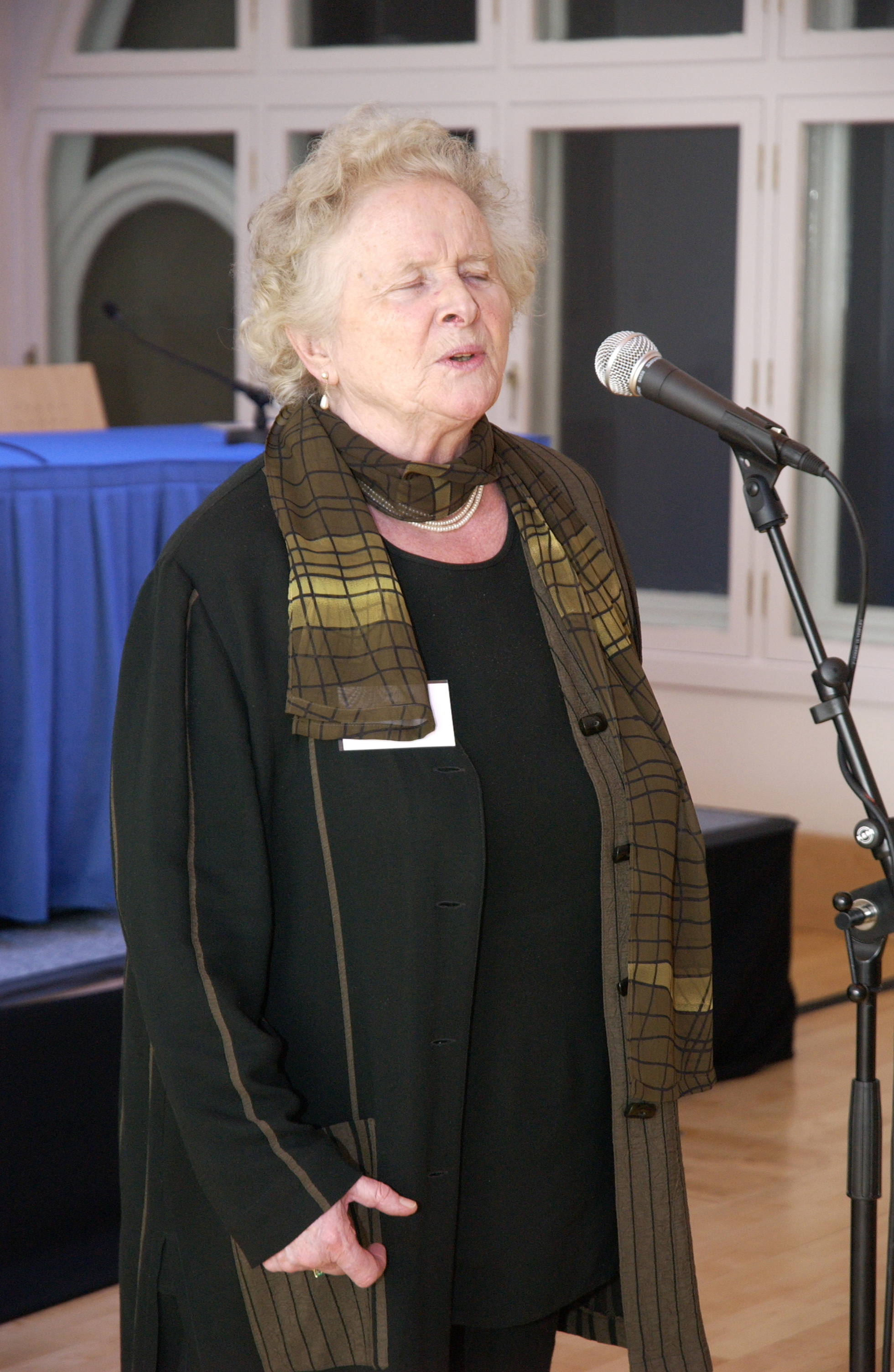
Flora MacNeil (1928–2015) in 2006

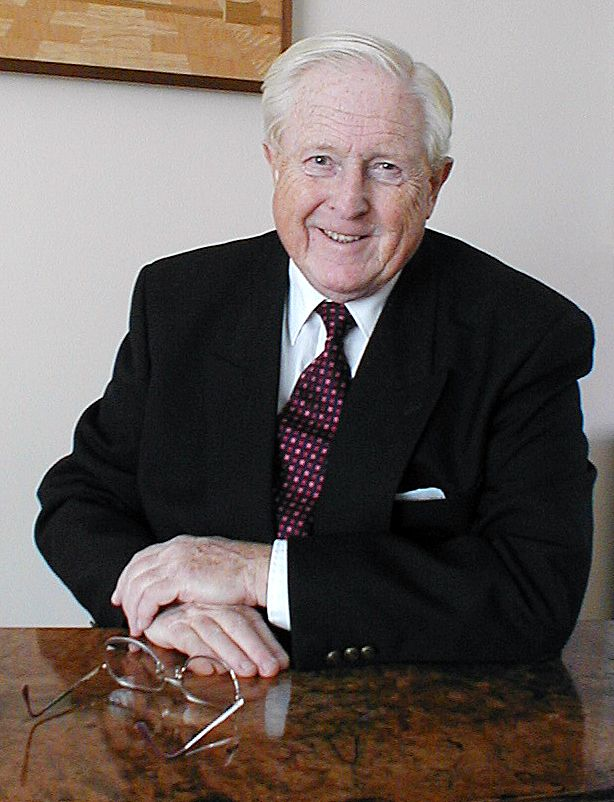
Raymond Gosling (1926–2015), who helped deduce the structure of DNA, in 2003

- 1 May
  - Jamie Bishop, 44, cricketer (Glamorgan).
  - Geoff Duke, 92, motorcycle racer, six-time Grand Prix world champion.
  - Alexander Kok, 89, cellist.
  - Paul Walter Myers, 82, classical record producer.
  - June Williams, 88, zoo owner (Chester Zoo).
  - John Tout, keyboardist (Renaissance).
  - Bob Wareing, 84, politician, MP for Liverpool West Derby (1983–2010).
  - Colin Whitaker, 82, footballer (Shrewsbury Town, Oldham Athletic).
- 2 May
  - Stuart Archer, 100, recipient of the George Cross.
  - Ryan McHenry, 27, film director and social media personality.
  - Nick Mead, 93, WWII Royal Navy officer.
  - Ruth Rendell, 85, crime novelist (Inspector Wexford series).
- 3 May
  - John Elders, 84, rugby union player (Leicester).
  - Alan Hall, 62, cell biologist.
  - Danny Jones, 29, rugby league footballer (Wales, Halifax, Keighley Cougars).
  - Elizabeth Raybould, nurse and nursing educator.
- 4 May
  - Ann Barr, 85, author (The Official Sloane Ranger Handbook).
- 5 May
  - Gerard Davison, 47, Provisional IRA commander.
  - Jimmy Jones, 87, footballer.
  - Ralph Lainson, 88, parasitologist.
  - Des O'Hagan, 81, politician (Workers' Party).
  - Brian Sedgemore, 78, politician, MP (1974–1979, 1983–2005).
- 6 May
  - Errol Brown, 71, singer (Hot Chocolate).
  - Michael O'Brien, 67, historian of the American South.
- 7 May
  - Michael Barratt Brown, 97, economist and political activist.
  - Sir Sam Edwards, 87, physicist.
  - Maurice Flanagan, 86, businessman (Emirates).
  - Rigby Graham, 84, artist.
- 8 May – Sir Edward Burgess, 87, British Army general.
- 9 May – Christopher Wood, 79, screenwriter (Moonraker, Remo Williams: The Adventure Begins, The Spy Who Loved Me).
- 11 May
  - John Hewie, 87, footballer (Charlton Athletic).
  - Isobel Varley, 77, world's most-tattooed senior woman.
  - Derek Walker, 85, architect.
- 12 May
  - Mervyn Burtch, 86, composer.
  - John Dewes, 88, cricketer (Middlesex, England).
  - Sir Peter Fry, 83, politician, MP (1969–1997).
  - Robin Page, 82, artist.
- 13 May
  - Eric Bakie, 87, footballer (Dunfermline Athletic, Aberdeen).
  - Bert Hitchen, 76, railway preservationist.
- 15 May – John Jarvis-Smith, 93, Royal Naval officer and shipbroker.
- 16 May – Flora MacNeil, 86, singer.
- 17 May
  - Rex Garner, 94, actor and theatre director.
  - Don Smoothey, 96, actor and comedian.
- 18 May
  - Tommy Bing, 83, footballer (Margate F.C.).
  - Raymond Gosling, 88, scientist.
- 19 May
  - Jack Aspinwall, 82, politician, MP (1979–1997).
  - Joe Carr, 83, footballer (St Johnstone).
  - State of Bengal, 50, music producer and DJ.
- 20 May
  - Edward Adeane, 75, courtier, Private Secretary to the Prince of Wales (1979–1985).
  - Sir Brian Cubbon, 87, civil servant, Permanent Secretary of the Home Office (1979–1988).
  - Eileen Gray, 95, bicycle racer and Mayor of Kingston upon Thames (1990–1991).
  - Sir John Lea, 91, Royal Navy vice-admiral.
- 21 May
  - David Blake, 90, cricketer (Hampshire).
  - Ernie Hannigan, 72, footballer (Preston North End, Coventry City).
  - Twinkle, 66, singer-songwriter.
  - Alan Woodward, 68, footballer (Sheffield United).
- 22 May
  - Sir John Horlock, 87, mechanical engineer and university vice-chancellor (Open University, University of Salford).
  - Terry Sue-Patt, 50, actor (Grange Hill). (death announced on this date)
  - Michael Osborne Waddell, 92, WWII army officer.
- 23 May
  - Moyra Caldecott, 87, writer.
  - Carole Seymour-Jones, 72, biographer.
- 24 May
  - Morris Beckman, 94, writer and anti-fascist activist (43 Group).
  - Tanith Lee, 67, science-fiction, horror and fantasy writer.
  - Dean Carroll, 52, rugby league footballer (Bradford Northern, Carlisle, Warrington, Batley, Doncaster)
- 25 May
  - Dewi Bridges, 81, Anglican prelate, Bishop of Swansea and Brecon (1988–1998).
  - Moc Morgan, 86, fly fisherman and naturalist.
- 26 May
  - William Davidson, 95, cricketer (Sussex).
  - Cyril Roger, 93, speedway rider.
- 27 May
  - Sir Gordon Hobday, 99, scientist and industrialist.
  - Andy King, 58, footballer (Everton).
- 28 May – Johnny Keating, 87, musician.
- 30 May
  - Jake D'Arcy, actor (Still Game).
  - John Drinkall, 93, diplomat, British Ambassador to Afghanistan (1972–1976) and High Commissioner to Jamaica (1976–1981).
  - Hugh Griffiths, Baron Griffiths, 91, jurist and law lord.
  - Julie Harris, 94, costume designer (Live and Let Die, A Hard Day's Night).
  - Tony McNamara, 85, footballer (Everton, Liverpool).
- 31 May
  - Roy Ralph, 94, cricketer (Essex). (death announced on this date)
  - Christina Reid, 73, playwright.

=== June ===
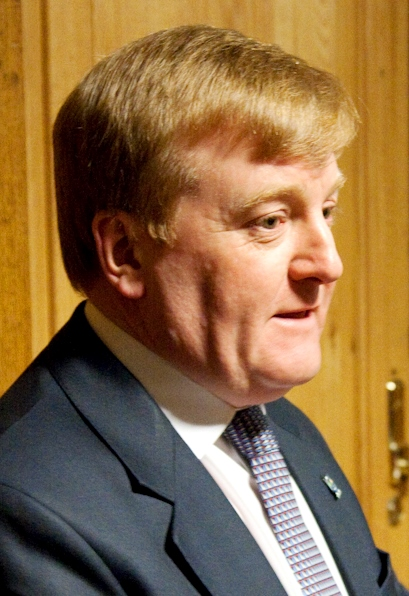
Charles Kennedy (1959–2015) in 2009

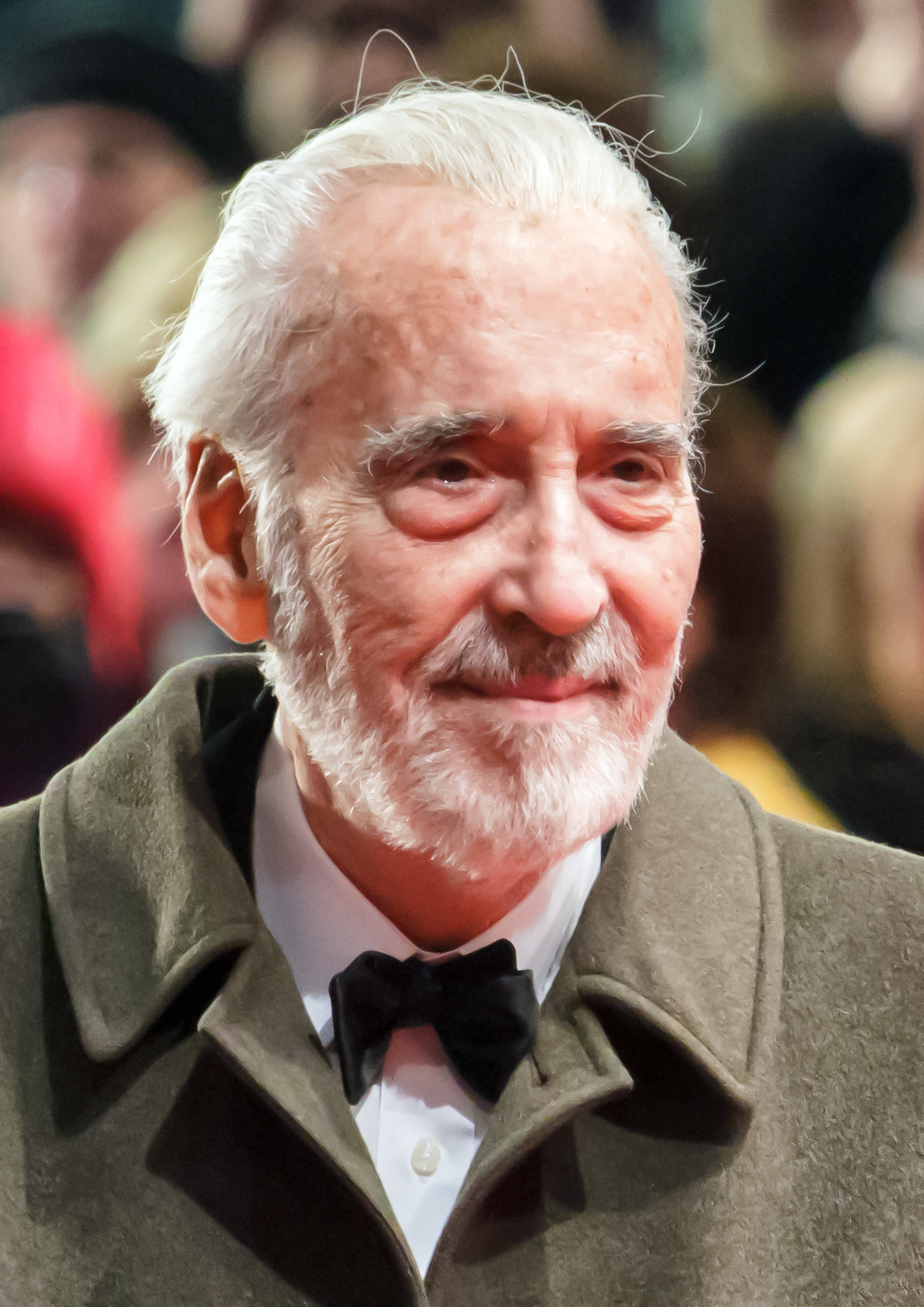
Sir Christopher Lee (1922–2015) at the Berlin International Film Festival of 2013

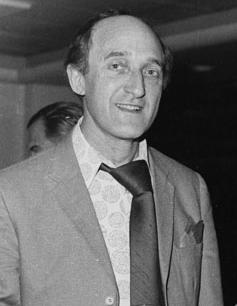
Ron Moody (1924–2015) in 1975

- 1 June
  - Charles Jacob, 94, stockbroker.
  - Charles Kennedy, 55, politician, MP (1983–2015) and leader of the Liberal Democrats (1999–2006).
- 2 June
  - Martin Cole, 83, sexologist.
  - Dennis Fidler, 76, footballer (Halifax Town, Macclesfield Town).
  - Clemens Nathan, 81, humanitarian.
  - Kenneth Tempest, 93, WWII Royal Air Force navigator.
- 4 June
  - Allan Fryer, 60, musician (Heaven).
  - Marguerite Patten, 99, cookery writer and home economist.
  - Roy Stroud, 90, footballer (West Ham).
  - Dame Anne Warburton, 87, diplomat, British Ambassador to Denmark (1976–1983), Permanent Representative to the UN in Geneva (1983–1985), President of Lucy Cavendish College (1985–1994).
  - Ray Weigh, 86, footballer.
- 5 June
  - Alan Bond, 77, businessman.
  - Ralph Hyde, 76, curator.
  - Jill Hyem, 78, scriptwriter and actress.
  - Richard Johnson, 87, actor (The Amorous Adventures of Moll Flanders, Julius Caesar, The Boy in the Striped Pyjamas).
  - Nick Marsh, 53, singer (Flesh for Lulu).
- 6 June
  - Barry Albin-Dyer, 64, undertaker.
  - Colin Jackson, 68, footballer (Scotland, Rangers).
- 7 June
  - Ken Barrett, 77, footballer (Aston Villa).
  - John Hurry, 95, WWII air force officer.
  - Sir Christopher Lee, 93, actor and singer (Dracula, The Lord of the Rings, Star Wars).
  - Gwilym Prichard, 84, painter.
- 8 June – Laurie Thompson, 77, translator.
- 10 June
  - David Bellotti, 71, politician and football executive, MP for Eastbourne (1990–1992), CEO of Brighton & Hove Albion.
  - Charles Wyndham Goodwyn, 81, philatelist, Keeper of the Royal Philatelic Collection (1995–2003)
- 11 June
  - Ian McKechnie, 73, footballer (Hull City).
  - Ron Moody, 91, actor (Oliver!, The Animals of Farthing Wood, EastEnders).
  - James Robertson, 86, footballer (Brentford).
  - Charles Williams, 90, Royal Navy rear admiral.
- 12 June
  - James Gowan, 91, architect.
  - Ernest Tomlinson, 90, composer.
- 13 June – Graham Lord, 72, biographer and novelist.
- 14 June – Phil Judd, 81, rugby union player (Coventry).
- 15 June – Rosalind Rowe, 82, table tennis player.
- 16 June
  - Howard Johnson, 89, footballer (Sheffield United). (death announced on this date)
  - Bill Sirs, 95, trade unionist.
  - Catharni Stern, 89, sculptor.
- 18 June – Brian Taylor, 78, footballer (Walsall, Shrewsbury Town).
- 19 June – Jim Brailsford, 85, cricket player (Derbyshire).
- 20 June
  - Ian Bradley, 77, New Zealand navy officer and politician.
  - Michael Kidson, 85, schoolmaster (Eton College).
- 21 June
  - Jim Rowan, 79, footballer (Airdrieonians, Celtic, Partick Thistle).
  - Carl Thompson, 33, heaviest man in the United Kingdom.
  - Jules Wright, 67, theatre director (Royal Court Theatre).
- 22 June
  - James Carnegie, 3rd Duke of Fife, 85, nobleman.
  - Malcolm Colledge, 75, archaeologist.
- 23 June
  - Jack Asher, 88, shinty player and referee.
  - Elizabeth MacLennan, 77, actress, writer and stage practitioner (7:84).
  - Ajit Singh, 74, economist.
  - Sir Chris Woodhead, 68, educationalist, Her Majesty's Chief Inspector of Schools in England (1994–2000).
- 24 June
  - John Palmer, 64, career criminal.
  - John Winn, 94, army officer.
- 25 June
  - Sir Graham Dorey, 82, judge, Bailiff of Guernsey (1992–1999).
  - Gordon Fearnley, 65, footballer (Bristol Rovers).
  - Patrick Macnee, 93, actor (The Avengers, This Is Spinal Tap, A View to a Kill).
- 26 June
  - Larry Carberry, 79, footballer (Ipswich Town).
  - David McAlister, 64, actor (Hollyoaks).
  - Norman Poole, 95, WWII paratrooper.
  - Denis Thwaites, 70, footballer (Birmingham City), victim of the 2015 Sousse attacks.
  - Michelle Watt, 38, television presenter (60 Minute Makeover).
- 27 June - Chris Squire, 67, bass guitarist (Yes).
- 28 June
  - Ian Allan, 92, publisher (Ian Allan Publishing).
  - Edgar Dawson, 83, rugby league footballer.
  - Joe Lobenstein, 88, politician and Mayor of Hackney (1997–2001)
- 29 June
  - Bill Cross, 97, WWII soldier.
  - Joseph Bryan Nelson, 83, ornithologist.
  - Kauto Star, 15, British trained racehorse, dual winner of the Cheltenham Gold Cup.
  - Bruce Rowland, 74, rock drummer (Fairport Convention).
- 30 June
  - Edward Burnham, 98, actor (To Sir, with Love, 10 Rillington Place, Doctor Who).
  - Robert Dewar, 70, computer scientist (AdaCore).
  - Alex Scott, 85–86, actor. (death reported on this date)

=== July ===
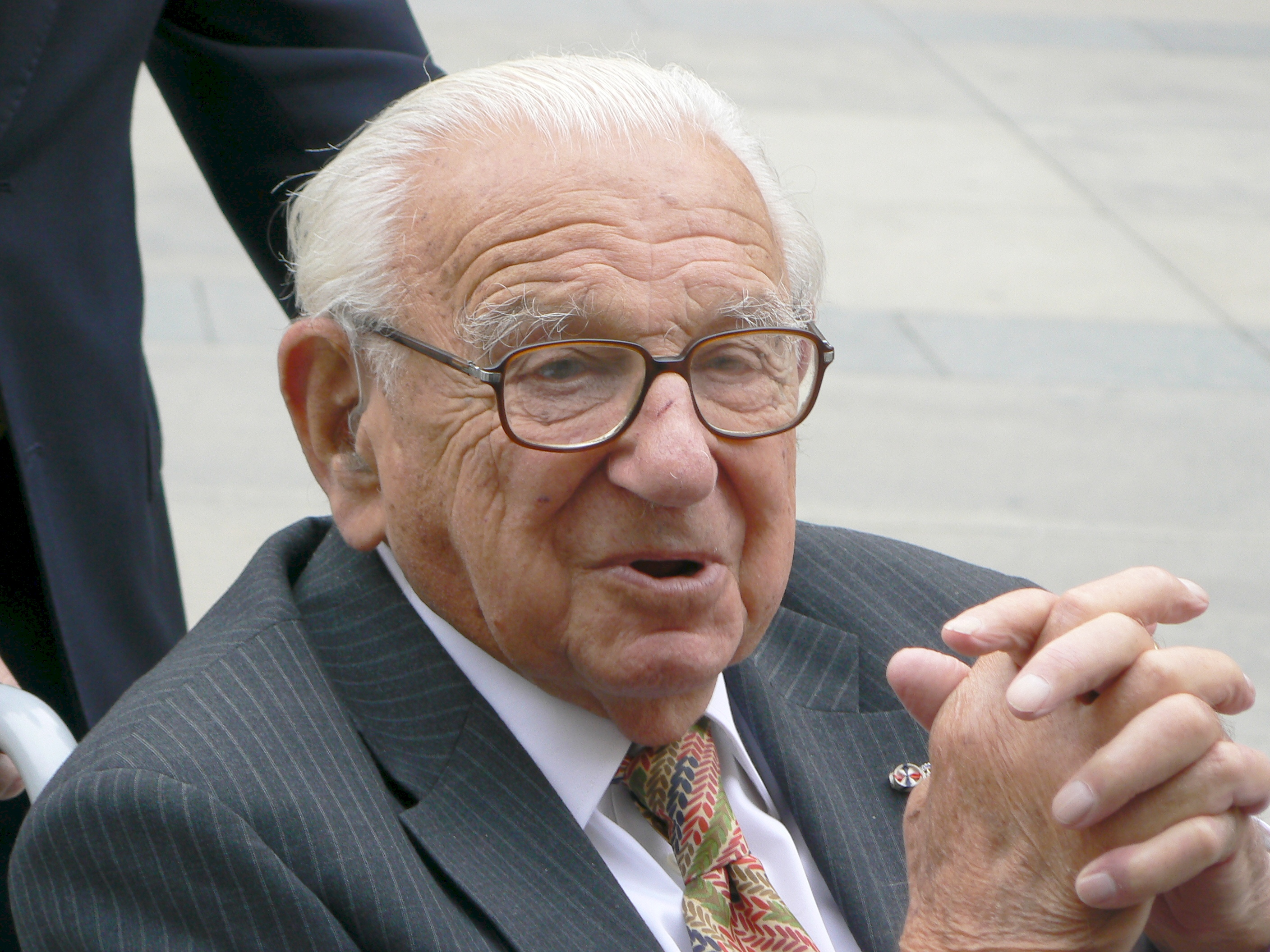
Sir Nicholas Winton (1909–2015) in Prague in 2007

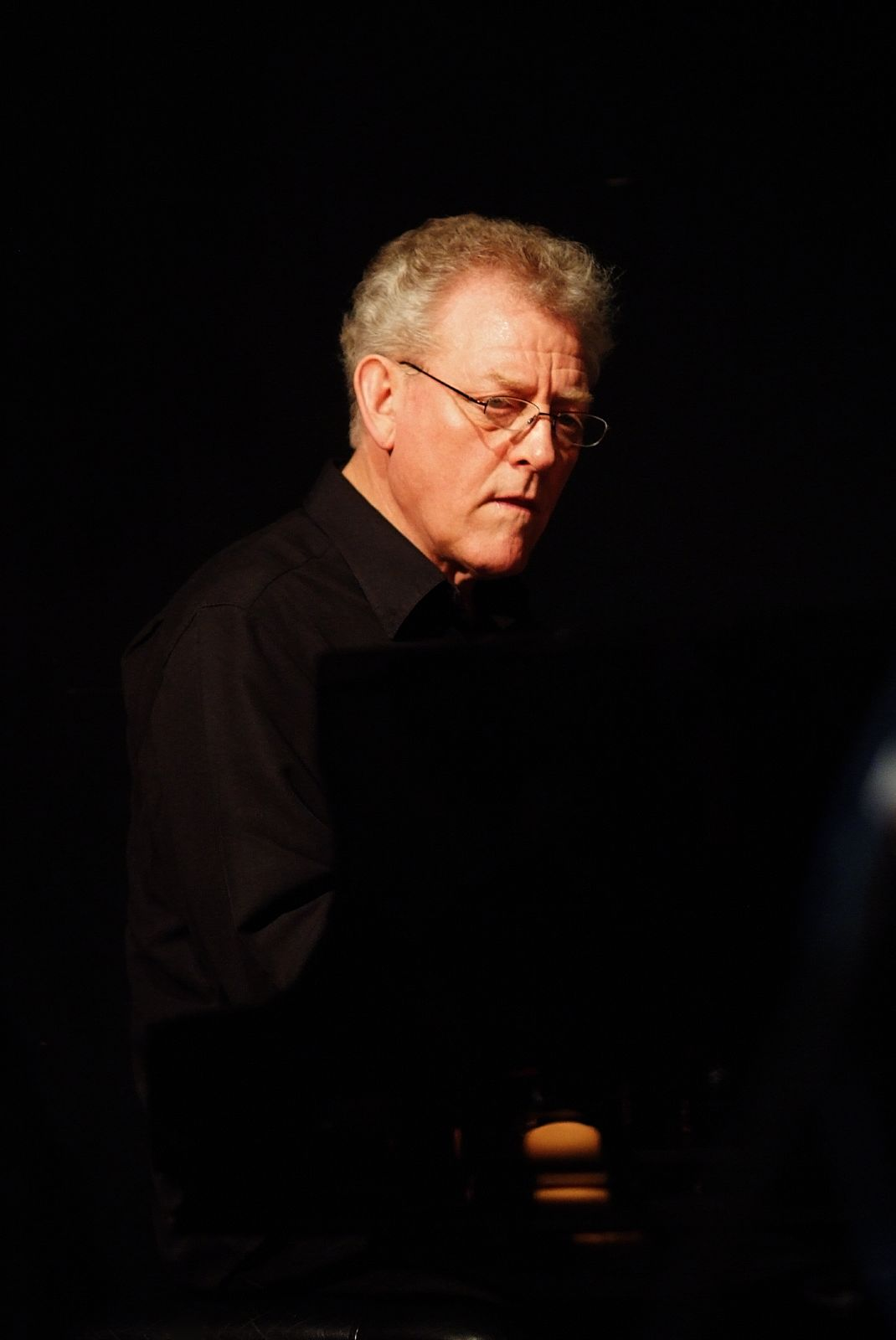
John Taylor (1942–2015) in 2008

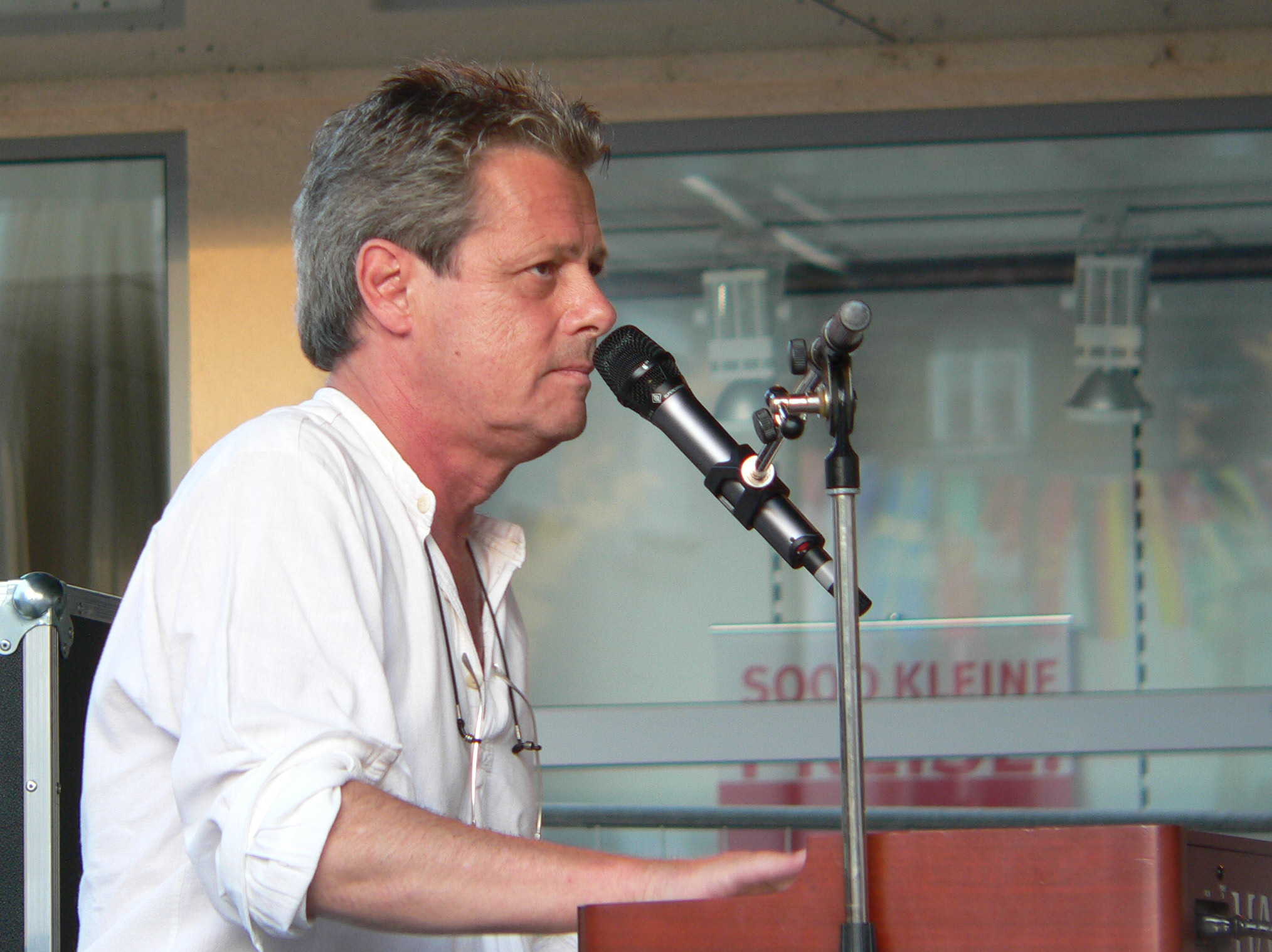
Eddie Hardin (1949–2015)

- 1 July
  - Edward Greenfield, 86, music critic and broadcaster.
  - Mike Lesser, 71, mathematical philosopher and political activist.
  - Charles Notcutt, 81, horticulturalist.
  - Sir Nicholas Winton, 106, humanitarian.
  - Russell Wood, 85, cricket player (Gloucestershire).
- 2 July – Jim Bradley, 94, athletics coach.
- 4 July
  - John Hinds, 35, motorcycle race doctor, anaesthetist and lecturer.
  - Anthony F. Upton, 85, historian.
  - Alan Walton, 79, biochemist and venture capitalist.
- 5 July
  - Andrew Alexander, 80, journalist (Daily Mail).
  - Sir Philip Goodhart, 89, politician, MP for Beckenham (1957–1992).
  - Joseph McKenzie, 86, photographer.
- 6 July
  - Terence Kelshaw, 78, Episcopal Bishop of Rio Grande (1989–2004).
  - Sir John Lambert, 94, diplomat, Ambassador to Tunisia (1977–1981).
  - Fraser Scott, 95, army officer.
- 8 July – Lloyd Reckord, 86, actor and director.
- 9 July
  - Caspar Bowden, 53, privacy advocate.
  - Bill Foord, 91, cricket player (Yorkshire).
  - Bill Hunter, 95, political activist and author.
- 10 July
  - Rosemary Dinnage, 87, author and reviewer.
  - Peter Jones, 85, journalist and author.
  - Jimmy Murray, 82, footballer (Heart of Midlothian, Scotland).
  - Roger Rees, 71, actor (Cheers, The Life and Adventures of Nicholas Nickleby, The West Wing).
  - Grahame Vivian, 95, army officer.
- 11 July
  - Joyce M. Bennett, 92, Anglican priest.
  - Mark Birdwood, 3rd Baron Birdwood, 76, peer and politician.
  - J.P.C. Roach, 95, historian.
- 13 July
  - Michael Rayner, 82, opera singer.
  - Martin Litchfield West, 77, classical scholar.
  - Eric Wrixon, 68, keyboardist (Them, Thin Lizzy).
- 14 July – Olaf Pooley, 101, actor and writer (Doctor Who, Star Trek: Voyager, Sunday Night Theatre).
- 15 July
  - Aubrey Morris, 89, actor (A Clockwork Orange, Love and Death, The Wicker Man).
- 16 July
  - Denis Avey, 96, World War II veteran and memoirist.
  - Sir Jack Goody, 95, social anthropologist.
  - Brian Hall, 68, footballer (Liverpool).
- 17 July
  - Owen Chadwick, 99, rugby player, historian, and theologian.
  - Ray Jessel, 85, scriptwriter and songwriter (Baker Street).
  - John McCluskey, 71, boxer.
  - Nova Pilbeam, 95, actress (The Man Who Knew Too Much, Young and Innocent, Tudor Rose).
  - John Taylor, 72, jazz pianist.
- 18 July
  - Dave Black, 62, musician (Goldie).
  - Allan Willett, 78/9, soldier, businessman and Lord-Lieutenant of Kent (2002–2011).
- 19 July – Samantha Cawkwell, 31, dressage equestrian rider.
- 20 July
  - Tom Beard, 50, actor (Salmon Fishing in the Yemen, Hereafter, Wallander).
  - Fred Else, 82, footballer (Preston North End).
- 21 July – Mike Turner, 80, cricketer (Leicestershire).
- 22 July
  - Barbara Calvert, 89, barrister.
  - Eddie Hardin, 66, rock musician and singer-songwriter (Spencer Davis Group).
  - Natasha Parry, 84, actress (Romeo and Juliet, Oh! What a Lovely War, Meetings with Remarkable Men).
- 24 July – Gordon Stuart, 91, artist.
- 25 July
  - Robin Phillips, 73, actor (Tales from the Crypt, Doctor Who).
- 26 July
  - Peggy Evans, 94, actress (The Blue Lamp).
  - Lee Harwood, 76, poet.
- 27 July
  - Edward Campbell, 71, rugby league footballer of the 1960s, and 1970s.
  - Paul Langford, 69, historian, Rector of Lincoln College, Oxford (2000–2012).
  - Chris Lazari, 69, property developer.
  - Anthony Shaw, 85, army general, Director General Army Medical Services (1988–1990).
- 28 July
  - John M. Hull, 80, theologian.
  - David Leaning, 78, Anglican priest.
- 29 July
  - Antony Holland, 95, actor, playwright, and theatre director.
  - Sir Peter O'Sullevan, 97, horse racing commentator.
- 31 July
  - Coralie de Burgh, 90, painter.
  - Derek Turner, 82, English rugby league player (Wakefield Trinity).

=== August ===
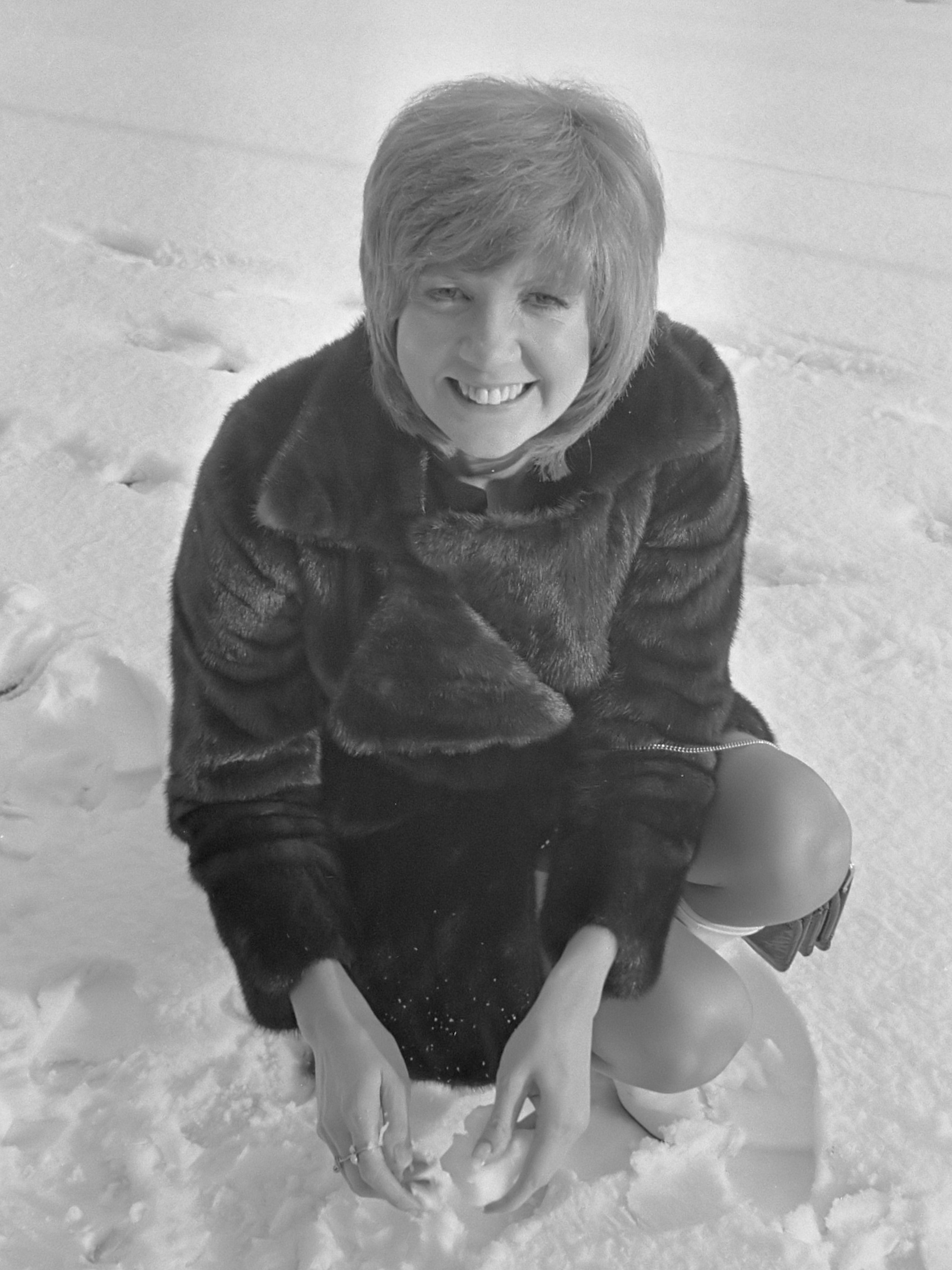
Cilla Black (1943–2015) in 1970

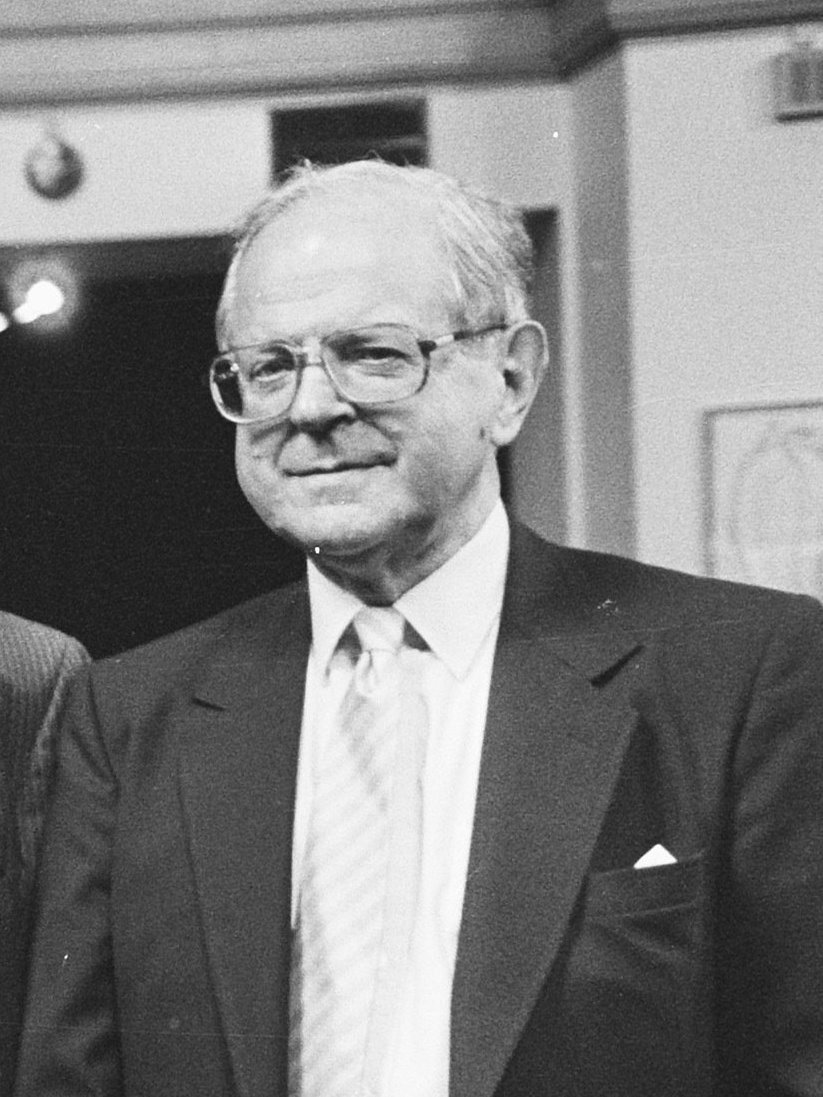
Robert Conquest (1917–2015) in 1987

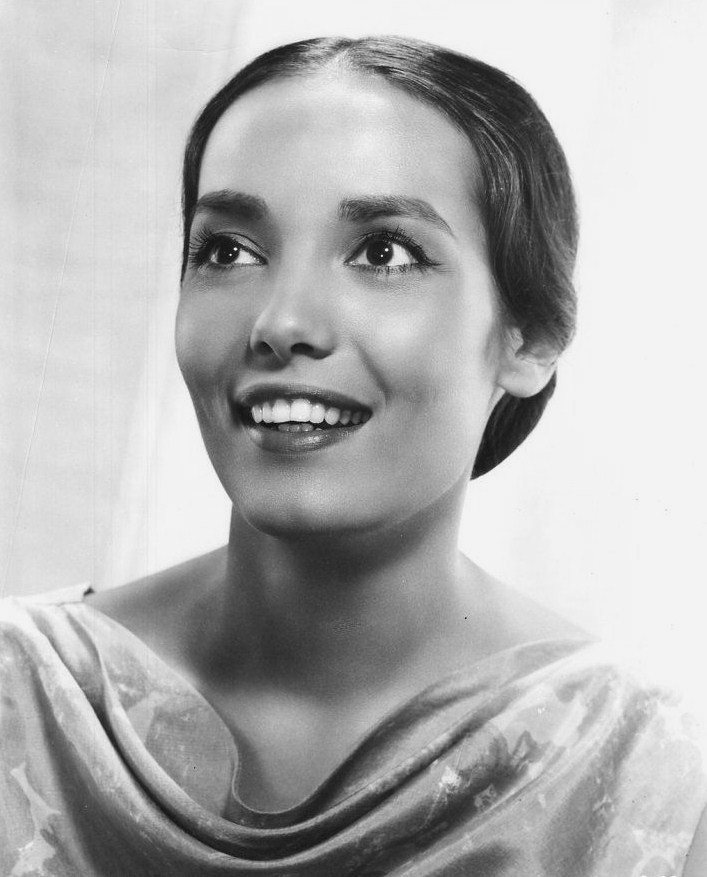
Anna Kashfi (1934–2015) in 1959

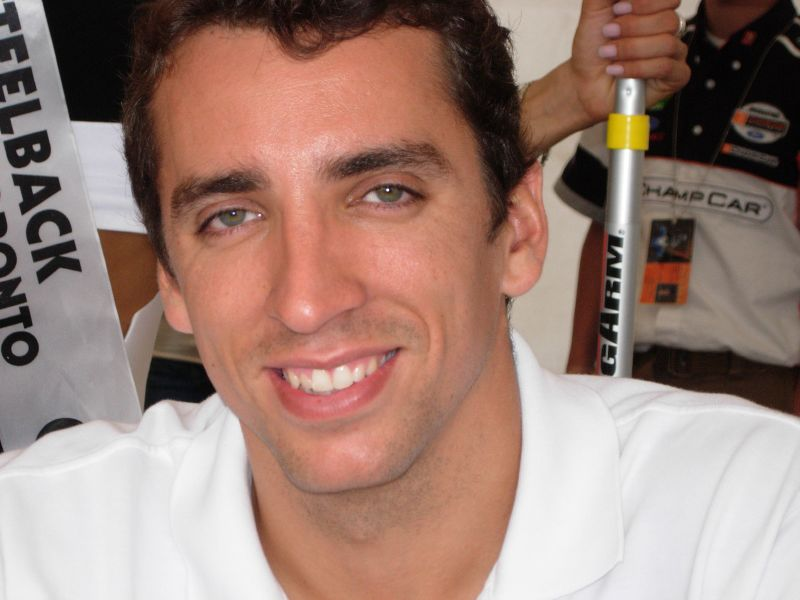
Justin Wilson (1978–2015) in 2007

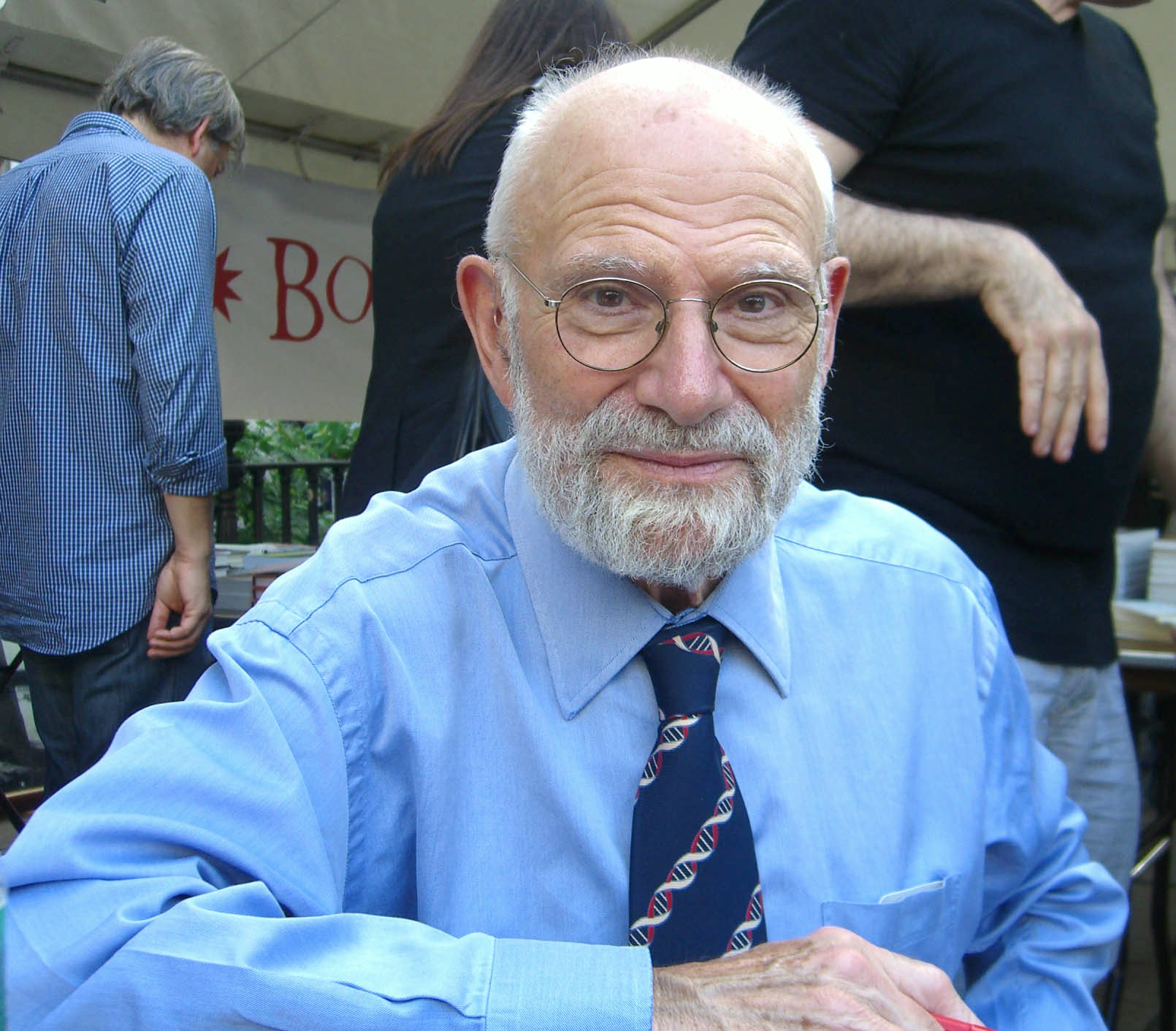
Oliver Sacks (1933–2015) in 2009

- 1 August – Cilla Black, 72, singer ("It's for You", "You're My World", "Step Inside Love"), television presenter (Blind Date, Surprise Surprise, The Moment of Truth) and actress.
- 2 August
  - Sammy Cox, 91, footballer (Scotland, Rangers).
  - Ken Jones, 85, author and Buddhist activist.
  - Ken Lewis, 74, singer and songwriter (Can't You Hear My Heartbeat).
- 3 August
  - Carol Brown Janeway, 71, translator.
  - Robert Conquest, 98, historian (The Great Terror).
- 4 August
  - Ken Barnes, 82, writer and record producer.
  - Arthur Dorward, 90, rugby union player.
- 5 August
  - Simon Burrows, 86, Anglican prelate, Bishop of Buckingham (1974–1994).
  - George Cole, 90, actor (Minder, St. Trinian's, Mary Reilly).
  - Mark Herdman, 83, diplomat, Governor of the British Virgin Islands (1986–1991).
  - Arthur Walter James, 103, journalist, editor of the Times Educational Supplement (1952–1969).
  - Tony Millington, 72, footballer (Wales, Swansea City, Peterborough United).
- 6 August – Danny Hegan, 72, footballer (Northern Ireland, Ipswich Town, Wolves).
- 7 August – Neville Neville, 65, cricketer and football club director (Bury).
- 8 August
  - Sir Alec Atkinson, 96, WWII air force officer and civil servant.
  - Ronald Gordon, 88, Anglican prelate, Bishop of Portsmouth (1975–1984) and Bishop at Lambeth (1984–1992).
  - Christopher Marshall, 66, doctor and cancer researcher.
- 9 August
  - Jack Gold, 85, film director (The Naked Civil Servant, Aces High).
  - David Nobbs, 80, novelist and comedy writer (The Fall and Rise of Reginald Perrin, The Two Ronnies, Fairly Secret Army).
  - Jonathan Ollivier, 38, ballet dancer.
  - Susan Sheridan, 68, voice actress (The Black Cauldron, The Hitchhiker's Guide to the Galaxy, Noddy's Toyland Adventures).
- 11 August – Philip Arthur Whitcombe, 92, cricketer and army officer.
- 12 August
  - Stephen Lewis, 88, comedy actor (On the Buses, Last of the Summer Wine, Don't Drink the Water).
  - Chris Marustik, 54, footballer (Wales, Swansea City, Cardiff City, Newport County).
  - John Scott, 59, organist and choirmaster.
- 14 August – Jazz Summers, 71, music manager (Scissor Sisters, The Verve, Snow Patrol).
- 15 August – Malcolm Craddock, 77, television producer (Sharpe)
- 16 August
  - Anna Kashfi, 80, actress.
  - Kitty McGeever, 44, actress (Emmerdale).
  - George Merchant, 89, footballer (Dundee, Falkirk).
- 17 August
  - William B. Bonnor, 94, physicist and mathematician.
  - Marlene Jefferson, 81, politician.
- 18 August
  - Beata Brookes, 84, politician, MEP for North Wales (1979–1989).
  - Hugh Courtenay, 18th Earl of Devon, 73, nobleman.
  - Russell Henderson, 91, jazz musician.
  - Charles Read, 57, mathematician.
  - Edgar Rumney, 78, footballer (Colchester United).
  - Roger Smalley, 72, composer.
- 21 August
  - Sir Bob Hepple, 81, legal scholar, Master of Clare College, Cambridge (1993–2003).
  - Denise Marshall, 53, equal rights campaigner
  - Gerry Steinberg, 70, politician, MP for City of Durham (1987–2005).
- 22 August
  - Tommy Lowry, 69, footballer (Crewe Alexandra).
  - Andy Mapple, 52, waterskier.
  - Eric Thompson, 95, racing driver.
  - Charles Tomlinson, 88, poet and poetry translator.
- 23 August – Joanna Strathdee, 60, politician.
- 24 August
  - Justin Wilson, 37, racing driver.
  - Annette Worsley-Taylor, 71, fashion promoter.
- 25 August
  - Colin Fry, 53, TV personality.
  - Geraint Stanley Jones, 79, television executive (BBC Wales, S4C).
- 26 August
  - Junaid Hussain, 21, hacker and Islamist propagandist.
  - P. J. Kavanagh, 84, poet.
- 27 August – Teresa Gorman, 83, politician, MP for Billericay (1987–2001).
- 28 August
  - John Buckingham, 72, chemist.
  - Lindsay Charnock, 60, jockey.
- 29 August
  - Robin Bilbie, 73, cricketer (Nottinghamshire).
  - Graham Leggat, 81, footballer (Aberdeen, Fulham, Scotland).
  - Ron Searle, 96, politician, Mayor of Mississauga (1976–1978).
  - Sir Kenneth Stowe, 88, civil servant.
- 30 August
  - George Fisher, 90, footballer (Millwall, Colchester United).
  - Brian Hord, 81, chartered surveyor and politician, MEP for London West (1979–1984).
  - Oliver Sacks, 82, neurologist and author (The Man Who Mistook His Wife for a Hat, Awakenings).
  - David Williamson, Baron Williamson of Horton, 81, civil servant and peer, Convenor of the Cross-Bench Peers (2004–2007).
- 31 August
  - Joy Beverley, 91, singer (Beverley Sisters).
  - Edward Douglas-Scott-Montagu, 3rd Baron Montagu of Beaulieu, 88, nobleman.

=== September ===
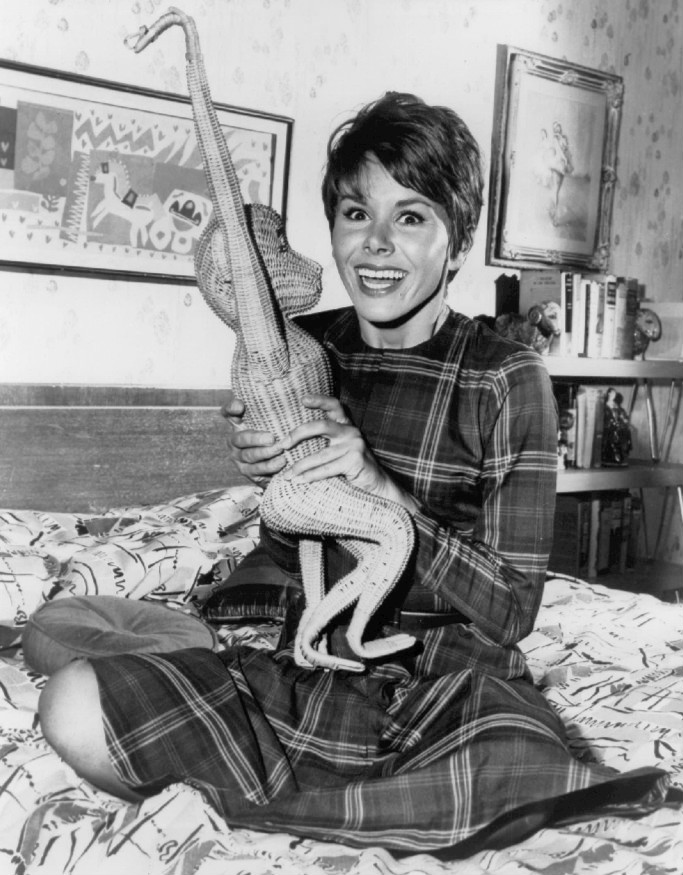
Judy Carne (1939–2015) in 1962

Sir David Willcocks (1919–2015) (centre) with Mellisma

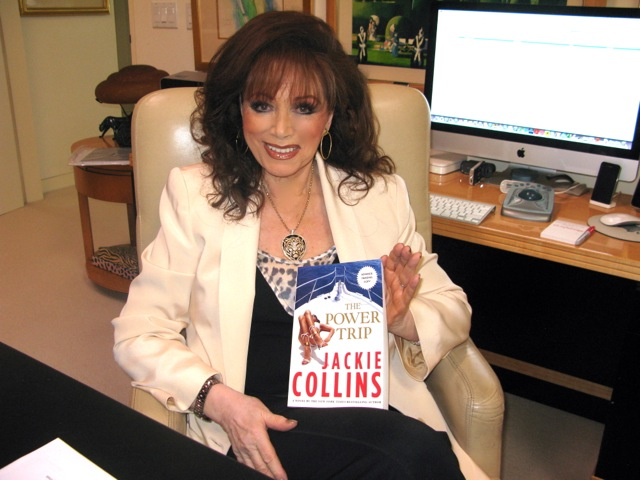
Jackie Collins (1937–2015), whose books have sold over 500 million copies, in 2011

- 2 September
  - Stan Kane, 86, actor (Storm).
  - Tessa Ransford, 77, poet and founder of the Scottish Poetry Library.
  - Roland Rees, 73, theatre director.
  - William Arbuckle Reid, 82, curriculum theorist.
- 3 September
  - Sir Adrian Cadbury, 86, businessman and rower.
  - Judy Carne, 76, actress and comedian (Rowan & Martin's Laugh-In).
  - Harold Drasdo, 85, rock climber and writer.
  - Dan Eley, 100, chemist (Eley-Rideal mechanism).
  - Ken Horne, 89, footballer (Brentford).
  - John Waller, 91, Anglican prelate, Bishop of Stafford (1979–1987).
- 4 September
  - Claus Moser, Baron Moser, 92, statistician.
  - Rico Rodriguez, 80, trombonist (The Specials).
  - Jonathan Woolf, 54, architect.
- 5 September
  - Colin Faver, 63, disc jockey and founder of Kiss FM.
  - Yotaro Kobayashi, 82, businessman (Fuji Xerox).
- 6 September
  - Ralph Milne, 54, footballer (Dundee United, Manchester United).
  - Peter Walker, 65, RAF officer and Lieutenant Governor of Guernsey (since 2011).
- 7 September – David Cregan, 83, playwright.
- 9 September – John Allen, 83, Anglican priest, Provost of Wakefield (1982–1997).
- 10 September – Beryl Renwick, 89, radio broadcaster.
- 12 September
  - John Emerton, 87, Hebraist, Regius Professor of Hebrew at Cambridge University (1968–1995).
  - Malcolm Graham, 81, footballer (Barnsley, Leyton Orient, Queens Park Rangers).
  - Kenneth Leech, 76, Anglican priest and theologian, founded Centrepoint.
  - Bryn Merrick, 56, bassist (The Damned).
  - Ron Springett, 80, footballer (Sheffield Wednesday).
- 13 September
  - Brian Close, 84, cricketer (Yorkshire, Somerset, England) and footballer (Leeds United, Arsenal, Bradford City).
  - Barrie Meyer, 83, footballer (Bristol Rovers, Bristol City, Plymouth Argyle) and cricketer (Gloucestershire).
  - Raymond Mould, 74, property developer and racehorse owner.
  - Ted Smith, 95, nature conservationist.
- 14 September
  - Martin Kearns, 38, drummer (Bolt Thrower).
  - Bob Ledger, 77, footballer (Huddersfield Town, Oldham Athletic, Mansfield Town).
- 15 September
  - Keith Remfry, 67, judoka, Olympic silver medallist (1976).
  - Tommy Thompson, 86, footballer (Aston Villa, Preston North End).
- 16 September
  - David Ashby, 65, motorcycle speedway rider.
  - David Cook, 74, British broadcaster and writer.
  - Robert Kilpatrick, Baron Kilpatrick of Kincraig, 89, physician and life peer.
  - Allan Wright, 95, WWII airman and Battle of Britain veteran.
- 17 September
  - Sir Peter Heatly, 91, diver, chairman of the Commonwealth Games Federation.
  - Joe Maiden, 74, horticulturist.
  - Sir David Willcocks, 95, choirmaster and director of music at Choir of King's College, Cambridge.
- 19 September
  - Jackie Collins, 77, novelist.
  - Brian Sewell, 84, art critic.
- 20 September
  - Geoffrey Lilley, 95, British aeronautical scientist.
  - John Parker, 6th Earl of Morley, 92, aristocrat, Lord Lieutenant of Devon (1982–1998).
- 21 September
  - Juliet Clutton-Brock, 82, zooarchaeologist.
  - Kenneth L. Johnson, engineer.
  - Ray Warleigh, 76, saxophonist and flautist.
- 22 September – Derek Ware, 77, stuntman and actor (Doctor Who, The Italian Job).
- 24 September – Michael Howard, 67, pagan author and editor (The Cauldron).
- 25 September
  - Jim Meadowcroft, 68, snooker player and commentator.
  - Joe Wilson, 78, footballer (Workington Reds, Wolverhampton Wanderers).
- 27 September
  - Roland Collins, 97, painter.
  - John Guillermin, 89, film director and producer.
  - Frank Tyson, 85, cricketer, journalist and commentator.
- 28 September
  - Sir Peter Abbott, 73, admiral, Vice-Chief of the Defence Staff (1997–2001).
  - Valerie Ganz, 79, painter.
  - Alexander Faris, 94, composer.
- 29 September – Gillian Gear, 72, English historian and archivist (Barnet Museum).

=== October ===
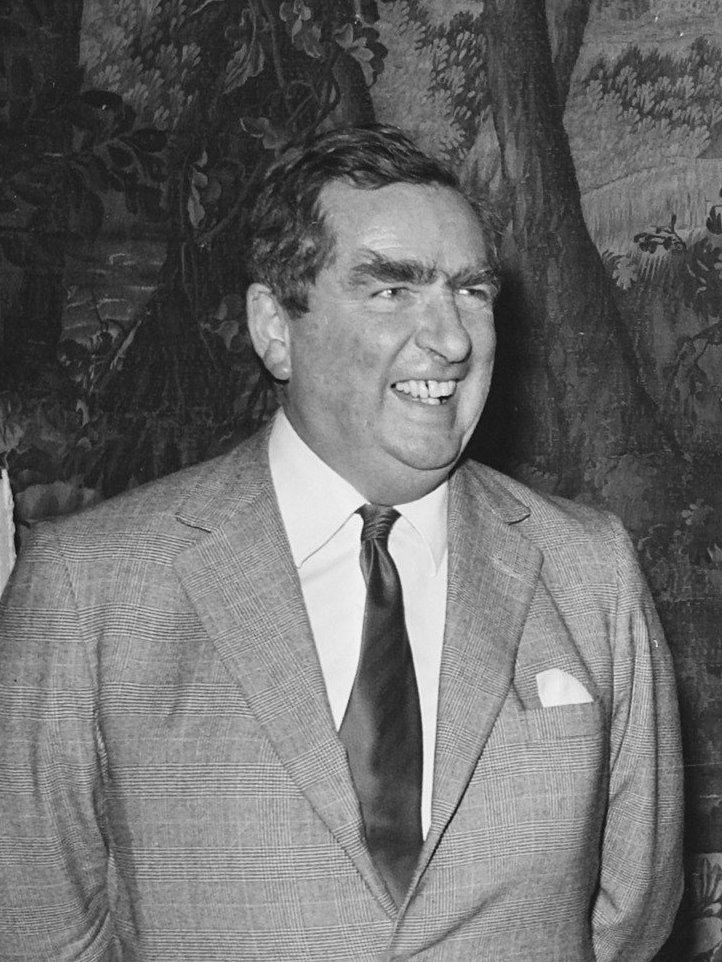
Denis Healey (1917–2015) in 1974

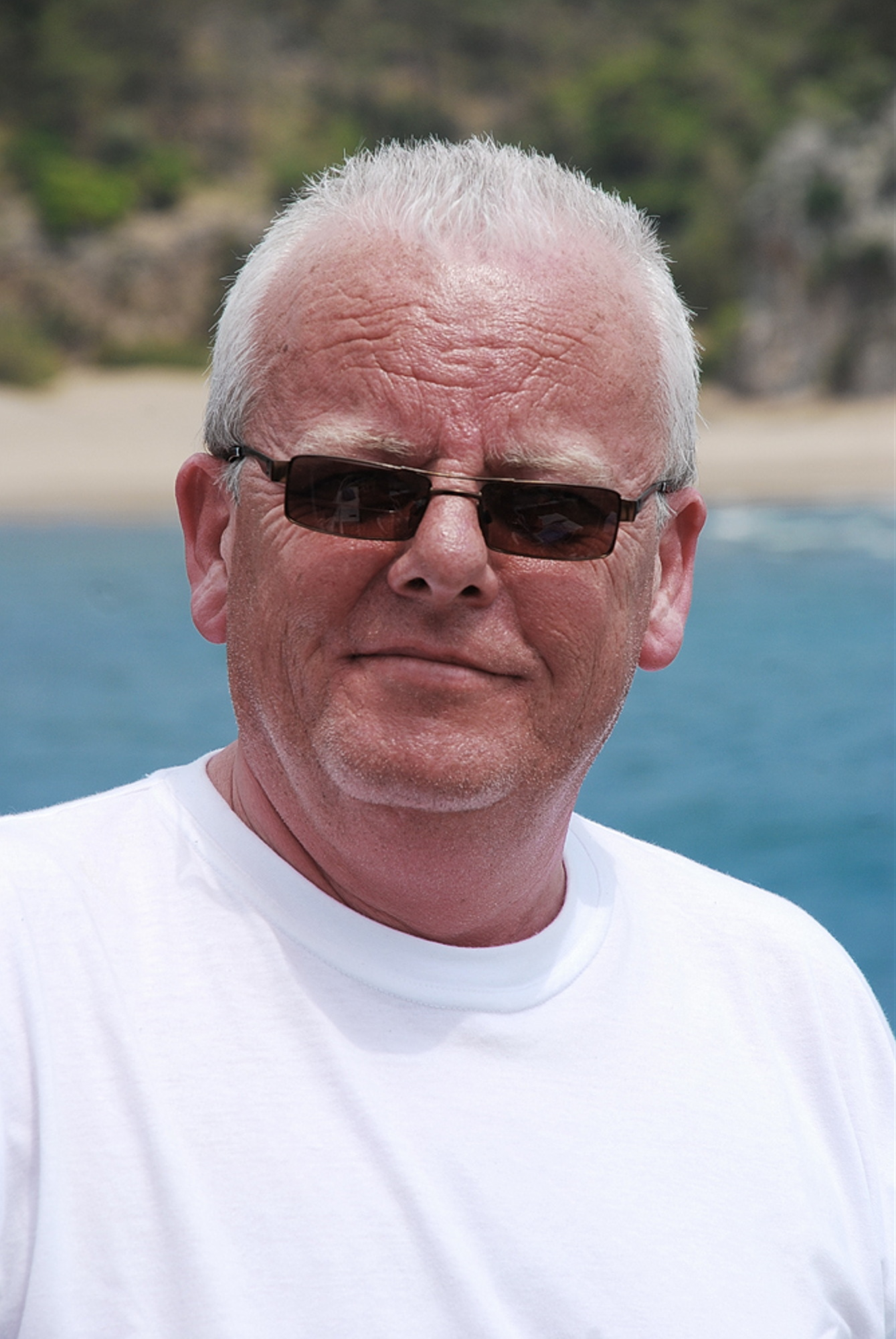
Jim Diamond (1951–2015) in 2009

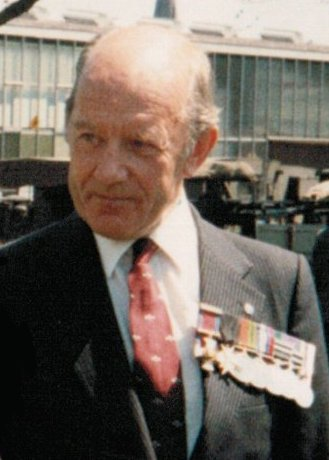
Major-General Michael Walsh (1927–2015) in 1984

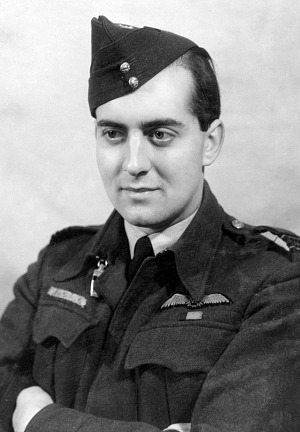
Sir Michael Beetham (1923–2015) in 1944, when he was a flight lieutenant

- 1 October
  - Illtyd Harrington, 84, politician.
  - Joe Wark, 67, footballer (Motherwell).
- 2 October
  - Brian Friel, 86, dramatist.
  - Alex Giannini, 52, actor (Elizabeth: The Golden Age, Legend).
  - Coleridge Goode, 100, jazz bassist.
  - Arthur Lawson Johnston, 3rd Baron Luke, 82, peer and politician.
  - Johnny Paton, 92, footballer (Brentford, Watford, Celtic), coach and manager (Arsenal 'A').
  - Fred Ridgway, 92, cricketer (Kent, MCC, England).
- 3 October
  - Denis Healey, Lord Healey, 98, politician, Labour MP (1952–1992), Secretary of State for Defence (1964–1970), and Chancellor of the Exchequer (1974–1979).
  - Christopher Tambling, 50–51, composer and choirmaster.
- 4 October
  - Jack McKee, 71, politician, Mayor of Larne (1984–1985).
  - Sir John Severne, 90, Royal Air Force officer.
- 5 October
  - Joe Henson, 82, farmer and conservationist.
  - Niall Rudd, 88, classical scholar.
- 6 October – Trevor Lloyd, 91, rugby union player (Aberavon Quins, Maesteg).
- 7 October
  - W. R. Mitchell, 87, writer and editor (Dalesman).
  - Clive Young, 67, Anglican prelate, Bishop of Dunwich (1999–2013).
- 8 October
  - Richard Davies, 89, actor.
  - Jim Diamond, 64, singer-songwriter ("I Should Have Known Better").
  - Dora Holzhandler, 87, painter.
  - Hugh Scully, 72, television presenter (Antiques Roadshow).
- 9 October
  - Gordon Honeycombe, 79, newscaster, author and actor.
  - Geoffrey Howe, Baron Howe of Aberavon, 88, politician, Conservative MP (1964–1992), Chancellor of the Exchequer (1979–1983) and Foreign Secretary (1983–1989).
  - Julia Jones, 92, scriptwriter (Quiet as a Nun, Our Mutual Friend).
- 10 October
  - Kane Ashcroft, 29, footballer (York City).
  - Sir David Penry-Davey, 73, jurist.
  - Maggie Riley, 79, actress (Hazell, Grange Hill).
- 11 October
  - David Hunt, 55, racing driver.
  - Carey Lander, 33, keyboard player and singer (Camera Obscura).
  - Andrew Sayers, 58, curator, Director of the National Portrait Gallery of Australia (1998–2010).
- 12 October
  - Paul King, 63, manager (The Police, Dire Straits).
  - Martin Lange, 71, football executive (Brentford).
- 13 October
  - Duncan Druce, 76, composer and musicologist.
  - Sue Lloyd-Roberts, 62, television journalist (BBC, ITN).
  - Michael J. H. Walsh, 88, Army general and Scouting leader, Chief Scout (1982–1988).
  - Michael John Wise, 97, geographer.
- 14 October
  - Bobby Braithwaite, 78, footballer (Linfield, Middlesbrough, Northern Ireland).
  - Sol Roper, 79, rugby league footballer (Workington Town).
- 15 October – Stella Sutherland, 91, poet.
- 16 October
  - David Drew, 77, ballet dancer.
  - Julia Wilson Dickson, 66, dialect coach (Braveheart, In Bruges, Chocolat).
- 17 October
  - Johnny Hamilton, 66, footballer (Hibernian, Rangers, St Johnstone)
  - Howard Kendall, 69, football player and manager (Blackburn Rovers, Everton).
  - Jacky Sutton, 50, journalist.
- 18 October – Paul West, 85, novelist and poet.
- 19 October
  - Ron Greener, 81, footballer (Darlington).
  - Patricia Kern, 88, mezzo-soprano and voice teacher.
  - Dick Sharples, 88, scriptwriter.
- 20 October
  - Michael Meacher, 75, politician, MP for Oldham West (1970–1997) and Oldham West and Royton (1997–2015).
  - Don Rendell, 89, jazz musician.
  - Ian Steel, 87, cyclist.
  - Jane Wardle, 64, clinical psychologist.
- 21 October
  - Peter Baldwin, 82, actor (Coronation Street).
  - Francis Kiddle, 73, philatelist.
  - Norman W. Moore, 92, conservationist.
  - William Murray, 8th Earl of Mansfield and Mansfield, 85, nobleman and politician.
  - Diana Pullein-Thompson, 90, writer.
- 22 October
  - Bryan Lowe, 89, cricketer (Cheshire).
  - Joe Moss, 72, music manager (The Smiths, Johnny Marr).
- 23 October
  - John Bossy, 82, historian.
  - Michel Couriard, 61, Jersey civil servant.
  - Antony Hignell, 87, sportsman.
  - Peter Price, 83, footballer (Ayr United, St Mirren).
- 24 October
  - John Adie, 69, festival promoter, co-founder of Two Moors Festival.
  - Sir Michael Beetham, 92, air marshal, Chief of the Air Staff (1977–1982).
  - Kirsty Howard, 20, fundraiser.
- 25 October
  - David Cesarani, 58, Jewish historian.
  - Ken Graveney, 90, cricketer (Gloucestershire).
  - Lisa Jardine, 70, early modern historian.
  - Matt Watson, 79, footballer (Kilmarnock).
- 26 October
  - S. Barry Cooper, 72, mathematician, computational theorist, author and activist.
  - Penelope Houston, 88, film critic, editor of Sight & Sound (1956–1990).
  - Sam Sarpong, 40, model and actor (Love Don't Cost a Thing, Farm House, Anchor Baby)
- 27 October
  - Philip French, 82, journalist and film critic (The Observer) and BBC radio producer.
  - Gulam Noon, Baron Noon, 79, food production businessman and chancellor of University of East London.
- 28 October
  - Diane Charlemagne, 51, singer (Urban Cookie Collective).
  - Lillian Ladele, 54, Christian rights activist, plaintiff in Ladele v London Borough of Islington case.
  - Nadia Menaz, 24, model.
  - Sir Gerry Neale, 74, politician, MP for North Cornwall (1979–1992).
- 29 October
  - Tony Van Frater, 51, musician (Red Alert).
  - Kenneth Gilbert, 84, actor (Doctor Who, House of Cards).

=== November ===
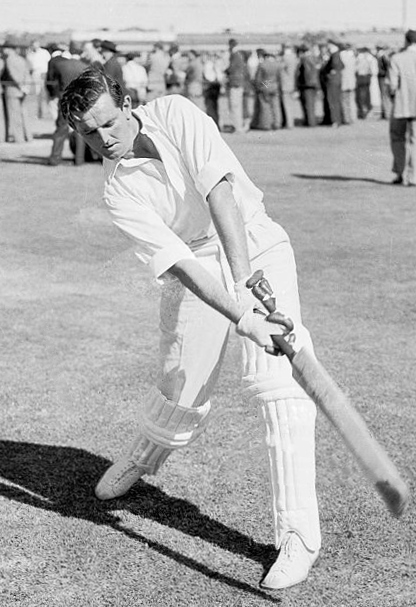
Tom Graveney (1927–2015) in 1954

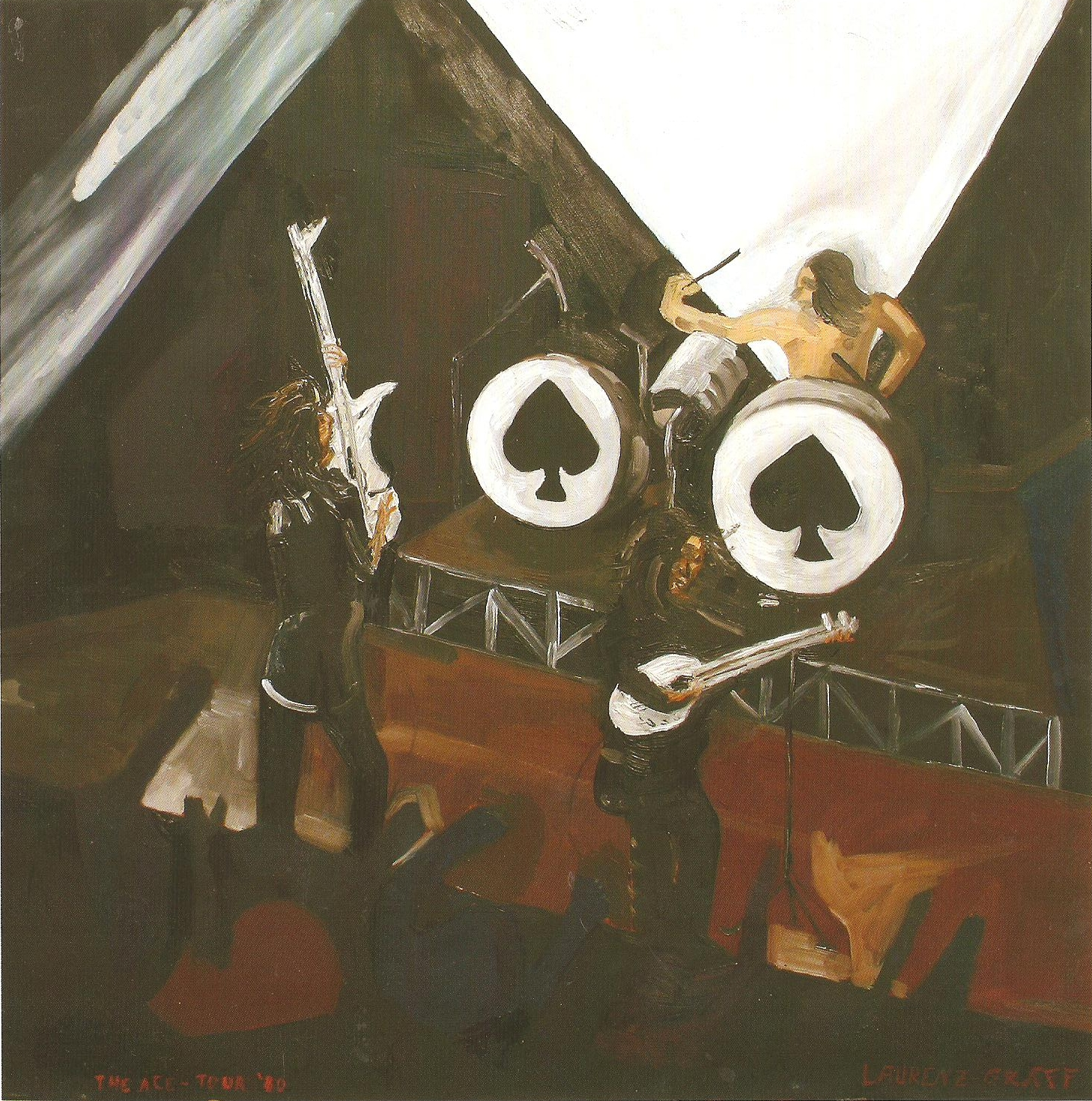
Phil Taylor (1954–2015) (right), performing with his band Motörhead in 1981, painted by Matthias Laurenz Gräff

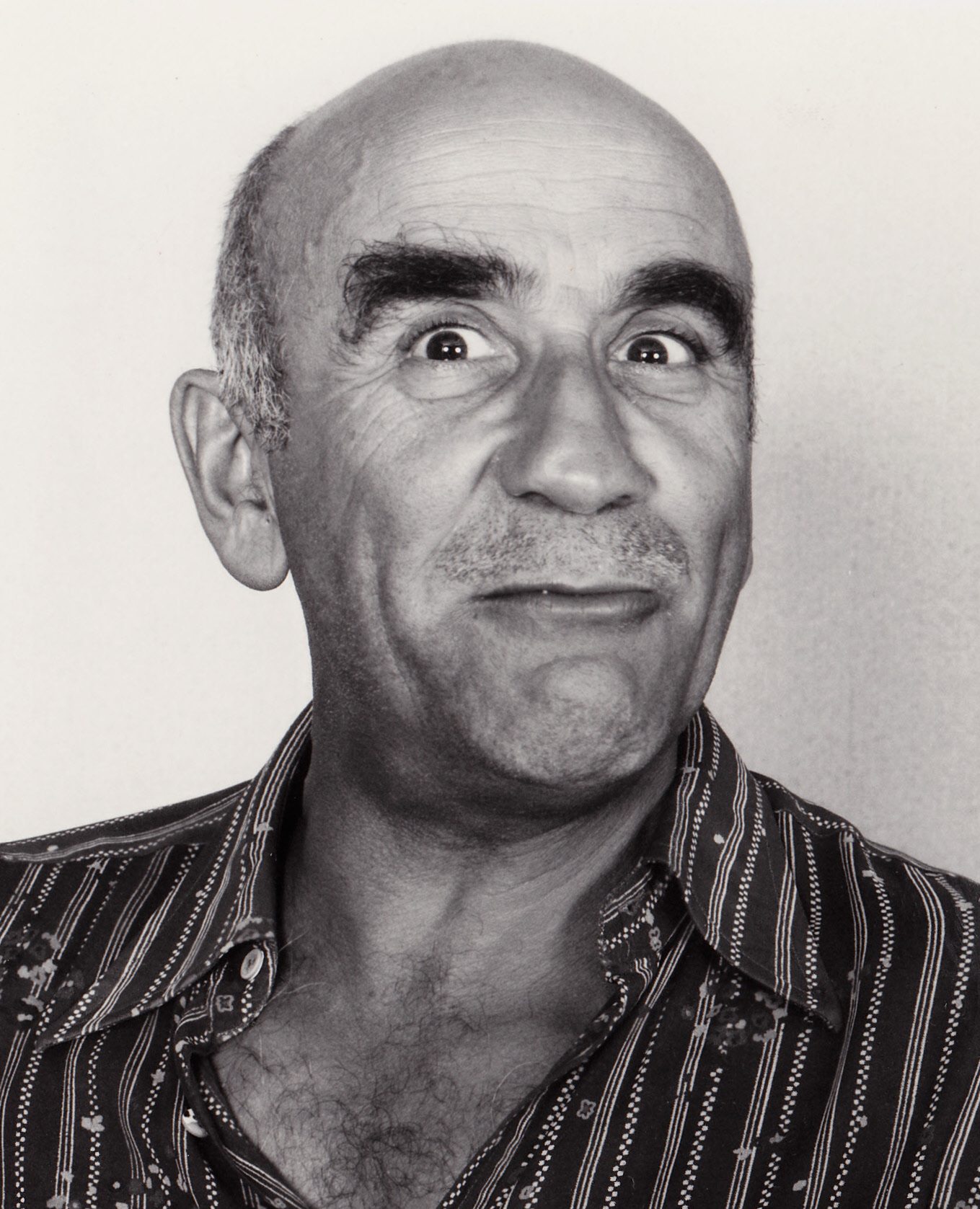
Warren Mitchell (1926–2015) in 1978

- 1 November
  - Bill Ballantine, 78, marine biologist.
  - Chris Leatherbarrow, 26, rugby league referee.
  - Stephen Hancock, 89, actor (Coronation Street).
- 2 November
  - Frank Budgen, 61, commercial director (Tag, Mountain).
  - Mike Davies, 79, tennis player.
  - Roy Dommett, 82, engineer and rocket scientist.
  - Peter Donaldson, 70, newsreader and radio broadcaster (BBC Radio 4).
  - Christopher Duggan, 57, historian.
  - Brian Lomax, football executive (Northampton Town) and founder of the Supporters Direct movement.
  - Rory MacDonald, 66, horse racing executive, MD of The British Racing School (1992–2014).
  - Arthur Shaw, 91, footballer (Arsenal).
  - Colin Welland, 81, actor (Kes, Straw Dogs) and screenwriter (Chariots of Fire).
- 3 November
  - Peter Bayley, 94, academic.
  - Tom Graveney, 88, cricketer (Gloucestershire, Worcestershire, England).
  - Paul Rose, 79, Labour politician and MP for Manchester Blackley (1964–1979).
- 4 November
  - Ian Greer, 82, political lobbyist (Cash-for-questions affair).
  - Leon Sinden, 88, actor (Taggart, Dr. Finlay's Casebook, The Avengers).
- 5 November – Brown McMaster, 66, football executive (Partick Thistle, Stenhousemuir).
- 6 November
  - Bobby Campbell, 78, footballer and football manager.
  - Jonray Sánchez-Iglesias, 32, chef.
- 7 November
  - Richard Green, 74, photographer.
  - David Shawcross, 74, footballer (Manchester City, Stockport County, Halifax Town). (death announced on this date)
- 8 November
  - Harry Clarke, 94, footballer and cricketer (Darlington).
  - Rod Davies, 85, astronomer.
  - Angad Paul, 45, manufacturing executive and film producer (Lock, Stock and Two Smoking Barrels, Snatch, The Tournament).
- 9 November
  - Brian Keighley, 67, physician and medical unionist (BMA).
  - Yolanda Sonnabend, 80, theatrical designer.
  - Andy White, 85, drummer (The Beatles).
- 10 November
  - John Carlill, 90, admiral, President of the Royal Naval College, Greenwich (1980–1982).
  - Klaus Roth, 90, mathematician, recipient of the Fields Medal (1958).
- 11 November – Phil Taylor, 61, drummer (Motörhead).
- 12 November
  - Graham Atkinson, 77, cricketer (Lancashire and Somerset).
  - Jihadi John, 26, Islamic State propagandist.
- 14 November
  - Alan Davison, 79, inorganic chemist.
  - Warren Mitchell, 89, actor (Till Death Us Do Part, Death of a Salesman).
- 15 November
  - Saeed Jaffrey, 86, actor (The Man Who Would Be King, Shatranj Ke Khilari, My Beautiful Laundrette).
  - Jackie McGugan, 76, footballer (St Mirren, Leeds United).
  - Cynthia Payne, 82, brothel keeper.
- 16 November
  - Mel Ryan, 82, cricketer (Yorkshire).
  - David Steen, 59, newspaper and magazine photographer.
- 17 November
  - Guy Buckingham, 94, engineer and automobile designer (Nota).
  - Sir John Leahy, 87, diplomat, High Commissioner to Australia (1984–1988).
  - Terence Robbins, 81, rugby union and rugby league footballer.
- 18 November
  - Redvers Kyle, 86, television continuity announcer, voice-over artist and actor.
  - Jim Slater, 86, financier.
- 19 November – Sir Naim Dangoor, 101, businessman and philanthropist.
- 20 November
  - Ronald Frankenberg, 86, British anthropologist.
  - Nancy Sandars, 101, archaeologist.
- 21 November
  - Peter Dimmock, 94, broadcaster (Sportsview).
  - Anthony Read, 80, screenwriter (Doctor Who).
- 22 November
  - Hazel Adair, 95, television writer (Crossroads, Compact, Emergency – Ward 10).
  - Robin Stewart, 69, actor (Bless This House, Cromwell, The Legend of the 7 Golden Vampires).
- 23 November – Hazel Holt, 87, novelist.
- 24 November
  - Sir Robert Ford, 91, Army general, Adjutant-General to the Forces (1978–1981).
  - John Forrester, 66, historian and philosopher of science.
  - Aubrey Sheiham, 79, dental epidemiologist.
- 25 November
  - Sir Jeremy Black, 83, Royal Navy admiral.
  - Chris Martin, 42, civil servant, Principal Private Secretary to the Prime Minister (2012–2015).
  - Beth Rogan, 84, actress (Mysterious Island).
- 27 November – Ian Dargie, 84, footballer (Brentford).
- 28 November – Gerry Byrne, 77, footballer (Liverpool, England).
- 29 November
  - Wayne Bickerton, 74, songwriter ("Nothing but a Heartache", "Sugar Baby Love"), record producer, and music executive.
  - Jonathan Janson, 85, Olympic sailor.
  - Christopher Middleton, 89, poet and translator.
- 30 November
  - Alex Kersey-Brown, 73, rugby player.
  - Nigel Buxton, 91, travel writer.
  - Marjorie Oludhe Macgoye, 87, writer.
  - Leslie Waddington, 81, art dealer.

=== December ===
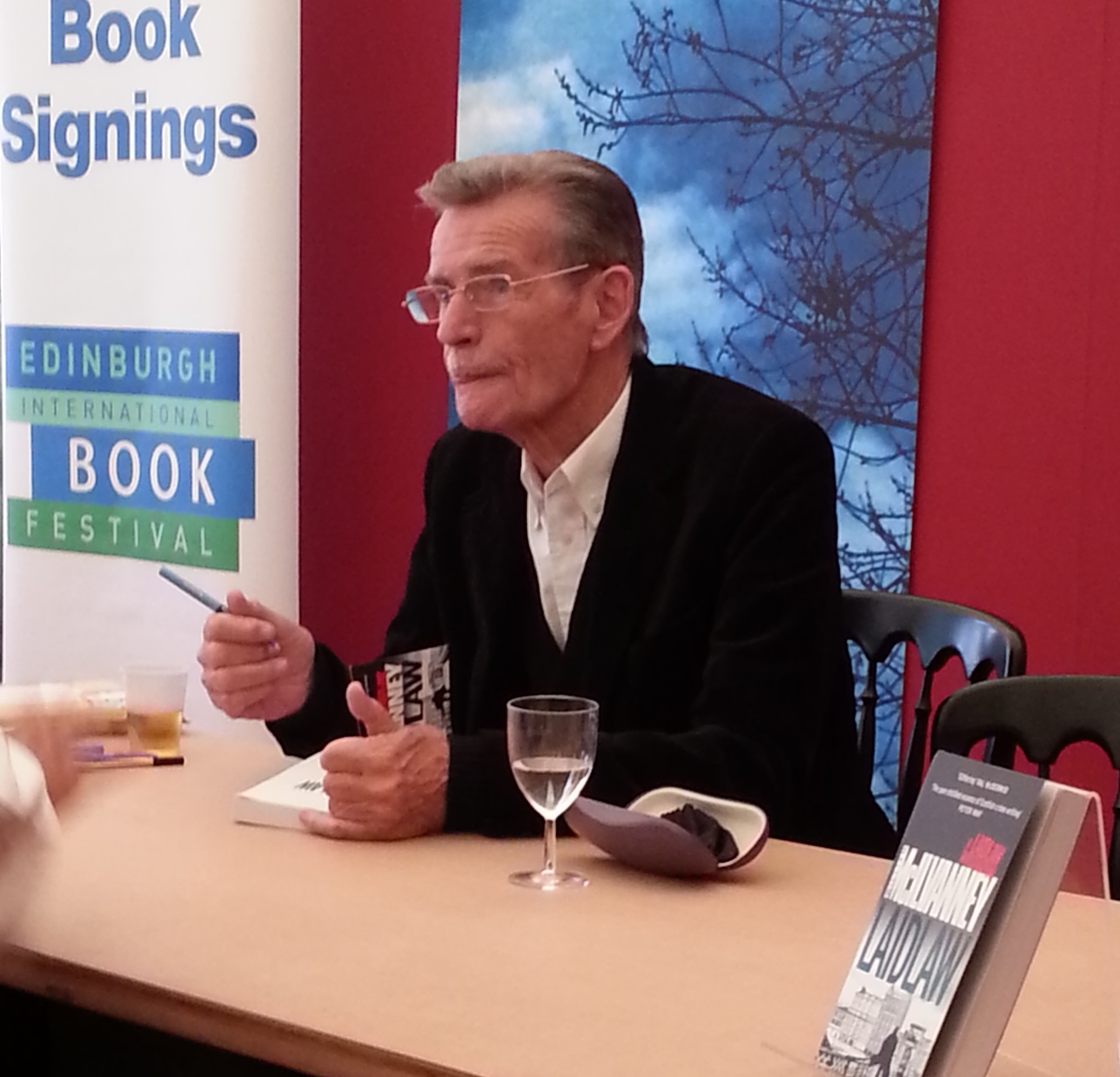
William McIlvanney (1936–2015) in 2013

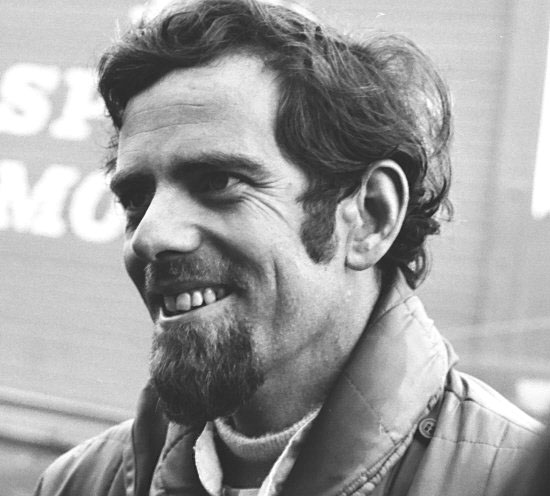
Peter Westbury (1938–2015) in 1970

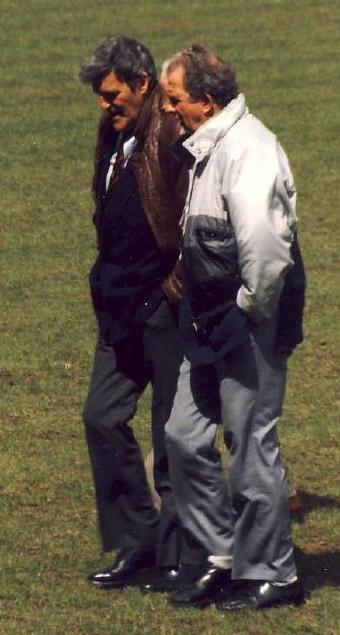
Jimmy Hill (1928–2015) (right) with Maurice Cook

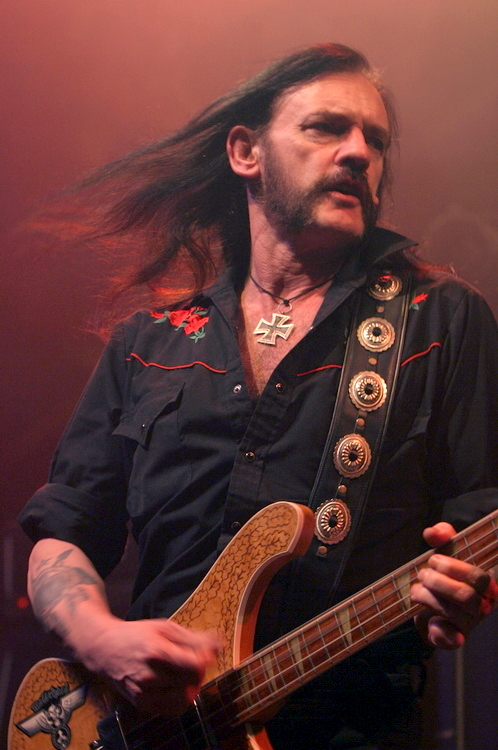
Lemmy (1945–2015) in 2005

- 2 December
  - Bryony Brind, 55, ballerina.
  - Sir John Osborn, 92, politician, MP for Sheffield Hallam (1959–1987).
  - Anthony Valentine, 76, actor (Colditz, Coronation Street, Escape to Athena).
- 4 December
  - Norman Engleback, 88, architect.
  - Henry Hall, 87, physicist.
  - Rodney Milnes, 79, opera critic.
- 5 December
  - Willie Coburn, 74, footballer (St Johnstone).
  - Peter Cochrane, 96, WWII army officer.
  - William McIlvanney, 79, writer and poet.
- 6 December
  - Ian Burns, 76, footballer (Aberdeen).
  - Mick McLaughlin, 72, footballer (Hereford United, Newport County)
  - Nicholas Smith, 81, actor (Are You Being Served?, Wallace & Gromit: The Curse of the Were-Rabbit, Doctor Who).
- 7 December
  - Kenneth Partridge, 89, interior decorator.
  - Shirley Stelfox, 74, actress (Emmerdale, Keeping Up Appearances, Coronation Street).
  - Peter Westbury, 77, racing driver.
- 8 December
  - Alan Hodgkinson, 79, footballer (Sheffield United).
  - Derek Hyatt, 84, landscape painter.
  - Johnny More, 81, impressionist (The Comedians).
  - Elsie Tu, 102, social activist, member of the Legislative Council of Hong Kong (1988–1995).
- 9 December
  - John Cockerton, 88, Anglican priest and academic.
  - Jenny Wormald, 73, historian.
- 10 December
  - Ian Bell, 59, journalist.
  - Walter Fawcett, 86, cricketer.
- 12 December
  - Jon Gadsby, 62, actor and comedian.
  - Sir Peter Gregson, 79, civil servant.
  - I. Howard Marshall, 81, theologian.
  - Ken Johnson, 87, Olympic athlete (1952).
  - John Scott-Scott, 81, aerospace engineer.
- 13 December – Don Leaver, 86, television producer (The Avengers, Prime Suspect).
- 15 December
  - Tom Arden, 54, author.
  - Joe Lancaster, 89, footballer and trainer.
  - Kathy Secker, 70, television presenter.
  - Harry Zvi Tabor, 98, physicist.
- 16 December
  - Patricia Brooker, 80, reality television personality (The Only Way is Essex).
  - Peter Dickinson, 88, author.
  - Brian Keeble, 77, footballer (Grimsby Town, Darlington).
  - Harry Scott, 78, boxer.
- 17 December – Gareth Mortimer, 66, musician (Racing Cars).
- 18 December
  - Rene Chapman, 109, centenarian and Scotland's oldest person.
  - Joe Gilmore, 93, barman.
- 19 December
  - Jimmy Hill, 87, footballer (Fulham), manager (Coventry City), trade union leader (PFA) and TV presenter (Match of the Day).
  - Harry Hyams, 87, property developer (Centre Point).
  - Greville Janner, Baron Janner of Braunstone, 87, politician, MP for Leicester West (1970–1997).
  - Alan Lee, 61, cricket and horse racing journalist.
- 22 December – Derek Ezra, Baron Ezra, 96, coal industry administrator and Chairman of the National Coal Board (1971–1982).
- 23 December
  - Henry Crichton, 6th Earl Erne, 78, nobleman.
  - Don Howe, 80, footballer (West Bromwich Albion, Arsenal, England) and coach.
  - Sir Brian Tovey, 89, civil servant, Director of the Government Communications Headquarters (1978–1983).
- 24 December – Dennis Griffiths, 82, newspaper executive (Evening Standard) and press historian.
- 26 December
  - Liam Clarke, journalist (Belfast Telegraph).
  - Ogwyn Davies, 90, painter.
  - Ed Dobson, 65, theologian.
- 27 December
  - Christopher N. L. Brooke, 88, medieval historian.
  - Andy M. Stewart, 63, folk singer (Silly Wizard).
  - Roy Swinbourne, 86, footballer (Wolverhampton Wanderers).
  - Stevie Wright, 68, singer (The Easybeats).
- 28 December
  - Ann Arnold, 79, painter.
  - John Bradbury, 62, drummer (The Specials).
  - Lemmy, 70, rock musician (Motörhead, Hawkwind).
- 29 December – Edward Hugh, 67, economist.
- 31 December
  - Geoffrey Hawthorn, 74, British sociologist.
  - Felix Pirani, 87, theoretical physicist.

== See also ==
- 2015 in British music
- 2015 in British television
- 2015 in England
- 2015 in Northern Ireland
- 2015 in Scotland
- 2015 in Wales
- List of British films of 2015
