= Deaths in February 2015 =

The following is a list of notable deaths in February 2015.

Entries for each day are listed alphabetically by surname. A typical entry lists information in the following sequence:

- Name, age, country of citizenship and reason for notability, established cause of death, reference.

== February 2015 ==
=== 1 ===
- Barbara Barletta, 62, American classical archaeologist and historian.
- Aldo Ciccolini, 89, Italian-born French pianist.
- Colum Corless, 92, Irish hurler (Galway).
- Anita Darian, 87, American singer, complications after intestinal surgery.
- Alby Duckmanton, 81, New Zealand cricket player (Canterbury) and administrator.
- William Garrison, 90, American geographer.
- Jean-Paul Gladu, 93, Canadian ice hockey player (Boston Bruins).
- Sir Douglas Hague, 88, British economist.
- Patrick Aidan Heelan, 88, Irish physicist and philosopher of science.
- Ron Johnson, 76, American basketball player (Los Angeles Lakers), aneurysm.
- Julius Ludorf, 95, German football player and coach.
- Ann Mara, 85, American football team owner (New York Giants), complications from fall.
- Isa Munayev, 49, Chechen militant, killed in the Battle of Debaltseve.
- Gordon Murray, 87, Scottish nationalist politician.
- Patrick Ngcobo, 43, South African Carnatic singer, renal failure.
- Monty Oum, 33, American animator (Red vs. Blue, RWBY) and video game designer (Afro Samurai), anaphylaxis.
- Beryl Platt, Baroness Platt of Writtle, 91, British engineer and politician.
- Kenneth Kamal Scott, 74, American performer, liver cancer.
- Viktor Shekhovtsev, 74, Russian Soviet footballer.
- Irving Singer, 89, American philosopher, professor and author.
- Jos Suijkerbuijk, 85, Dutch professional road bicycle racer.
- Marie-José Villiers, 98, British-born Belgian World War II spy and countess.

=== 2 ===
- Joseph Alfidi, 65, American pianist, composer and conductor.
- Helena Araújo, 81, Colombian writer.
- David Armytage, 85, British naval officer.
- Christian Backer-Owe, 90, Norwegian artist.
- Dave Bergman, 61, American baseball player (San Francisco Giants, Detroit Tigers), bile duct cancer.
- Tibor Bitskey, 85, Hungarian actor.
- Frank Borghi, 89, American Hall of Fame soccer player (national team).
- Sandra Chalmers, 74, British broadcaster (Woman's Hour).
- Dalmo Gaspar, 82, Brazilian footballer (Santos).
- Joop Harmans, 93, Dutch Olympic cyclist (1948), national champion (1946).
- Ken Hawkes, 81, English footballer (Luton Town).
- The Jacka, 37, American rapper, shot.
- Andriy Kuzmenko, 46, Ukrainian singer (Skryabin), traffic collision.
- Dust La Rock, 38, American artist and designer.
- Roy Little, 83, English footballer (Manchester City).
- Gloria Ricci Lothrop, 80, American historian, chronic obstructive pulmonary disease and pneumonia.
- Zane Musa, 36, American jazz saxophonist, suicide by jumping.
- Greg Nelson, 61, American computer scientist, brain cancer.
- Molade Okoya-Thomas, 79, Nigerian businessman and philanthropist.
- Karl-Erik Palmér, 85, Swedish footballer (Malmö, national team).
- Anand Shukla, 74, Indian cricketer.
- Stewart Stern, 92, American screenwriter (Rebel Without a Cause, Rachel, Rachel, Sybil), brain tumor.
- Henryk Szczepański, 81, Polish football player and coach.
- Osamu Tsurumine, 73, Japanese Olympic swimmer.

=== 3 ===
- Christophe Gbenye, 87, Congolese rebel leader.
- Sir Martin Gilbert, 78, British historian and biographer, member of the Iraq Inquiry panel.
- Akif Jafar Hajiyev, 77, Azerbaijani mathematician.
- Hay List, 9, Australian Thoroughbred racehorse, euthanised following laminitis.
- Mary Healy, 96, American singer and actress (The 5,000 Fingers of Dr. T.).
- Jim Letcavits, 79, American CFL player (Edmonton Eskimos, Montreal Alouettes), Alzheimer's disease.
- Walter Liedtke, 69, American art curator of European paintings (The Metropolitan Museum of Art), train crash.
- Sally Luther, 96, American politician, member of the Minnesota House of Representatives (1951–1962), leukemia.
- Vasu Malali, 48, Indian author and film director, cancer.
- Max Mangold, 92, German linguist.
- William Thomas McKinley, 76, American composer and jazz pianist.
- Carlos Noguera, 71, Venezuelan writer and psychologist.
- Ion Nunweiller, 79, Romanian football player and manager (Dinamo), triple Cupa României winner (1959, 1964, 1968).
- Andrew Patner, 55, American art critic and radio host.
- Michael Refalo, 78, Maltese politician and diplomat, Tourism Minister (1987–1995), High Commissioner to the United Kingdom (2005–2008).
- Ataúlfo Sánchez, 80, Argentine football player and coach.
- Nasim Hasan Shah, 85, Pakistani judge, Chief Justice (1993–1994).
- Charlie Sifford, 92, American Hall of Fame golfer, complications from a stroke.
- Koos Van Den Akker, 75, Dutch-born American fashion designer.
- Norman Yemm, 81, Australian actor (Homicide, Number 96, The Sullivans).

=== 4 ===
- Dmitry Bagryanov, 47, Russian Olympic long jumper (1992).
- Richard Bonehill, 67, British actor and stuntman (Doctor Who, Return of the Jedi, Flash Gordon).
- Ade Capone, 56, Italian cartoonist (Lazarus Ledd).
- Henryk Cegielski, 69, Polish Olympic basketball player.
- Chuang Shu-chi, 94, Taiwanese practitioner of traditional Chinese medicine.
- Wes Cooley, 82, American politician, member of the U.S. House of Representatives from Oregon (1995–1997).
- Edmund Cranch, 91, American academic.
- Henry E. Emerson, 89, American army lieutenant general.
- Rune Ericson, 90, Swedish cinematographer.
- Celina González, 85, Cuban singer and songwriter.
- Ernest Ferlita, 87, American playwright and professor of drama and speech.
- Fitzhugh L. Fulton, 89, American NASA research pilot.
- Astrid Gräfin von Hardenberg, 89, German baroness.
- Martin Green, 82, British writer and publisher.
- Graeme Hall, 72, Australian weightlifter.
- Robert E. Hanson, 67, American politician, North Dakota State Treasurer (1979–1980, 1985–1992), complications from diabetes.
- Ziad Khalaf Raja al-Karbouly, Iraqi Al-Qaeda officer, execution by hanging.
- Donald M. Kerr, 69, American wildlife biologist and conservationist (High Desert Museum).
- Eduardo Laborde, 47, Argentine rugby union player (national team), traffic collision.
- Odete Lara, 85, Brazilian actress, heart attack.
- Stanisław Makowiecki, 72, Polish Olympic wrestler (1972).
- Albert L. Nash, 93, American politician, member of the Massachusetts House of Representatives.
- Akio Nohira, 77–78, Japanese table tennis player.
- Kristian Rambjør, 76, Norwegian executive, President of Norwegian State Railways (1990–1995).
- Sajida Mubarak Atrous al-Rishawi, c. 45, Iraqi Al-Qaeda failed suicide bomber, execution by hanging.
- Jack Ruina, 91, American professor of electrical engineering.
- Monica Scattini, 59, Italian actress (Sentimental Maniacs, Nine, I'll Be Going Now), cancer.

=== 5 ===
- K. N. Choksy, 81, Sri Lankan lawyer and politician, MP (1989–2010), Minister of Finance (2001–2004).
- Henri Coppens, 84, Belgian footballer, winner of the Golden Shoe (1954).
- Marisa Del Frate, 83, Italian actress, singer and television personality, cancer.
- Val Logsdon Fitch, 91, American Nobel Prize-winning physicist (1980).
- Garey Hayden, 70, American bridge player.
- Sir Gordon Linacre, 94, English newspaper executive and bomber pilot.
- George A. Lovejoy, 83, American politician, member of the New Hampshire Senate (1992–1996).
- Louise Maheux-Forcier, 85, Canadian author.
- Elmer Matthews, 87, American politician, member of the New Jersey General Assembly.
- Windy McCall, 89, American baseball player (New York Giants).
- Richard Meryman, 88, American journalist and biographer.
- Anne Moody, 74, American author and civil rights activist.
- Herman Rosenblat, 85, Polish-born American writer.
- Mike Runnels, 69, American politician, Lieutenant Governor of New Mexico (1983–1987).
- Jeffrey Segal, 94, British actor (Fawlty Towers, Z-Cars).
- Alan Sproates, 70, English footballer (Darlington).
- Stay Gold, 20, Japanese Thoroughbred racehorse.
- Don Suman, 95, American college basketball coach (Rice Owls).
- Dagfinn Tveito, 88, Norwegian horticulturalist.
- Mario Verdial, 52, Honduran businessman, Chairman of Real España (since 2001), shot.

=== 6 ===
- André Brink, 79, South African novelist and playwright.
- Johnny Campbell, 86, English footballer (Gateshead).
- D. Michael Collins, 70, American politician, Mayor of Toledo, Ohio (since 2014).
- Carl Cunningham-Cole, 72, British ceramic artist.
- Satwant Singh Dhaliwal, 82, Malaysian geneticist.
- Assia Djebar, 78, Algerian novelist, translator and filmmaker, member of the Académie française.
- Norm Drucker, 94, American basketball referee.
- Sheila Ernst, 73, British psychotherapist.
- Kayla Mueller, 26, American activist, humanitarian aid worker, ISIS hostage.
- Alan Nunnelee, 56, American politician, member of the U.S. House of Representatives from Mississippi (since 2011), brain cancer.
- Eliezer Shlomo Schick, 74, Israeli Hasidic rabbi.
- Tetaua Taitai, 67, I-Kiribati politician and physician, Leader of the Opposition, cancer.
- Kathrine Windfeld, 48, Danish film director (Hamilton: In the Interest of the Nation), brain tumour.
- Ray Wolfinger, 83, American political scientist.
- Pedro León Zapata, 85, Venezuelan cartoonist, painter and writer.

=== 7 ===
- Richard Austin, 60, Jamaican cricketer.
- Billy Casper, 83, American Hall of Fame golfer, 51 career PGA Tour wins, complications from pneumonia.
- Donald H. Clausen, 91, American politician, U.S. Representative from California (1963–1983).
- Nita Cunningham, 75, Australian politician, member of the Legislative Assembly of Queensland (1998–2006).
- Gustavo Couttolenc, 93, Mexican translator and academic.
- Joseph M. Gaydos, 88, American politician, member of the House of Representatives (1968–1993), Pennsylvania Senate (1967–1968).
- Darwin Gonnerman, 68, Canadian football player.
- Earl Johnson, 83, Canadian ice hockey player (Detroit Red Wings).
- Robert Gavron, Baron Gavron, 84, British businessman and philanthropist, Labour life peer, heart attack.
- Adam Grad, 45, Polish footballer.
- René Lavand, 86, Argentine magician and illusionist.
- Joe B. Mauldin, 74, American bassist (The Crickets), cancer.
- George Muchai, 59, Kenyan politician, MP for Kabete (since 2013), shot.
- Brian Reynolds, 82, English cricketer (Northamptonshire).
- Gilles Rhéaume, 63, Canadian Quebec independence activist.
- José de Rocha, 78, Portuguese Olympic sprinter.
- Marshall Rosenberg, 80, American psychologist, creator of Nonviolent Communication.
- Joe Simenic, 91, American baseball researcher and historian.
- Dean Smith, 83, American Hall of Fame basketball coach (North Carolina).
- Gordon Stone, 100, Australian rugby union player.
- Paul E. Toms, 90, American author and pastor.
- John C. Whitehead, 92, American financier (Goldman Sachs) and civil servant, U.S. Deputy Secretary of State (1985–1989).
- L. Pearce Williams, 87, American academic (Cornell University).

=== 8 ===
- John W. Baldwin, 85, American historian.
- Ola Bratteli, 68, Norwegian mathematician.
- Stan Cowan, 83, Scottish rugby league player (Hull).
- David William Crews, 81, American politician, member of the Texas House of Representatives (1960–1968).
- Kenji Ekuan, 85, Japanese industrial designer (Kikkoman soy sauce dispenser), heart disorder.
- Vincent Valentine Ezeonyia, 73, Nigerian Roman Catholic prelate, Bishop of Aba (since 1990).
- Jesse Freitas Jr., 63, American football player (San Diego Chargers).
- John Hart, 93, English ballet dancer and artistic director (Ballet West).
- Dave Hoyda, 57, Canadian ice hockey player (Philadelphia Flyers, Winnipeg Jets).
- Debra A. Kemp, 57, American author (The Firebrand).
- Rauni-Leena Luukanen-Kilde, 75, Finnish parapsychologist.
- Nicholas Mackintosh, 79, British experimental psychologist.
- Engracia Pastora Pérez Yépez, 104, Venezuelan culinary artisan (b. 1910)
- Ivan Roots, 93, British historian.
- Andrew Rosenfeld, 52, British businessman.
- Clyde W. Sare, 78, American politician, member of the Oklahoma House of Representatives (1959–1963).
- Müzeyyen Senar, 96, Turkish singer, pneumonia.
- Nick Sharkey, 71, English footballer (Sunderland).
- John J. Shea Jr., 90, American physician.
- Oscar Stenström, 36, Finnish racing cyclist.
- Mario Vázquez Raña, 82, Mexican businessman and sports administrator, cancer.
- Sir David Watson, 65, British academic and educationalist (University of Oxford).
- Thom Wilson, American punk rock producer.
- Ralph Yelton, 88, American politician, member of the Tennessee House of Representatives (1977–1989).

=== 9 ===
- Abdul Rauf Aliza, 33, Afghan IS recruiter, Taliban commander, airstrike.
- Øyvind Bjorvatn, 83, Norwegian politician, leader of the Liberal People's Party (1982–1986).
- Horst Borcherding, 84, German footballer (Saarland national team).
- Ken Cunningham, 71, American college basketball player and coach.
- Roman Frister, 87, Polish-Israeli journalist and Holocaust survivor.
- Liu Han, 49, Chinese billionaire mining tycoon, execution.
- Donald J. Harlin, 79, American major general.
- Roy Harris, 83, British linguist.
- Frederic M. Hudson, 80, American philosopher.
- Jon Jerde, 75, American architect.
- Marvin David Levy, 82, American composer.
- Apirana Mahuika, 80, New Zealand Māori leader (Ngāti Porou).
- Drew McDonald, 59, Scottish professional wrestler, cancer.
- Samuel H. Moffett, 98, American Korean theologian and missionary.
- Charlie O'Connell, 79, American roller derby skater.
- Valeri Poluyanov, 71, Russian Soviet-era footballer.
- Rex Ray, 58, American graphic designer and artist, lymphoma.
- Nadia Röthlisberger-Raspe, 42, Swiss curler, Olympic silver medalist (2002) and Paralympic coach, bone cancer.
- Claude Ruel, 76, Canadian ice hockey coach (Montreal Canadiens).
- Ed Sabol, 98, American filmmaker, founder of NFL Films.
- Jorge Sassi, 67, Argentine actor, renal failure.
- Richard Sher, 66, American broadcaster (Says You!).
- Grant Strate, 87, Canadian dancer, cancer.
- Melanie Tem, 65, American horror and dark fantasy author, breast cancer.
- Max Yalden, 84, Canadian civil servant and diplomat.

=== 10 ===
- Naseer Aruri, 81, Palestinian scholar and human rights activist, Parkinson's disease.
- Karl Josef Becker, 86, German Roman Catholic theologian, Cardinal-Deacon of San Giuliano Martire (since 2012).
- Abdul Ghafoor Bhurgri, 94, Pakistani lawyer, author and politician.
- Daniel Brand, 79, American wrestler.
- Deng Liqun, 99, Chinese politician.
- Sir Noel Davies, 81, British chief executive (Vickers).
- Wayne Dobbs, 75, American college basketball coach (Vanderbilt University).
- Bill Enyart, 67, American football player (Buffalo Bills), cancer.
- John Fox, 90, British composer and conductor.
- Matías Funes, 62, Honduran philosopher, professor, and presidential candidate, pancreatic cancer.
- Don Johnson, 88, American baseball player (New York Yankees, Washington Senators), kidney failure.
- Sir William Lawrence, 5th Baronet, 60, British aristocrat and politician.
- Corinne Le Poulain, 66, French actress, cancer.
- Bernard Marie, 96, French rugby league referee and politician, member of the National Assembly (1967–1981).
- Tom McQueen, 85, Scottish footballer (Accrington Stanley, Hibernian).
- Dane A. Miller, 68, American business executive.
- Anne Naysmith, 77, British concert pianist, traffic collision.
- Michael Raupach, 64, Australian climatologist.
- Pat Rogan, 78, Australian politician.
- Roman Sidorov, 59, Russian footballer.
- Bobby Towns, 76, American football player.
- Manfred Wagner, 76, German footballer (1860 Munich).

=== 11 ===
- John Beresford, 8th Marquess of Waterford, 81, Irish aristocrat.
- Abel Costas Montaño, 94, Bolivian Roman Catholic prelate, Bishop of Tarija (1974–1995).
- Anne Cuneo, 78, Swiss author and film director.
- Rudolf Fila, 82, Slovak painter.
- Betty Foulk, 77, American sailor.
- Gary Glick, 84, American football player (Pittsburgh Steelers).
- Christopher Greener, 71, British basketball player and actor (The Elephant Man).
- Roger Hanin, 89, French actor and film director.
- Ray Hathaway, 98, American baseball player (Brooklyn Dodgers).
- Tama Huata, 64, New Zealand Māori performing arts leader.
- Carroll Huntress, 91, American football coach.
- Tancred Ibsen Jr., 93, Norwegian diplomat.
- Gus Moffat, 66, English football player and coach.
- John E. Murray Jr., 82, American educator, President of Duquesne University (1988–2001), heart attack.
- Ricardo Palacios, 74, Spanish film actor and director (The Man Called Noon, Socrates), heart failure.
- Bob Simon, 73, American television journalist (60 Minutes), traffic collision.
- Jerry Tarkanian, 84, American Hall of Fame basketball coach (Long Beach State, UNLV, San Antonio Spurs, Fresno State).

=== 12 ===
- Idriss Arnaoud Ali, 69, Djiboutian politician.
- Sam Andrew, 73, American musician (Big Brother and the Holding Company), complication after open heart surgery.
- David Carr, 58, American columnist (The New York Times) and author, lung cancer.
- Movita Castaneda, 98, American actress (Mutiny on the Bounty), neck injury.
- John P. Craven, 90, American scientist.
- Désiré Dondeyne, 93, French composer.
- Rhonda Glenn, 68, American sportscaster (ESPN, ABC) and golf historian, cancer.
- Harvey Goldschmid, 74, American legal scholar and SEC commissioner.
- Alison Gordon, 72, Canadian sports journalist, lung ailment.
- Cornelis Pieter van den Hoek, 93, Dutch resistance fighter, recipient of the Military William Order.
- Christopher Horton, 76, New Zealand sharebroker.
- John-Edward Kelly, 56, American conductor and saxophonist.
- Jean Lechantre, 92, Belgian-born French international footballer.
- Mosie Lister, 93, American gospel music singer-songwriter (The Statesmen Quartet).
- Anthony Low, 87, British historian.
- Nik Abdul Aziz Nik Mat, 84, Malaysian politician, Menteri Besar of Kelantan (1990–2013).
- Tomie Ohtake, 101, Japanese-born Brazilian artist, heart failure.
- Gary Owens, 80, American television announcer (Rowan & Martin's Laugh-In) and voice actor (Space Ghost, Garfield and Friends), diabetes.
- Richie Pratt, 71, American jazz drummer.
- Oliver Rackham, 75, British landscape ecologist.
- Ernest J. Sternglass, 91, American physicist and professor, heart failure.
- George H. Storck, 84, American football coach.
- Steve Strange, 55, British musician (Visage), heart attack.
- Mike Thresh, 84, British plant pathologist.
- LeRoy Woodson, 70, American photojournalist.

=== 13 ===
- Faith Bandler, 96, Australian civil rights activist.
- Bob Bettisworth, 88, American politician, member of the Alaska House of Representatives (1979–1985).
- Thomas Bhalerao, 82, Indian Roman Catholic prelate, Bishop of Nashik (1987–2007).
- Stan Chambers, 91, American television reporter (KTLA).
- Tony Charles, 79, Welsh professional wrestler (NWA).
- Geneviève Dormann, 81, French journalist and writer.
- John Robert Evans, 85, Canadian paediatrician and academic.
- Kete Ioane, 64, Cook Islands politician, MP for Vaipae-Tautu (1999–2010), Cabinet Minister (2008–2009).
- John McCabe, 75, British composer and pianist.
- Jim McCusker, 78, American football player (Philadelphia Eagles).
- James Montgomery, 80, Canadian Olympic boxer.
- Magnus Mwalunyungu, 84, Tanzanian Roman Catholic prelate, Bishop of Tunduru-Masasi (1992–2005).
- Albert Nijenhuis, 88, Dutch-born American mathematician.
- Nguyễn Bá Thanh, 61, Vietnamese politician, member of Central Committee of the Communist Party.
- Dan Tunstall Pedoe, 75, British cardiologist.
- Kesava Reddy, 68, Indian novelist.
- Hugh Walters, 75, British actor (Doctor Who).
- Gerald Willis, 75, American politician, member of the Alabama House of Representatives.

=== 14 ===
- Kalim Aajiz, 95, Indian author and academic.
- Keith Copeland, 68, American jazz drummer.
- Pamela Cundell, 95, English actress (Dad's Army, EastEnders, A Fantastic Fear of Everything).
- Bernd Dost, 75, German journalist.
- Michele Ferrero, 89, Italian businessman (Ferrero SpA).
- Sheila Girling, 90, British artist.
- Helen Glass, 97, Canadian nurse and administrator.
- Philip Godana, Kenyan politician, MP for Moyale, shot.
- Maureen Guy, 82, Welsh mezzo-soprano singer.
- John D. Hargreaves, 91, British historian.
- Britta Hasso, 79, Swedish actress and journalist.
- Egon Horst, 76, German footballer (Schalke 04, Hamburger SV).
- Alan Howard, 77, English actor (The Lord of the Rings), pneumonia.
- Hulon, 58, American jazz saxophonist and physician.
- Louis Jourdan, 93, French actor (Letter from an Unknown Woman, Gigi, Octopussy).
- Asbjørn Kjønstad, 72, Norwegian legal scholar.
- Philip Levine, 87, American Pulitzer Prize-winning poet, pancreatic cancer.
- Philippe Massoni, 79, French prefect, Representative Co-Prince of Andorra (2002–2007).
- Ammouri Mbarek, 63, Moroccan musician, cancer.
- Franjo Mihalić, 94, Croatian Yugoslav long-distance runner, Olympic silver medalist (1956).
- Finn Nørgaard, 55, Danish film director, shot.
- Richard Perham, 77, English molecular biologist.
- Wim Ruska, 74, Dutch judoka, Olympic champion (1972).
- James H. Schwartz, 87, American politician.
- Barbara Smith, 68, American LGBT rights activist.
- Hans Jürgen Teuteberg, 85, German historian.
- Thio Him Tjiang, 85, Indonesian footballer.
- Gerson Veii, 76, Namibian politician.

=== 15 ===
- Haron Amin, 46, Afghan diplomat, Ambassador to Japan (2004–2009), cancer.
- George Attla, 81, American sprint dog musher.
- Sergio Blanco, 66, Spanish singer (Sergio y Estíbaliz).
- Barbara Darling, 67, Australian Anglican prelate, stroke.
- Arnaud de Borchgrave, 88, American journalist (The Washington Times), bladder cancer.
- Eileen Essell, 92, English actress (Duplex, Charlie and the Chocolate Factory, The Producers).
- Robert France, 54, Jamaican-born American computer scientist.
- José María Hernández, 55, Spanish politician, President of the Provincial Deputation of Palencia (since 2011).
- Leo Jordan, 85, Canadian politician, Ontario MPP (1990–1999).
- Wendell Kim, 64, American baseball player and coach (San Francisco Giants, Chicago Cubs, Boston Red Sox), Alzheimer's disease.
- Mikhail Koulakov, 82, Russian abstract painter.
- Ike Lassiter, 74, American football player (Oakland Raiders, Denver Broncos, New England Patriots).
- Bruce A. McIntosh, 85, Canadian astrophysicist.
- Steve Montador, 35, Canadian ice hockey player (Calgary Flames, Florida Panthers, Buffalo Sabres).
- Jacob Stolt-Nielsen, 83, Norwegian businessman (Stolt-Nielsen).
- John Treadgold, 83, British Anglican priest, Dean of Chichester (1989–2001).

=== 16 ===
- Wilhelm Baumann, 89, German politician.
- Meli Bolobolo, 51, Fijian tribal chief and academic.
- Lasse Braun, 78, Italian pornographic film director and producer, complications from diabetes.
- Carlos de Castro, 35, Uruguayan footballer, complications from surgery.
- Gavin Clark, 46, British singer (UNKLE, Clayhill).
- John Davies, 76, Welsh historian.
- Robin Duff, 67, New Zealand education leader and gay rights activist, complications from surgery.
- Clyde Duncan, 54, American football player (St. Louis Cardinals).
- Brett Ewins, 59, British comic book artist (Judge Dredd, 2000 AD, Bad Company), emphysema.
- Lesley Gore, 68, American singer ("It's My Party", "Judy's Turn to Cry", "You Don't Own Me"), lung cancer.
- Celia Lashlie, 61, New Zealand prison officer, social justice advocate and author, pancreatic cancer.
- Alexander Melentyev, 60, Soviet Russian sport shooter, Olympic champion (1980).
- Geoff Morris, 66, English footballer (Walsall).
- Tynnetta Muhammad, 73, American journalist, member of the Nation of Islam.
- Uri Orbach, 54, Israeli writer, journalist and politician.
- R. R. Patil, 57, Indian politician, oral cancer.
- Rajinder Puri, 80, Indian cartoonist and political activist.
- Lorena Rojas, 44, Mexican actress (Como en el cine, El Cuerpo del Deseo), singer and songwriter, breast cancer.
- Jerzy Samp, 63, Polish historian.
- Olga Törös, 100, Hungarian gymnast, Olympic bronze medalist (1936).
- Feliks Tych, 85, Polish historian, director of the Jewish Historical Institute (1995–2006).
- Sir Robert Wade-Gery, 85, British diplomat, High Commissioner to India (1982–1987).
- Evan Walker, 79, Australian politician, member of the Victorian Legislative Council for Melbourne (1979–1992), Parkinson's disease.
- Heinrich Windelen, 93, German politician, member of the Bundestag (1957–1990).

=== 17 ===
- John Barrow, 79, American CFL football player (Hamilton Tiger-Cats).
- Alberto Coramini, 70, Italian footballer.
- Joseph Devellerez Thaung Shwe, 79, Burmese Roman Catholic prelate, Bishop of Pyay (1975–2010).
- Richard Alan Enslen, 83, American federal judge, U.S. District Court Justice for the Western District of Michigan (since 1979).
- June Fairchild, 68, American actress (Up in Smoke), liver cancer.
- John Hurt Fisher, 95, American literary scholar.
- Andreas Garyfallos, 83/84, Greek Olympian.
- Aleksander Habela, 81, Polish Olympic bobsledder.
- Junetta Jones, 78, American operatic soprano.
- Andrzej Koszewski, 92, Polish composer.
- Antonio Lanfranchi, 68, Italian Roman Catholic prelate, Archbishop-Abbot of Modena-Nonantola (since 2010).
- Liu Yudi, 91, Chinese Air Force lieutenant general.
- George Mackie, Baron Mackie of Benshie, 95, British politician, Liberal Democrat life peer.
- Henri Martin, 87, French political activist (Henri Martin affair).
- Juanita Moody, 90, American cryptographer and intelligence analyst.
- Juhani Salakka, 64, Finnish Olympic weightlifter.
- Cathy Ubels-Veen, 86, Dutch politician, member of the House of Representatives (1982–1986).
- K. Swami Veerabahu, 66, Sri Lankan politician, cancer.

=== 18 ===
- Dan Archdeacon, 60, American graph theorist.
- Doug Armstrong, 83, New Zealand television sports presenter and politician, Mayor of Rodney District (1992–2000).
- Cass Ballenger, 88, American politician, member of United States House of Representatives from North Carolina (1986–2005).
- Mele Carroll, 50, American politician, member of Hawaii House of Representatives (2005–2015), cancer.
- Dave Cloud, 58, American musician, complications from melanoma.
- Georges Corbel, 72, French Olympic hockey player.
- Claude Criquielion, 58, Belgian cyclist, UCI World Road Race champion (1984), complications from a stroke.
- Mark Fischer, 64, American intellectual property lawyer.
- Robert B. Fulton, 104, American Navy rear admiral.
- Elchanan Heilprin, 93, Slovak-born English rabbi.
- John Paul Jackson, 64, American writer and producer, complications from leg sarcoma.
- Jerome Kersey, 52, American basketball player (Portland Trail Blazers), pulmonary embolism.
- Väinö Kuisma, 80, Finnish Olympic athlete.
- Józef Kurek, 82, Polish ice hockey player.
- Liu Jianli, 58, Chinese Olympic basketball player.
- Walter G. May, 96, Canadian-born American engineer.
- Mats Olausson, 54, Swedish keyboard player (Yngwie Malmsteen).
- Billy Ott, 74, American baseball player (Chicago Cubs).
- D. Ramanaidu, 78, Indian film producer, prostate cancer.
- Buck Rinehart, 68, American politician, Mayor of Columbus, Ohio (1984–1992), pancreatic cancer.
- Hans F. Zacher, 86, German academic, President of the Max Planck Society (1990–1996).

=== 19 ===
- Ivan Davidov, 71, Bulgarian footballer (PFC Slavia Sofia).
- Dennis Davis, 88, British mountaineer.
- Gérard Ducarouge, 73, French Formula One car designer.
- Peter Albert Dueck, 91, Canadian politician, member of the Legislative Assembly of British Columbia (1986–1993).
- Sir Wren Hoskyns, 59, British pediatrician, injuries sustained in fall.
- Harold Johnson, 86, American boxer, NBA/World Light Heavyweight Champion (1961–1963).
- Yutaka Katayama, 105, Japanese automotive executive (Nissan).
- Erwin Marquit, 88, American physicist and Marxist philosopher.
- Nirad Mohapatra, 67, Indian film director (Maya Miriga), cardiac arrest.
- Rafael Orozco, 92, Mexican footballer (Guadalajara).
- Frank Prendergast, 81, Irish politician, TD (1982–1987), Mayor of Limerick (1977–1978, 1984–1985), cancer.
- Frank Ramírez, 65, Colombian actor (La estrategia del caracol, Metástasis), Parkinson's disease.
- Lisette Schulman, 63, Swedish television host and politician.
- Carol Severance, 71, American fantasy author.
- Mudaffar Sjah, 79, Indonesian politician, Sultan of Ternate (since 1975).
- Warren Thomson, 79, Australian pianist.
- Talus Taylor, 82, American writer, co-creator of the Barbapapa series.
- Harris Wittels, 30, American television producer and writer (Parks and Recreation, The Sarah Silverman Program, Eastbound & Down), heroin overdose.
- R. Norman Wood, 84, American ice hockey player (Harvard Crimson).
- Gary Woods, 60, American baseball player (Toronto Blue Jays, Chicago Cubs) and scout (Chicago White Sox), heart attack.

=== 20 ===
- Nael al-Ajlouni, Jordanian politician, Health Minister (1998).
- Ibrahim Biogradlić, 83, Bosnian Yugoslav footballer, Olympic silver medalist (1956).
- Gérard Calvi, 92, French film composer (Asterix the Gaul).
- Errold La Frantz, 95, Australian cricket player, administrator, and commentator.
- Khalaf Masa'deh, Jordanian politician, Justice Minister (1999).
- Wayne Moore, 83, American swimmer, Olympic gold medalist (1952).
- Patricia Norris, 83, American costume designer (12 Years a Slave, The Elephant Man, Scarface).
- Bjørg Løhner Øien, 86, Norwegian Olympic figure skater.
- Govind Pansare, 81, Indian political activist and author, shot.
- Thérèse Quentin, 85, French actress.
- Henry Segerstrom, 91, American entrepreneur.
- Jack Symons, 90, Australian rules footballer (Essendon).
- Dick Triptow, 92, American basketball player.
- Markku Tuokko, 63, Finnish Olympic discus thrower and shot putter (1976, 1980).
- Hawley Waterman, 84, American college football and lacrosse coach.
- Sandy Whitelaw, 84, British film producer and executive.
- John C. Willke, 89, American physician and anti-abortion activist.

=== 21 ===
- Frank Bathgate, 85, Canadian ice hockey player (New York Rangers).
- Mohamed El Gourch, 79, Moroccan Olympic cyclist (1960), Tour du Maroc winner (1960, 1964, 1965), heart attack.
- Meredydd Evans, 95, Welsh professor, musician and television producer.
- Sami Farag, 79, Egyptian judge.
- Sir Anthony Grabham, 84, British surgeon and army officer.
- Aleksei Gubarev, 83, Russian Soviet-era cosmonaut.
- John Knapp-Fisher, 83, English painter.
- Mykhaylo Koman, 86, Ukrainian football player and coach (Dynamo Kyiv).
- Robert O. Marshall, 75, American convicted murderer, arranged contract killing of his wife.
- Paul Napier, 84, American actor (Dynasty).
- George Onorato, 86, American politician, member of the New York Senate (1983–2010).
- Christopher Price, 83, British politician, MP for Birmingham Perry Barr (1966–1970) and Lewisham West (1974–1983).
- Luca Ronconi, 81, Italian actor, theater director and opera director.
- Bruce Sinofsky, 58, American documentary filmmaker (Paradise Lost, Metallica: Some Kind of Monster), diabetes.
- Sadeq Tabatabaei, 71, Iranian politician, Deputy Prime Minister (1979–1980), lung cancer.
- Clark Terry, 94, American jazz trumpeter and flugelhornist, diabetes.
- Daniel Topolski, 69, British rowing coach and commentator.
- Heinz Weifenbach, 75, German ice hockey executive.
- Bernardo Enrique Witte, 88, German-born Argentinian Roman Catholic prelate, Bishop of La Rioja (1977–1992) and Concepción (1992–2001).

=== 22 ===
- Erik Amundsen, 78, Norwegian jazz musician.
- Pasquale Carminucci, 77, Italian gymnast, Olympic bronze medallist (1960).
- Roger Cecil, 72, Welsh painter, hypothermia.
- Scott Dietterick, 74, American politician.
- Ursel Finger, 85, German Olympic sprinter.
- Bruce Haynam, 83, American baseball player (Michigan Wolverines).
- Ivan Jones, 72, Australian rugby league player (South Sydney Rabbitohs).
- Dzhangir Kerimov, 91, Azerbaijani-born Russian legal scholar.
- Kim Kyung-roul, 34, South Korean professional billiards player, fall.
- Jos Lambrechts, 78, Belgian Olympic sprinter.
- Rudy Mosbergen, 85, Singaporean Olympic hockey player.
- Nicholas Mrosovsky, 80, Romanian-born Canadian zoologist, complications from Parkinson's disease.
- Donald C. Parker, 76, American physician and amateur astronomer, lung cancer.
- Chris Rainbow, 68, Scottish rock musician (The Alan Parsons Project), complications from Parkinson's disease.
- Renato Rocha, 53, Brazilian bassist and songwriter (Legião Urbana), cardiac arrest.
- John Rucho, 92, American politician, member of the Massachusetts House of Representatives (1973–1979).
- Carmine Schiavone, 71, Italian criminal, member of the Casalesi clan.

=== 23 ===
- James Aldridge, 96, Australian-born British writer (The Sea Eagle).
- Rana Bhagwandas, 72, Pakistani judge, acting Chief Justice (2007), cardiac arrest after heart ailment.
- William Bonsall, 91, American Olympic gymnast.
- Emidio Cavigioli, 89, Italian Olympic footballer.
- Haim Corfu, 94, Israeli politician, Transportation Minister (1981–1988).
- Abdelaziz Ben Dhia, 78, Tunisian politician.
- Bill Dykes, 89, American politician, member of the Louisiana State Senate (1976–1984).
- Bobby Emmons, 72, American keyboardist.
- David Freeman, 86, English solicitor.
- Maria Golovnina, 34, Russian journalist, Reuters bureau chief for Afghanistan and Pakistan, asphyxiation.
- Algimantas Kezys, 86, Lithuanian-born American photographer.
- King of Kings, 20, Irish Thoroughbred racehorse, heart failure.
- Andy King, 72, Scottish footballer (Kilmarnock).
- Jim King, 82, American baseball player (Washington Senators, Chicago Cubs).
- Jerry Lambert, 74, American jockey.
- Gerald Lockwood, 87, English rugby league player.
- Ted Roberts, 83, Australian screenwriter and producer.
- John Rowlands, 76, Welsh author and novelist.
- R. C. Sakthi, 76, Indian film director and actor.
- Audrey Sutherland, 94, American travel writer.
- Charles Trieschmann, 94, American author, photographer, and film director (Two), brain cancer.
- Jaime Vásquez, 85, Chilean footballer.
- Dave Williams, 72, Welsh football player and coach (Newport County).
- Ben Woolf, 34, American actor (American Horror Story, Insidious), traffic collision.

=== 24 ===
- Rakhat Aliyev, 52, Kazakh politician and diplomat, hanging.
- Francis Némé Baïssari, 81, Lebanese Maronite Catholic hierarch, Auxiliary Bishop of Patriarch (1991–2011).
- Robert Belfour, 74, American blues musician.
- Joe Beltrami, 83, British lawyer.
- Mayandi Bharathi, 98, Indian political activist.
- Léon Close, 83, Belgian footballer.
- Roland Gerber, 61, German football coach and player.
- Tyzen Hsiao, 77, Taiwanese composer.
- Maurice Hurley, 75, American television writer and producer (Star Trek: The Next Generation, Baywatch, Miami Vice).
- Margaret Johnson, 77, Australian Olympic athlete.
- Irving Kahn, 109, American investor.
- Donald Keough, 88, American businessman, President of The Coca-Cola Company (1981–1993).
- Methodius Kudriakov, 65, Ukrainian Orthodox hierarch, Metropolitan of Kyiv and Primate of the UAOC (since 2000).
- Suzuka Mambo, 13, Japanese thoroughbred racehorse, heart failure.
- Dori J. Maynard, 56, American journalist, lung cancer.
- Tatsuo Miyao, 87, Japanese Olympic cross-country skier.
- Dame Thea Muldoon, 87, New Zealand community servant.
- Said Sheikh Samatar, 71, Somali scholar and writer.
- Gary Sittler, 62, Canadian ice hockey player.
- Bertrice Small, 77, American author, renal failure.
- Tony Small, 84, New Zealand diplomat.
- Ryder Syvertsen, 73, American author.
- Gerald Turkewitz, 81, American psychologist, complications from a fall.
- Geoffrey Owen Whittaker, 83, British civil servant, Governor of Anguilla (1987–1989).

=== 25 ===
- Thérèse Aillaud, 83, French politician.
- Hannes Baldauf, 76, German football player and coach.
- Harve Bennett, 84, American producer and writer (Star Trek, The Six Million Dollar Man, The Mod Squad), embolism.
- Robert Brisart, 61, Belgian philosopher.
- Ariel Camacho, 22, Mexican singer, traffic collision.
- Marie Cathcart, Countess Cathcart, 91, British peeress.
- Eugenie Clark, 92, American ichthyologist.
- Terry Gill, 75, British-born Australian actor (Crocodile Dundee, Prisoner, The Flying Doctors), lung cancer.
- Agnes Griffith, 45, Grenadian Olympic sprinter.
- Liu Dongdong, 69, Chinese general.
- Herbert P. McLaughlin, 80, American architect.
- Charles E. Rice, 83, American legal scholar and author.
- Giacomo Rondinella, 91, Italian singer and actor.
- Clarence E. Singletary, 96, American judge and politician.
- Ray Smallman, 85, British metallurgist.
- Marian Szeja, 73, Polish footballer, Olympic champion (1972).
- Mauno Valkeinen, 85, Finnish Olympic swimmer.
- A. Vincent, 86, Indian cinematographer (Prem Nagar) and director (Bhargavi Nilayam).
- Victor Watson, 86, British executive (Waddingtons), Parkinson's disease.

=== 26 ===
- Jessica Ainscough, 30, Australian alternative therapy campaigner, cancer.
- Bob Braithwaite, 89, British trap shooter, Olympic champion (1968).
- Eduard Budil, 90, Austrian Olympic equestrian.
- Anthony R. Cucci, 92, American politician, Mayor of Jersey City (1985–1989).
- Brian Cumby, 64, British shipwright.
- Ruth Denison, 92, German-born American Buddhist teacher, stroke.
- Oscar Díaz, 32, American welterweight boxer, head injury.
- Angelo Raffaele Dinardo, 83, Italian politician, President of Basilicata (1995–2000).
- Sadiq Fakir, 47, Pakistani singer, traffic collision.
- Ron Foster, 85, American actor (Highway Patrol, House of the Damned, Ma Barker's Killer Brood).
- Monroe H. Freedman, 86, American professor of law, chronic lymphocytic lymphoma.
- Sheppard Frere, 98, British historian and archaeologist.
- Theodore Hesburgh, 97, American Roman Catholic priest, President of the University of Notre Dame (1952–1987).
- Nadia Hilou, 61, Israeli social worker and politician, first Arab-Christian member of Knesset (2006–2009).
- Per Olof Hulth, 71, Swedish astroparticle physicist.
- Meera Kosambi, 75, Indian sociologist.
- Earl Lloyd, 86, American basketball player (Syracuse Nationals, Detroit Pistons).
- Branislav Martinović, 77, Serbian Olympic wrestler (1960, 1964).
- Curt Michel, 80, American astrophysicist.
- Franklin Quitugua, 81, Guamanian politician.
- Rowley Richards, 98, Australian World War II Army medical officer.
- Martin T. Smith, 80, American politician, member of the Mississippi Senate (1968–1988).
- Fritz J. Raddatz, 83, German feuilletonist, essayist, biographer and novelist.
- Avijit Roy, 42, Bangladeshi-American writer, stabbed.
- Tom Schweich, 54, American politician, State Auditor of Missouri (since 2011), suicide by gunshot.
- Hukam Singh, 89, Indian politician, Chief Minister of Haryana (1990–1991).
- Carlos Talbott, 95, American air force lieutenant general.

=== 27 ===
- Richard Bakalyan, 84, American actor (Batman, Chinatown, The Fox and the Hound).
- Manfred Bayer, 86, German-born American microbiologist.
- Bob Benmosche, 70, American executive, President and CEO of American International Group (2009–2014), lung cancer.
- Malcolm Boyd, 91, American Episcopal priest, author, pneumonia.
- Mykhailo Chechetov, 61, Russian-born Ukrainian politician, member of Verkhovna Rada (1994–1998, 2006–2014), suicide by autodefenestration.
- Charles Cranfield, 99, British theologian and academic.
- Tod Dockstader, 82, American sound artist and electronic music composer.
- John Fairchild, 87, American publisher and editor (Women's Wear Daily).
- Tim Ford, 63, American politician, Speaker of the Mississippi House of Representatives (1988–2004), heart attack.
- Paul Hutchison, 47, Australian cricketer.
- Jerome Kurtz, 83, American public servant, Commissioner of Internal Revenue (1977–1983), complications of surgery.
- Sue Landske, 77, American politician, member of the Indiana Senate (1984–2014), cancer.
- Jonell Nash, 72, American food editor (Essence).
- Boris Nemtsov, 55, Russian politician, Governor of Nizhny Novgorod Oblast (1991–1997), First Deputy Prime Minister (1997–1998), Deputy Prime Minister (1998), shot.
- Leonard Nimoy, 83, American actor and director (Star Trek, Mission: Impossible, Fringe), emphysema.
- Natalia Revuelta Clews, 89, Cuban socialite.
- Julio César Strassera, 81, Argentine lawyer and jurist, chief prosecutor of the Trial of the Juntas.
- Anna Szatkowska, 86, Polish resistance fighter.
- Yevgeni Titov, 51, Russian footballer.
- Bohdan Tomaszewski, 93, Polish sports commentator.
- Oscar Touster, 93, American molecular biologist.
- Patrick Whitefield, 66, English permaculturist.
- Joanne Woollard, British film art director (Gravity, Hope and Glory, 101 Dalmatians).

=== 28 ===
- Tom Bettis, 81, American football player (Green Bay Packers) and coach.
- William J. Bichsel, 86, American Jesuit priest and peace protester.
- Clifford Edmund Bosworth, 86, British oriental historian.
- Braulio Castillo, 81, Puerto Rican actor.
- P. T. de Silva, 86, Sri Lankan consultant physician.
- Sarah Foot, 75, British journalist and author.
- Gordie Gillespie, 88, American baseball, football and basketball coach.
- Alex Johnson, 72, American baseball player (California Angels, Cincinnati Reds), prostate cancer.
- Yaşar Kemal, 91, Turkish author, Légion d'honneur recipient.
- John Komba, 60, Tanzanian politician.
- Ezra Laderman, 90, American composer.
- J. Michael Lenihan, 71, American politician, member of the Rhode Island Senate (1990–2010), cancer.
- Anthony Mason, 48, American basketball player (New York Knicks), heart failure.
- Maxee, 46, American singer, slit throat following fall.
- Ed Modzelewski, 86, American football player (Cleveland Browns), heart failure.
- Thakin Tin Mya, 91, Burmese politician.
- Thomas Owens, 76, Australian Olympic sailor.
- William Röttger, 66, German label manager, music manager and gallery owner, cancer.
- Thomas J. Stanley, 71, American author (The Millionaire Next Door, The Millionaire Mind), traffic collision.
- Tracker Tilmouth, 62, Australian aboriginal activist, cancer.
- André Vallée, 84, Canadian Roman Catholic prelate, Bishop of Military (1987–1996) and Hearst (1996–2005).
- Gigi Vesigna, 83, Italian journalist and writer.
- Orris George Walker, 72, American episcopal prelate, Bishop of Long Island (1991–2009).
