= Engracia =

Engracia or Engrácia may refer to:

== People ==
- Engrácia Cabenha (born 1949), Angolan rebel
- Engracia Cruz-Reyes (1892–1975), Filipino chef and entrepreneur
- Engracia Pastora Pérez Yépez (1910–2015), Venezuelan culinary artisan

== Other ==
- Abbey of Santa Engracia, Benedictine monastery in Zaragoza, Aragon, Spain, established no later than the 6th century
- Church of Santa Engrácia, 17th century monument of the city of Lisbon
- Church of Santa Engracia de Zaragoza, basilica church in Zaragoza, Spain
- Santa Engrácia (Lisbon), Portuguese parish (freguesia) in the municipality of Lisbon
- Santa Engracia del Jubera, village in the province and autonomous community of La Rioja, Spain
