= Ludorf (surname) =

Ludorf is a German language habitational surname denoting a person originally living in Ludorf (place name from a personal name with the element liut "people", "tribe" and Dorf "village") and may refer to:

- Henry F. Ludorf (1888–1968), American architect
- Julius Ludorf (1919–2015), German footballer
