= Walter May =

Walter May may refer to:

- Walter G. May, American engineer
- Walter Barton May, English industrialist
- Walt May, American football player
