= Wilhelm Baumann =

Wilhelm Baumann may refer to:

- Wilhelm Baumann (handballer)
- Wilhelm Baumann (politician)
