= Sare =

Sare may refer to:

== People ==
- Bakary Saré (born 1990), Burkinabé football player
- Clyde W. Sare (1936–2015), American politician and businessman
- Haig Sare (born 1982), Australian rugby union player
- Hamit Şare (born 1982), Turkish alpine skier
- Karl Säre (1903–1945), Estonian communist politician
- N'Diklam Sare (ruled c.1390–c.1420), Jolof ruler
- Resul Sare (born 1970), Turkish alpine skier
- Sare N'Dyaye (ruled c.1370–c.1390), Jolof ruler

== Places ==
- Säre, village in Estonia
- Šare, village in Serbia
- Sare, Pyrénées-Atlantiques, France

== Other ==
- Sare language, also known as Kapriman language
- SARE, Sustainable Agriculture Research and Education
- SARE, the ICAO code for Resistencia International Airport, Argentina
