= Shaida Mohammad Abdali =

Former Afghan ambassador to India

Shaida Mohammad Abdali شیدا محمد ابدالی
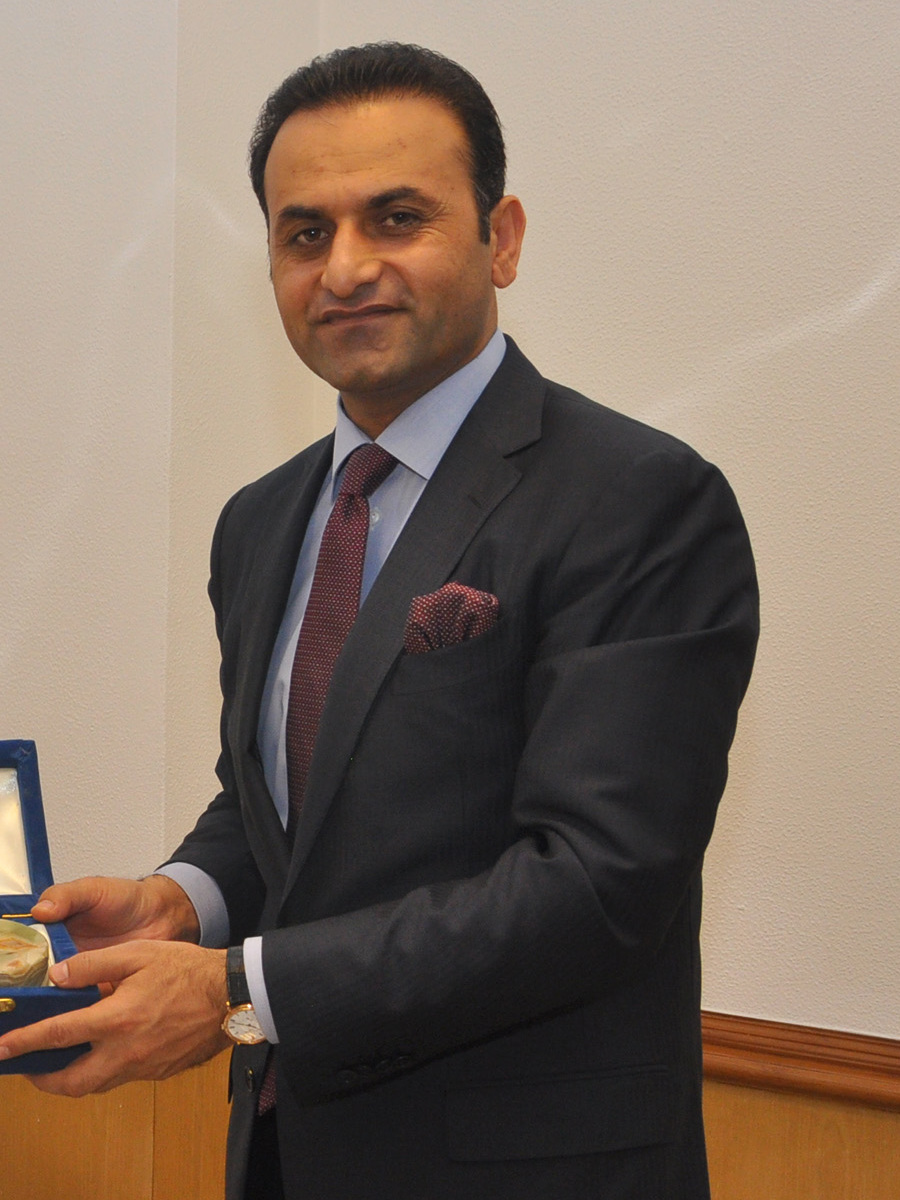

Afghan Ambassador to Japan
- In office 27 May 2021 – 31 January 2026
- President: Ashraf Ghani
- Preceded by: Bashir Mohabbat
- Succeeded by: Office abolished

Afghan Ambassador to India
- In office 20 July 2012 – 19 September 2018
- President: Hamid Karzai
- Preceded by: Nanguyalai Tarzi
- Succeeded by: Tahir Qadiry (acting)

National Security Advisor
- President: Hamid Karzai

Personal details
- Born: 8 November 1978 (age 47) Kandahar, Afghanistan
- Children: 4
- Education: National Defense University; Jawaharlal Nehru University

Shaida Mohammad Abdali (Pashto: شیدا محمد ابدالی, born on 8 November 1978 in Kandahar) was the Afghan Ambassador to Japan from 2021 to 2026. He was formerly the Afghan Ambassador to India from 2012 to 2018.

== Early life and education ==
Abdali was born on 8 November 1978 in Kandahar.

He has M.A. in Strategic Security Studies from the National Defense University, and a PhD from the Jawaharlal Nehru University.

== Career ==
Abdali was the Afghan Ambassador to India resident in New Delhi, and also the non-resident Ambassador to Bhutan, Maldives and Nepal. He was subsequently nominated by President Hamid Karzai to serve as the Deputy National Security Advisor and Special Assistant to then President of Afghanistan. Ambassador Abdali provided the President with policy and oversight advice on national security issues, and was as such active in Afghan politics.

In January 2021, Abdali was appointed as the Afghan Ambassador to Japan. He had been the Ambassador-designate in Tokyo without presenting his letter of credence for around four months because of the COVID-19 outbreak in Japan, especially the Japanese government has placed its capital, which includes the Imperial Palace, under a state of emergency due to COVID-19 on April 25. Abdali eventually presented his letter of credence to Emperor Naruhito at the Imperial Palace on May 27.

Despite the Fall of Kabul to the Taliban in August 2021, Tokyo hosts Abdali as the Ambassador Extraordinary and Plenipotentiary of Afghanistan until 31 January 2026 when the Japanese government with consultation of remaining Afghan diplomats decided to close Afghan Embassy indefinitely.

== Personal life ==
He is married and has four children.

== Works published ==
- Afghanistan Pakistan India: A Paradigm Shift (July 2016), Pentagon Press, ISBN 978-8182749030
