= Südmüritz =

- Municipality
- Location of Südmüritz within Mecklenburgische Seenplatte district
- Interactive map of Südmüritz
- Location within Germany Location within Mecklenburg-Vorpommern
- Coordinates: 53°21′N 12°41′E
- Country: Germany
- State: Mecklenburg-Vorpommern
- District: Mecklenburgische Seenplatte
- Municipal assoc.: Röbel-Müritz

Area
  - Total: 68.61 km^{2} (26.49 sq mi)
- Elevation: 65 m (213 ft)

Population (2025-12-31)
  - Total: 792
  - Density: 11.5/km^{2} (29.9/sq mi)
- Time zone: UTC+01:00 (CET)
  - Summer (DST): UTC+02:00 (CEST)
- Postal codes: 17207, 17209
- Dialling codes: 039923, 039931
- Vehicle registration: MÜR
- Website: www.amt-roebel-mueritz.de

Südmüritz (German pronunciation: [ˈzyːtˌmyːʁɪts], lit. 'South Müritz') is a municipality in the Mecklenburgische Seenplatte district, in Mecklenburg-Vorpommern, Germany. It was created with effect from 26 May 2019 by the merger of the former municipalities of Ludorf and Vipperow. Its name refers to its location on the south side of the lake Müritz.
