= Vipperow =

- Ortsteil of Südmüritz
- Interactive map of Vipperow
- Location within Germany Location within Mecklenburg-Vorpommern
- Coordinates: 53°19′47″N 12°41′12″E
- Country: Germany
- State: Mecklenburg-Vorpommern
- District: Mecklenburgische Seenplatte
- Municipality: Südmüritz

Area
  - Total: 20.24 km^{2} (7.81 sq mi)
- Elevation: 63 m (207 ft)

Population (2017-12-31)
  - Total: 411
  - Density: 20.3/km^{2} (52.6/sq mi)
- Time zone: UTC+01:00 (CET)
  - Summer (DST): UTC+02:00 (CEST)
- Postal codes: 17207
- Dialling codes: 039923
- Vehicle registration: MÜR
- Website: www.amt-roebel- mueritz.de

Vipperow (German pronunciation: [ˈfɪpəʁoː]) is a village and a former municipality in the Mecklenburgische Seenplatte district, in Mecklenburg-Vorpommern, Germany. Since May 2019, it is part of the new municipality Südmüritz.
