= James H. Schwartz (politician) =

American politician

Member of the Iowa House of Representatives
- In office 1969–1973

Personal details
- Born: January 29, 1928 Ottumwa, Iowa, U.S.
- Died: February 14, 2015 (aged 87) Des Moines, Iowa, U.S.
- Party: Democratic
- Spouse: Patricia Colbert (m. 1949; died 1996)
- Children: 7
- Parents: Al "Babe" Schwartz (father); Catherine Cosgrove (mother)
- Occupation: insurance

James Henry Schwartz (January 29, 1928 – February 14, 2015) was an American politician in the state of Iowa.

Schwartz was born in Ottumwa, Iowa, the son of Al “Babe” and Catherine Cosgrove Schwartz, and married Patricia Colbert on April 23, 1949, in Melcher, Iowa. He attended Creighton University and worked for the Schwartz Insurance Agency for 66 years. He served in the Iowa House of Representatives from 1969 to 1973 as a Democrat. He and his family purchased Hotel Ottumwa in 1982, and at the time of his death on February 14, 2015, at Mercy Medical Center in Des Moines, Iowa, his family continued to operate the hotel.
