= Abdul Hamid Mohtat =

Afghan politician and military officer (born 12 October 1944)

- عبد الحمید محتاط

Vice President of Afghanistan
- In office May 1988 – April 1992
- President: Mohammed Najibullah

Minister of Communications
- In office 2 August 1973 – April 1974
- President: Mohammed Daoud Khan

Ambassador of Afghanistan to Japan
- In office June 1978 – Unknown

Personal details
- Born: 1944 (age 81–82) Parwan Province, Afghanistan
- Party: People's Democratic Party of Afghanistan (until 1990); Watan Party (from 1990)
- Occupation: Politician, Military Officer

Abdul Hamid Mohtat (born 12 October 1944) is an Afghan former politician and military officer who served as Vice President and Deputy Prime Minister.

Mohtat was born in 1944 in Parwan province. He graduated from a military school in 1964 and was then got trained in Soviet Union as an engineer. He also served as Minister of Communications in 1973 but was dismissed in April 1974 by Mohammed Daoud Khan. In June 1978, he became ambassador of Afghanistan to Japan.

He was one of the Vice Presidents in Najibullah cabinet from May 1988 to April 1992. He was also Deputy Prime Minister at that time.

== Personal life ==
Mohtat has a son and daughter. His children returned to Afghanistan from the United States along with members of the KPF and were given immunity by Mawlawi Zakir, a Taliban official.
