= Khost Protection Force =

Afghan paramilitary group

- Active: 2002-2021
- Country: Islamic Republic of Afghanistan
- Allegiance: Khalq
- Type: Paramilitary
- Role: Counterinsurgency; Special operations
- Size: 3,500 to 10,000 soldiers
- Mascot: Tiger
- Engagements: War in Afghanistan

The Khost Protection Force (KPF), formally known as the 25th Division by the (Afghan) Ministry of Defence was an Afghan paramilitary. It was the oldest of a number of CIA-backed paramilitaries formed following the United States invasion of Afghanistan, in collaboration with the National Directorate of Security (NDS), being under its command.

Initially largely made up of former People's Democratic Party members, the KPF was based at Camp Chapman in Khost Province and it also had battalions in Gardez and Sharana, operating in the region bordering Pakistan's North Waziristan District.

The KPF has been accused of war crimes including torture and killing civilians.

== History ==
After the fall of the Taliban in 2001, the presence of US forces in the province of Khost led to significant changes in the power dynamics of the region. As military units operated in the area, they sought alliances with like-minded individuals who shared their immediate goals. In a peculiar turn of events, the power vacuum created by the Taliban's defeat allowed former communists, who were once adversaries of the United States during the 1980s, to rise to power. These individuals, being staunchly anti-Taliban, became valuable allies to the US and Coalition partners in the region. This unexpected shift in power dynamics set the stage for the establishment of the Khost Protection Force (KPF), a paramilitary group that would play a significant role in the security landscape of Khost province. When it was first established, it was first led by Gaffar Khan.

In 2002, General Khailbaz, an exiled Khalq officer from Jaji Maidan, returned to Khost and established his own militia comprising former communist soldiers. It was integrated into what became known as the Khost Protection Force (KPF). But the unit faced criticism from other tribes for their perceived lack of accountability, arrogance upon returning to Khost City, harassment of former mujahedeen members, and allegations of ruthlessness and human rights abuses. Observers noted that while nominally subordinate to the National Directorate of Security (NDS), the KPF operated autonomously from the Kabul government. In 2019, the United Nations reported that the organization operated outside of the legal government structure, and the widespread impunity enjoyed by its members remained a grave concern. The KPF received funding from the Central Intelligence Agency until the Fall of Kabul in August 2021.

Like other paramilitaries in Afghanistan during the 2001-2021 war, the KPF was mostly trained and recruited by the CIA despite nominally under NDS command; it did not come under the command chain of the Afghan National Army or the U.S. Army.

In November 2015, a growing number of deadly night raids by the KPF caused a backlash by the residents in the city of Khost against the United States.

Following the fall of Kabul, the Taliban intensified their hunt to find and kill members of the KPF in October 2021. The KPF disobeyed orders given to abandon their gear and vehicles and simply destroyed anything that they couldn't take with them.

In January 2022, it was reported that surviving KPF soldiers arrived in the US and were living in Bloomington; most of them were forced to leave their immediate families behind. They came through the "Welcome Home Project".

In May of 2024, it was reported that over seventy members had been detained by the General Directorate of Intelligence (GDI) upon their return from training in the United States in 2022.

In July of 2024, it was reported that an additional six members had returned to Afghanistan after being invited by the Afghanistan Personalities Contact Commission. The children of Abdul Hamid Mohtat and members of the KPF received "immunity cards".

In October of 2024, it was reported that the KPF base was being used by the Haqqani Network to train two thousand foreign jihadists. The base is frequently visited by Sirajuddin Haqqani.

On July 20, 2026, an ex-KPF soldier who came back to Afghanistan from the US was shot at Nangyalai, according to Taliban statements while denying that it had political motives.

== Role ==
An American official speaking anonymously told The Washington Post in 2015 that the KPF “is one of the most effective elements fighting the Taliban in Afghanistan, and were it not for their constant efforts, Khost would likely be a Haqqani-held province, and Kabul would be under far greater threat than it is,”. KPF soldiers provide assistance by tracking targets for drone strikes.

Afghan soldiers and law enforcers do cooperate with the KPF in anti-Taliban operations for fear of getting into trouble with their superiors.

The KPF operated with a country-wide informant network.
