= Jaime Vásquez (Chilean footballer) =

Chilean footballer (1929-2015)

Jaime Enrique Vásquez Becker
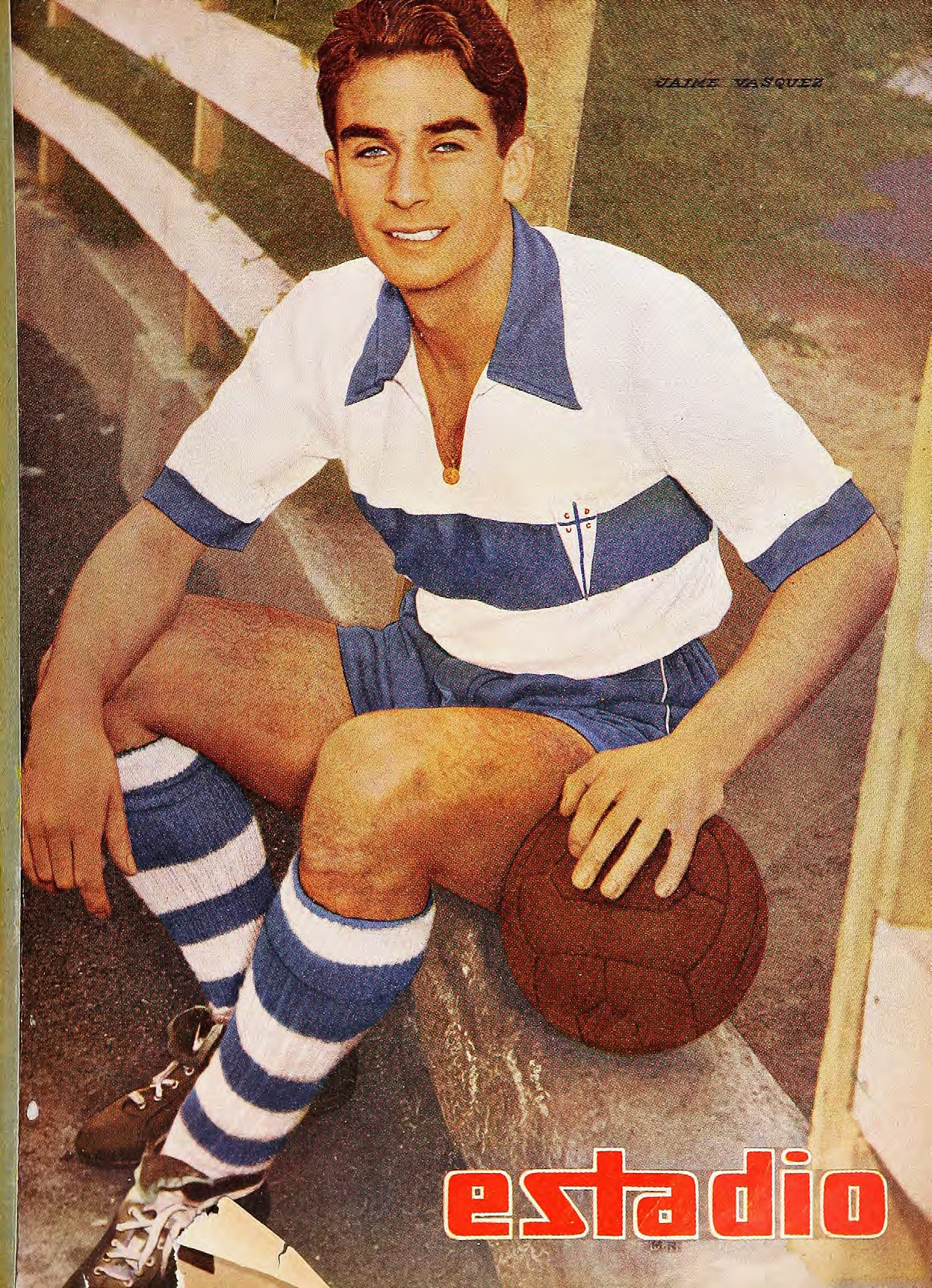
- 1954

Personal information
- Date of birth: 22 August 1929
- Place of birth: Santiago, Chile
- Date of death: 23 February 2015 (aged 85)

International career
Years	Team	Apps	(Gls)
- Chile

Jaime Vásquez (22 August 1929 – 23 February 2015) was a Chilean footballer. He competed in the men's tournament at the 1952 Summer Olympics.
