= Johnny Campbell (footballer, born 1928) =

English footballer

Personal information
- Full name: John Campbell
- Date of birth: 23 July 1928
- Place of birth: Byermoor, County Durham
- Date of death: 6 February 2015 (aged 86)
- Place of death: Gateshead, Tyne and Wear

Youth career
- Newcastle United
- Felling Red Star

Senior career*
Years	Team	Apps	(Gls)
1949–1956	Gateshead	181	(45)
- Consett
- * Club domestic league appearances and goals

Johnny Campbell (23 July 1928 – 6 February 2015) was an English footballer who played as a winger.

Campbell played league football for Gateshead between 1949 and 1956, scoring 45 goals in 181 league appearances before moving to non-league Consett in 1956.

In 1946 he signed as an amateur for Newcastle United however his career was interrupted due to National Service in the RAF. Following this, he played amateur football for Felling Red Star in Gateshead. In November 1949 he left his employment as a mechanic and joined Gateshead AFC of the Third Division North as a professional player.

He played in Gateshead's famous FA Cup run of 1953 where they reached the 6th round—Liverpool (h) 1–0, Hull City (a) 2–1, and Plymouth (a) 1–0—before falling to a solitary goal by Bolton's Nat Lofthouse, the Lion of Vienna, in the sixth round at Redheugh Park before a crowd of 17,692.

== Sources ==
- "Post War English & Scottish Football League A–Z Player's Transfer Database".
