= Carl Cunningham-Cole =

British ceramic artist (1942–2015)

- Born: 1942
- Died: 2015 (aged 72–73)
- Resting place: Algutsboda, Sweden
- Known for: Torbay Academy of Art, Newton Abbot College
- Notable work: Ceramic art, sculpture, porcelain, earthenware, stoneware, painting

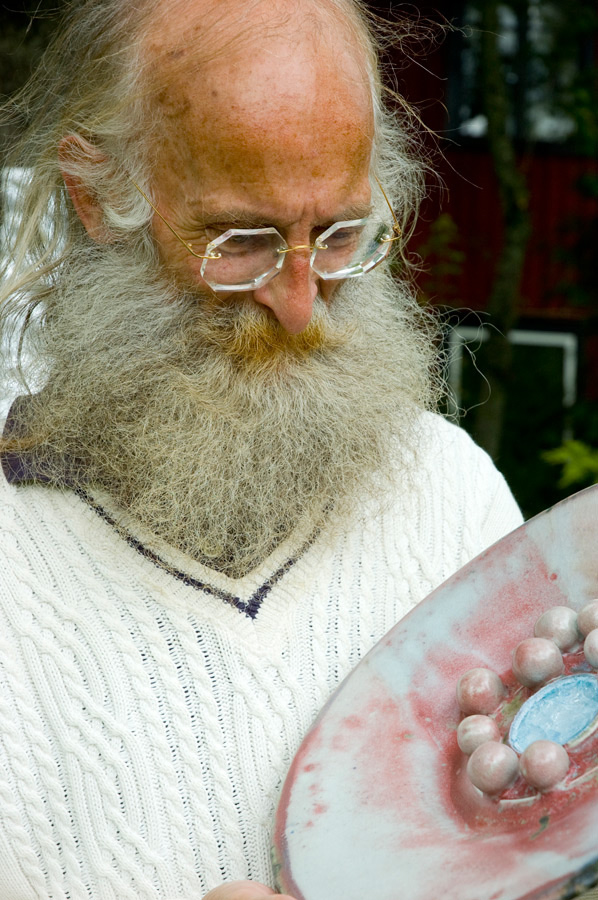
British Ceramic artist Carl Cunningham-Cole after a successful firing of a peach coloured Sung period glaze - May 2010

Carl Cunningham-Cole (1942 – February 2015) was a British ceramic artist, resident in Sweden.

Born in Farnham Surrey, Carl Cunningham-Cole was accepted at the age of fifteen to Newton Abbot College. At the age of seventeen he had already exhibited together with sculptor Lynn Chadwick.

After travelling throughout Europe, Carl spent three years visiting countries like Turkey, Syria, Iraq, Kuwait, Afghanistan, Pakistan, India, Nepal in order to widen his perception of the ancient art form. Following the Silk Route and visiting China, Japan (at Kyoto-based Kawai Kanjiro Studios) and Korea, which he claimed as one of the most important regions in ceramic history, much due to its exquisite celadon glazes.

After apprenticeship and dialogues with Bernard Leach, Hans Coper, Lucy Rie, Liu Shengdao (with whom he participated on national Chinese TV), Dong O Anh and Hamada Shoji, Carl developed techniques which would make him notable among the masters of the ceramic arts.

After some years in Denmark, he settled in the village of Algutsboda in southern Sweden, where he lived and worked for over forty years.

After decades of attempts and studies, in the beginning of the 2000s he achieved several sequential firings, producing a peach-coloured very rare glaze exclusively connected with the Chinese Sung Period (960-1279).

His work is discussed in the 2001 documentary ‘MasterPiece - The Art of Carl Cunningham-Cole” by Swedish filmmaker Johan Robach.

Although living in Sweden for most of his life, he remained a British citizen.

He died in his home in Algutsboda in February 2015.

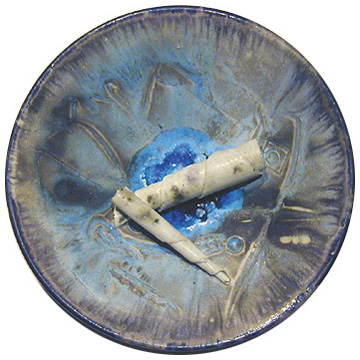
Dead Sea Scrolls (2000)

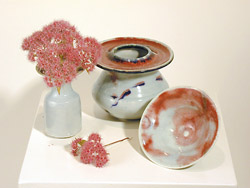
Jingdezhens (2001)
