= Dust La Rock =

American artist

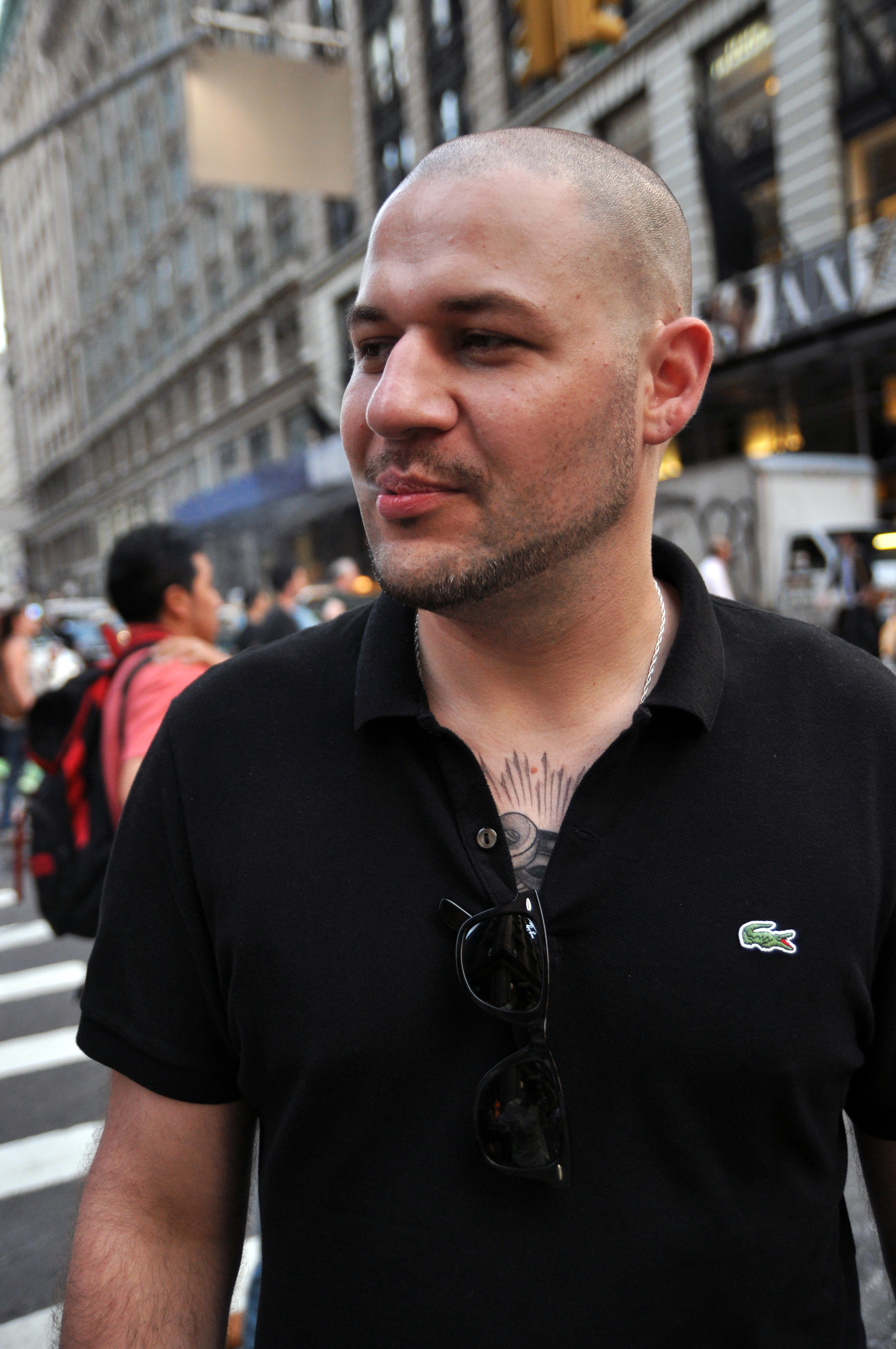
- Dust La Rock in SoHo after his Kid Robot toy signing on July 1, 2009
- Born: Joshua Prince; December 9, 1976
- Died: February 1, 2015 (aged 38)
- Known for: Illustration, Graphic design

Joshua Prince (December 9, 1976 – February 1, 2015) in Newport Beach, California), professionally known as Dust La Rock, was a New York-based artist and designer.

== Biography ==
From 2007 to 2012, Prince was the co-founder, art director, chief designer for Fool's Gold Records, working with artists A-Trak, Action Bronson, Danny Brown and Duck Sauce. His work often featured cartoonish illustrations, which defined the look of indie dance and hip-hop artists.

Before his death, he lived and worked in Los Angeles, California. Prince died on February 1, 2015.
