= Léon Close =

Belgian footballer

Personal information
- Date of birth: 20 August 1931
- Date of death: 24 February 2015 (aged 83)
- Position: Defender

International career
Years	Team	Apps	(Gls)
1957–1958	Belgium	2	(0)

Léon Close (20 August 1931 – 24 February 2015) was a Belgian footballer. He played in two matches for the Belgium national football team from 1957 to 1958.
