= List of ambassadors of Afghanistan to Japan =

Within the context of diplomatic relations between Afghanistan and Japan, Afghanistan has appointed an envoy to Japan intermittently since 1933, under the title of either ambassador or chargé d'affaires. There has been no accredited representative since 2026.

Date of Presentation of Credentials	Post	Name
October 19, 1933	Ambassador	Habibullah Khan Tarzi
May 1939	Chargé d'affaires	Abdul Rauf Khan (diplomat)
July 12, 1939	Ambassador	Zul Facar Khan
August 1945		The Afghan Embassy was closed.
May 23, 1956		Embassy resumed normal functions.
May 31, 1956	Ambassador	Abdul Majid Khan
July 3, 1963	Chargé d'affaires	Eid M. Mohabbat
March 17, 1965	Ambassador	Abdul Rahim
Apr 13, 1967	Chargé d'affaires	Abdul Aziz Ali
May 22, 1967	Ambassador	Abdul Hakim Tabibi
August 28, 1970	Chargé d'affaires	Abdul Ahad Mahmoud
September 22, 1970	Ambassador	Said Kassim Rishtya
September 27, 1973	Chargé d'affaires	Mohamad Sarwar Damani
October 24, 1974	Ambassador	Ali Ahmad Popal
November 11, 1976	Chargé d'affaires	Sa’adullah Ghausy
June 10, 1977	Ambassador	Mohammad Hasan Sharq
May 12, 1978	Chargé d'affaires	Sa’adullah Ghausy
July 10, 1978	Ambassador	Abdul Hamid Mohtat
April 28, 1978		Coup d'état: Japanese government lowered the status of its relations with the new Communist regime
September 8, 1987	Chargé d'affaires	Shir Rahman
November 17, 1987	Chargé d'affaires	Mahammad Naim
November 17, 1987	Chargé d'affaires	Mohammad Rahim Robin
March 21, 1990	Chargé d'affaires	Mohammad Rahim Robin
August 30, 1992	Chargé d'affaires	Mohammad Asif Hassani
May 27, 1993	Chargé d'affaires	Mohamoud Saikal
April 7, 1994	Chargé d'affaires	Doulat Khan Ahmadzai
April 30, 1994	Chargé d'affaires	Amir M. Mohabbat
July 24, 1996	Chargé d'affaires	Rahmatullah Amir
November 1997		The Embassy activities were suspended.
November 27, 2002	Chargé d'affaires	Mohammad Noor Akbary
April 30, 2004	Ambassador	Haron Amin
June 19, 2009	Ambassador	Eklil Ahmad Hakimi
December 27, 2010	Ambassador	Mohammad Amin Fatemi
July 19, 2017	Ambassador	Bashir Mohabbat
May 27, 2021	Ambassador	Shaida Mohammad Abdali. He continued to serve as ambassador for several years after the Taliban took over Afghanistan in August 2021, eventually leaving his post on 31 January 2026, when the Embassy of Afghanistan, Tokyo closed.
