= Herbert P. McLaughlin =

American architect (1934–2015)

Herbert P. McLaughlin Jr. (June 15, 1934 – February 25, 2015) was an American architect. He was a pioneer of the concept of adaptive reuse to preserve historic architecture, saving buildings from demolition by repurposing them. Examples include Chicago's historic Dearborn Station and the Omaha National Bank Building, the Mobil Building in Dallas, and the Hallidie Building and Design Center in San Francisco. In the 1970s and 1980s, when McLaughlin was most active, he was one of the largest renovation developers in the US.

McLaughlin and his firm KMD Architects designed new buildings such as: the FEMA Headquarters; the Oakland Federal Building; FBI's Dallas Field Office; General Motors Technical Center; Sun Microsystems Campus; Brigham and Women's Hospital; Duke University Children's Health Center; Two Rodeo Drive (Beverly Hills); Detroit Lions' Stadium; The Wilshire (Los Angeles); Mercy Senior Housing and Mercy Family Housing (San Francisco); and the Stanford National Accelerator Laboratory.

== Biography ==
Born June 14, 1934, McLaughlin was educated at Yale University, receiving a B.A. in 1956, and a M.Arch in 1958. After graduation, he served as a Lieutenant in the United States Air Force, and married Eve Pell in 1959, a cousin of Claiborne Pell (the Rhode Island Senator who established the Pell Grants providing financial aid for college students), a debutante, and the author of We Used to Own the Bronx and Love Again. They had 3 sons: Daniel, Peter and John, and divorced in 1970. McLaughlin married (2nd) Susan Marie Hartman in 1987. They had 2 daughters: Grace Corinne and Gwendolyn Amy.

In 1963, McLaughlin co-founded the firm KMD (Kaplan McLaughlin Diaz), with architect Ellis Kaplan, joined in 1970 by the architect Jim Diaz. According to KMD's website: "Under Herb's direction, KMD won over 200 design awards, including 40 from AIA chapters and affiliates. Awards include: the Urban Landscape - Toshi Keikan Prize for Achievement for Nadya Park (International Design Center, Nagoya, Japan); the Chicago Athenaeum award for Kookmin Bank Headquarters in Seoul; and five awards by the AIA Committee on Architecture including two with special Citations. The firm has also been recognized for its success in international design competitions".

In 1987, McLaughlin established the Brendan Gill Lectureship Fund at his alma mater, Yale University (B.A. 1956, M.Arch. 1958) to honor his friend, the writer and critic Brendan Gill (B.A. 1936). He also established architecture scholarships at UC Berkeley and Technion (Israel Institute of Technology).

== Publications ==
- Planning, Programming and Design for the Community Mental Health Center (the Community Health Center, Volume 1); Joseph J. Downing, Robert A. Kimmich, Ellis Kaplan, Herbert McLaughlin, 1966, National Institute for Mental Health
- The Disquieting Roles that Architecture Plays in the Movies, Journal of the American Institute of Architects, vol.63, Jan.1975, pp. 39–41
- Good Eats, a Design and Food Guide to Bay Area Restaurants: Bars Delis Bakeries Ice Creameries Wines Wineries Cravings, Hdl Pub. Co., June 1987, ISBN 978-0897161633
- Tall Buildings, Tight Streets; A Research Project, Kaplan, McLaughlin, Diaz, 1984
