= Barbara Barletta =

American archaeologist and architectural historian (1952–2015)

Barbara A. Barletta (August 6, 1952 – February 1, 2015) was a prominent American Classical archaeologist and architectural historian.

== Early life ==
Barletta was born in 1952 in Carmel, California.

== Career ==
Barletta earned a B.A. in Art History at the University of California Santa Barbara and M.A. and Ph.D. degrees in Classical and Near Eastern Archaeology at Bryn Mawr College. From the American Academy in Rome Barletta received the Andrew W. Mellon Fellowship in Classical Studies in 1990. She received a series of awards from the National Endowment for the Humanities, including an award to support research on the Temple of Athena at Suonion in 2009.

Barletta's scholarship, in particular, focused on the history of the Greek architectural orders. Scholarly reviews of her work on the origin of the Greek orders praised her scholarship for making unique and important contributions. This scholarship considered regionalism and its influence in the emergence of the canonical Greek architectural orders.

== Death ==
Barletta died in 2015 in Gainesville, Florida.

== Publications ==
- 1981. Ionic component in the monumental art of archaic Sicily Ph.D. dissertation, Bryn Mawr College.
- 1983. Ionic influence in Archaic Sicily : the monumental art. Gothenburg: P. Åström Forlag.
- 1990. "An "Ionian Sea" Style in Archaic Doric Architecture." American Journal of Archaeology 94.1:45-72.
- 1993. “Some Ionic Architectural Elements from Selinus in the Getty." In Studia Varia from the J. Paul Getty Museum: Volume 1.
- 1997. "The Draped Kouros Type and the Workshop of the Syracuse Youth." American Journal of Archaeology 91.2:233-246.
- 1996. “The Campanian Tradition in Archaic Architecture,” Memoirs of the American Academy in Rome 41:1-67.
- 2001. The origins of the Greek architectural orders. Cambridge: Cambridge University Press.
- 2003. Review of L' Architecture grecque. Vol. 1, Les principes de la construction by M.-C. Hellman, American Journal of Archaeology 107.2:309-310.
- 2009. "In Defense of the Ionic Frieze of the Parthenon." American Journal of Archaeology 113.4:547-568.
- 2010. Review of Symbols of Wealth and Power: Architectural Terracotta Decoration in Etruria and Central Italy, 640–510 B.C. by Nancy Winter, American Journal of Archaeology 114.3.
- 2011. "Greek Architecture." American Journal of Archaeology 115.4:611-640.
- 2012. Review of Lydian Architecture: Ashlar Masonry Structures at Sardis By Christopher Ratté, American Journal of Archaeology 116.4
- Barbara A. Barletta; William B. Dinsmoor; Homer A. Thompson. 2014. The Sanctuary of Athena at Sounion. Princeton NJ: The American School of Classical Studies at Athens.

== Death ==
- Gainesville Sun February 9, 2015
