= Jonell Nash =

American food writer and magazine editor

- Born: 20 December 1942
- Died: 27 February 2015 (aged 72)
- Occupation: Editor
- Employer: Essence (1984–2008)

Jonell Nash (December 20, 1942 – February 27, 2015) was a food editor for Essence from 1984 to 2008 and author of the cookbook Low-Fat Soul, published in 1996.

== Early life ==
Born in Delhi, Louisiana, Nash was one of four children born to Willie Henry Nash Sr. and Mollie Osborne. Her siblings are Gertrude Cherry, Marva Stanton, and Willie Nash. Nash's father, Willie Henry Nash Sr., worked in a plastics plant. Her mother, Mollie Osborne, worked in a dry cleaning store. Her family moved from Louisiana to Detroit, Michigan.

== Career ==
Jonell Nash graduated from Wayne State University and started teaching high school home economics. Nash left her home economics job to go work for Scholastic's Coed magazine. She would then move to New York City, where she worked in a test kitchen at Woman's Day. She joined Essence Magazine as their Food Editor in 1984 until her retirement in 2008.

Nash is the author of two books. Her first book, Essence Brings You Great Cooking, was published in 1994 and had over 300 recipes from the magazine. Her second book, Low-Fat Soul, was published in 1996 by One World.

Nash financed a scholarship for students to study Southern cooking in honor of chef Edna Lewis with the help of Les Dames d’Escoffier New York, an organization of women in the food and hospitality professions. The scholarship is supposedly being renamed for Nash.

A collection of cookbooks owned and referenced by Nash is a part of the Wayne State University Special Collections.

== Personal life ==
Jonell Nash's lifelong partner was actor Paul D. Butler. Butler died in 2010, five years prior to Nash's death on February 27, 2015.

== Works ==
- Essence Brings You Great Cooking (1994)
- Low-Fat Soul (1996)
