= Ludorf =

- Ortsteil of Südmüritz
- Interactive map of Ludorf
- Location within Germany Location within Mecklenburg-Vorpommern
- Coordinates: 53°22′59″N 12°40′00″E
- Country: Germany
- State: Mecklenburg-Vorpommern
- District: Mecklenburgische Seenplatte
- Municipality: Südmüritz

Area
  - Total: 48.37 km^{2} (18.68 sq mi)
- Elevation: 64 m (210 ft)

Population (2017-12-31)
  - Total: 481
  - Density: 9.94/km^{2} (25.8/sq mi)
- Time zone: UTC+01:00 (CET)
  - Summer (DST): UTC+02:00 (CEST)
- Postal codes: 17207
- Dialling codes: 039931
- Vehicle registration: MÜR
- Website: www.amt-roebel- mueritz.de

Ludorf (German pronunciation: [ˈluːdɔʁf]) is a village and a former municipality in the Mecklenburgische Seenplatte district, in Mecklenburg-Vorpommern, Germany. Since May 2019, it is part of the new municipality Südmüritz.

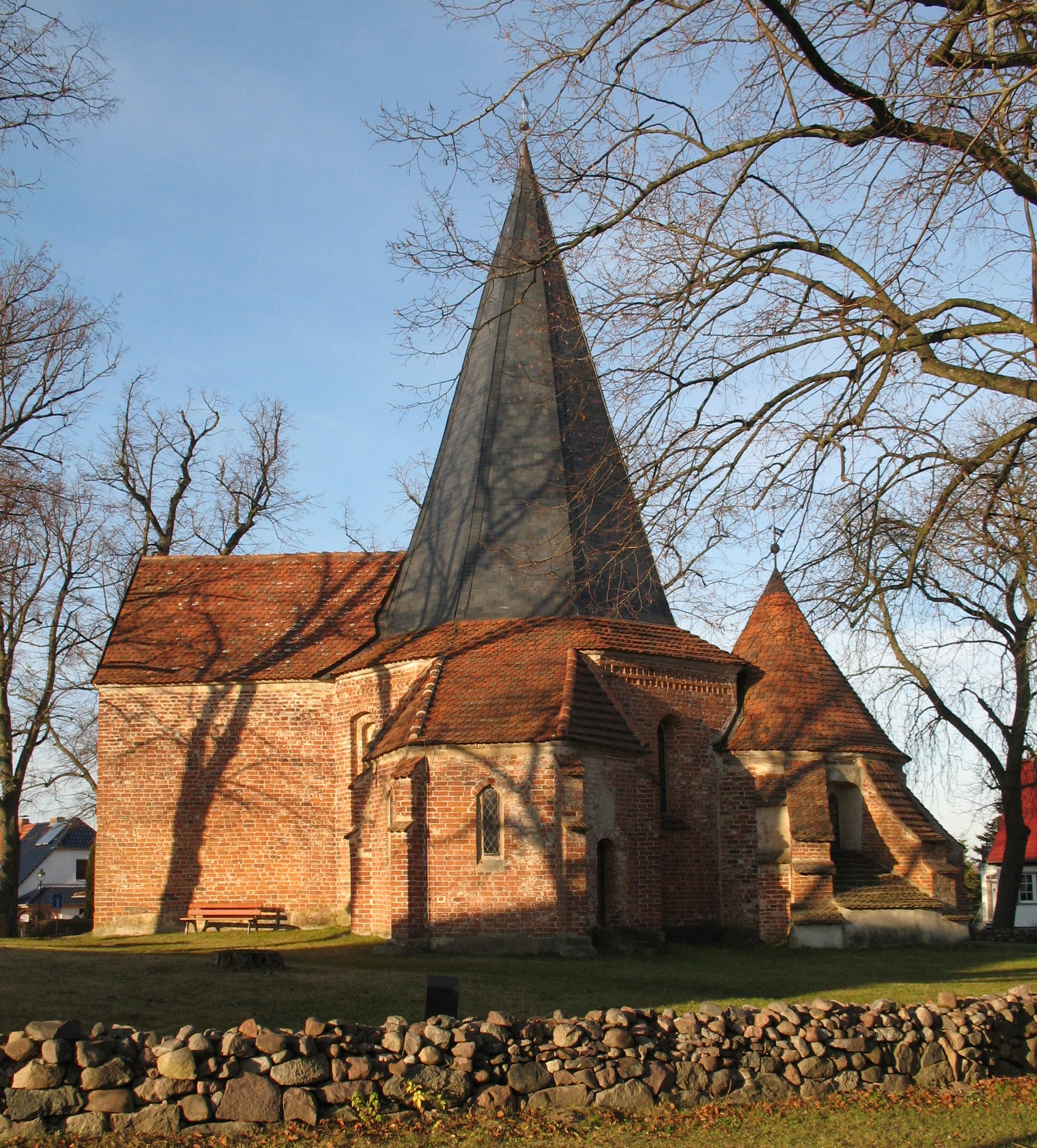
Church

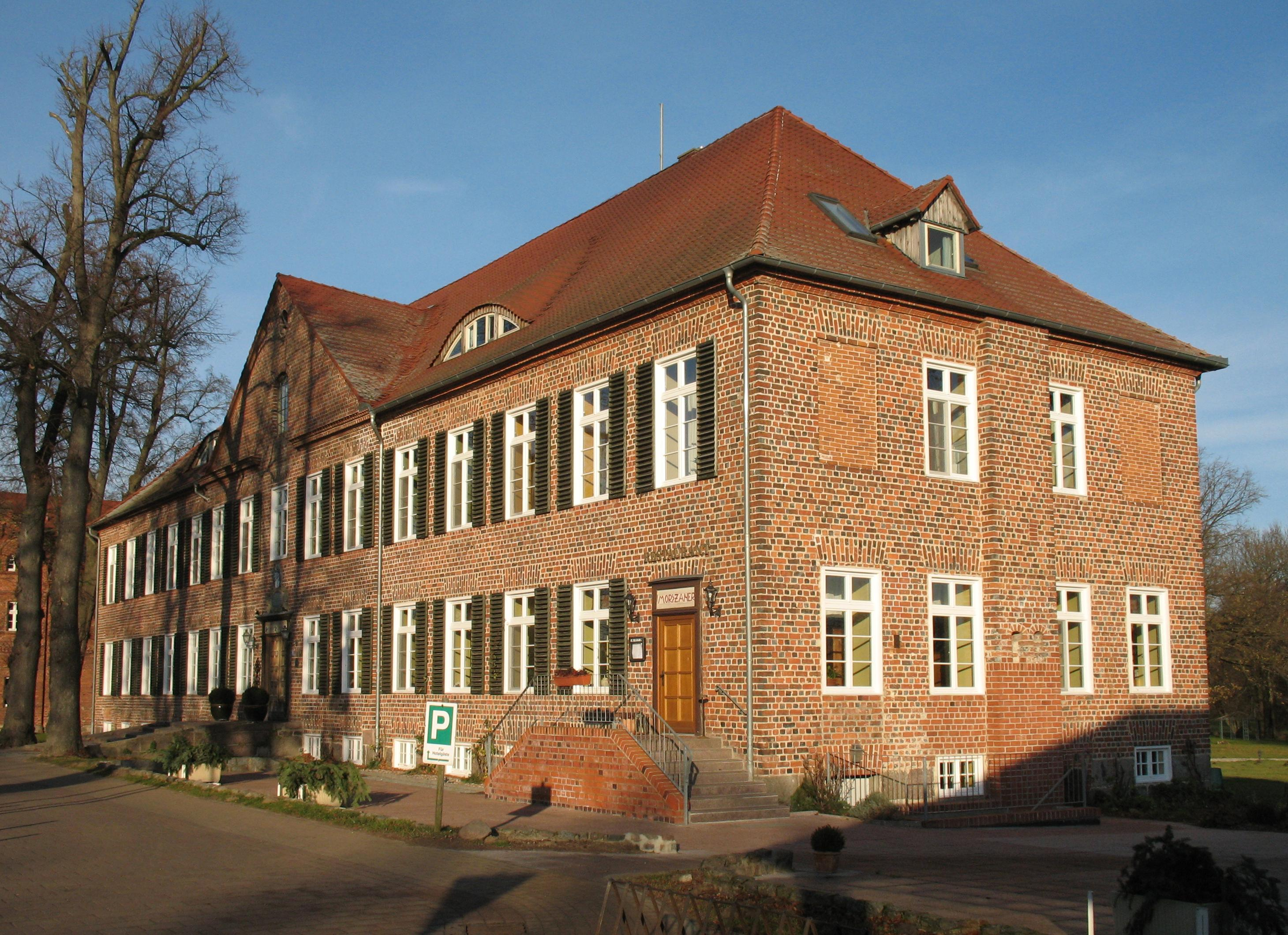
Manor
