= Clarence E. Singletary =

American politician

Clarence Edward Singletary (March 16, 1918 – February 25, 2015) was an American judge and politician.

Singletary was born in Pinopolis, South Carolina. In 1940, he graduated from the College of Charleston. Singletary served in the United States Coast Guard during World War II and was commissioned a lieutenant commander. In 1948, Singletary received his law degree from University of Michigan Law School. He practiced law in Charleston, South Carolina. In 1960 and 1961, Singletary served in the South Carolina House of Representatives. He then served as a South Carolina Circuit Court judge from 1961 to 1980. He lived in Moncks Corner, South Carolina when he died.
