= Brian Cumby =

Brian Cumby (9 October 1950 – 26 February 2015) was a British shipwright who built a full-size replica of a Bronze Age boat for the National Maritime Museum Cornwall in Falmouth using only the tools available to Bronze Age man.
