= Chuang Shu-chi =

Taiwanese physician (1920–2015)

Chuang Shu-chi (Chinese: 莊淑旂; pinyin: Zhuāng Shúqí; Pe̍h-ōe-jī: Chng Siok-kî; 26 November 1920 – 4 February 2015) was the first licensed female practitioner of traditional Chinese medicine in Taiwan.

== Early life and training ==
Born on 26 November 1920 in Taipei, Chuang Shu-chi was her parents' only biological child. During a later pregnancy, Chuang's mother fell, resulting in long-term infertility. The family later adopted two sons to carry on the father's practice in traditional Chinese medicine, Kuanghotang Pharmacy, which dated to the Qing dynasty. Chuang studied the field in secret, starting at the age of ten. When she was twelve, her father's assistant died. Chuang and her adoptive brothers worked through the night preparing the ingredients necessary for the next day. Subsequently, Chuang left school, and her father began training her in earnest. Chuang later said, "I was not a beauty, but many believed that if they took medicine prepared by an unmarried girl, their symptoms would alleviate quicker. People even came back to present me with red envelopes and gifts after they got better. The news of a doctor’s daughter who helped prepare medicine quickly spread." At the age of 14, Chuang cured her nephew of flu and pneumonia severe enough that the local pediatrician refused to treat him.

Chuang entered an arranged marriage with Chen You-le at the age of eighteen, to prevent the Japanese using her as a comfort woman. Her father died of colon cancer when Chuang was nineteen, and his clinic closed. In 1945, Chuang's husband died of lung cancer, leaving her to raise their children alone. She found a job washing clothes, and pursued study of traditional Chinese medicine when she could.

== Career following licensure ==
In 1950, a friend let her know that the government was holding licensure exams for traditional Chinese medicine practitioners. Chuang turned in her documentation late, but was permitted to take the test. She passed four of five sections with full marks, and failed the one covering the Constitution of the Republic of China. That section was replaced with an oral exam, and Chuang became one of two people to pass the test, alongside an examinee of Mainland Chinese descent. Upon receiving her license on 17 January 1951, Chuang became the first licensed female practitioner of traditional Chinese medicine in Taiwan. She reopened her father's clinic with the help of her brothers. Known as "Shorty Chi" throughout her childhood, Chuang became "Lady Doctor." When she opened the Chingcheng Radiology Clinic, it became the second medical facility in Taiwan capable of radiology, after National Taiwan University Hospital.

Chuang acquired a license to buy Angelica sinensis for the Taiwan Tobacco and Wine Monopoly Bureau. The arrangement defied the import limitations delineated within the National General Mobilization Law passed under martial law. She was arrested by military police and tried in a military court in 1953, before which she offered documents from the Taiwan Tobacco and Wine Monopoly Bureau as evidence. The military court sentenced Chuang to three years imprisonment. The ruling angered Chuang, causing an ulcer. She sought bail to undergo medical treatment for her condition, but a military court official frequently blackmailed her by threatening to enforce her sentence. One of Chuang's patients, the father-in-law of Chiang Wei-kuo, helped her secure authorization for treatment of her ulcer in Japan. She and her eldest daughter left Taiwan on 12 May 1954. Chuang closed Kuanghotang, which, under her stewardship, had been expanded to a medical clinic, and entrusted her mother with the care of her four other children.

== Later career in Japan and return to Taiwan ==
When she arrived in Japan, Chuang did not speak the language. Shortly thereafter, Chuang began working at Keio University as a researcher. With the support of Tu Tsung-ming, she was admitted as a postgraduate student. Between 1956 and 1961, Chuang studied cancer treatment and prevention at Keio University under Abe Katsuma and medical school dean Tadajiro Nishino. She authored a doctoral thesis titled Reducing the Suffering of Final Stage Cancer Patients. After completing her program of study, Chuang became the first woman from Taiwan to earn a doctorate from Keio University. Her first book, A Youth-Preserving Lifestyle and Diet, was published in Japanese. Chuang opened a medical clinic in Japan, and in 1978, it became known as The Association of International Families to Prevent Cancer. Widely known as the medical consultant for Crown Princess Michiko and the Imperial House of Japan, Chuang had split her time between Taiwan and Japan since completing her doctorate, and had become known in Taiwan for hosting a series of cancer awareness and prevention activities starting in 1967. Chuang returned permanently to Taiwan in 1988. In Taiwan, she chaired the Taipei-based Ching Fong Foundation of Social Welfare. In 1993, Chuang's book, The Ways of Sitting the Month, was published. The book was the first to link traditional Chinese practices of postpartum confinement with modern medicine. In 1994, Chuang established a Taiwan branch of her Japanese clinic, under the name International Family Cancer Prevention Foundation. Chuang continued her practice until 8 May 2009. After announcing her retirement, Chuang gathered with a group at the entrance of Taipei City Hall to perform her signature exercises. She died on 4 February 2015, in Longtan District, Taoyuan, after eating lunch at the home of her daughter-in-law.

== Legacy ==
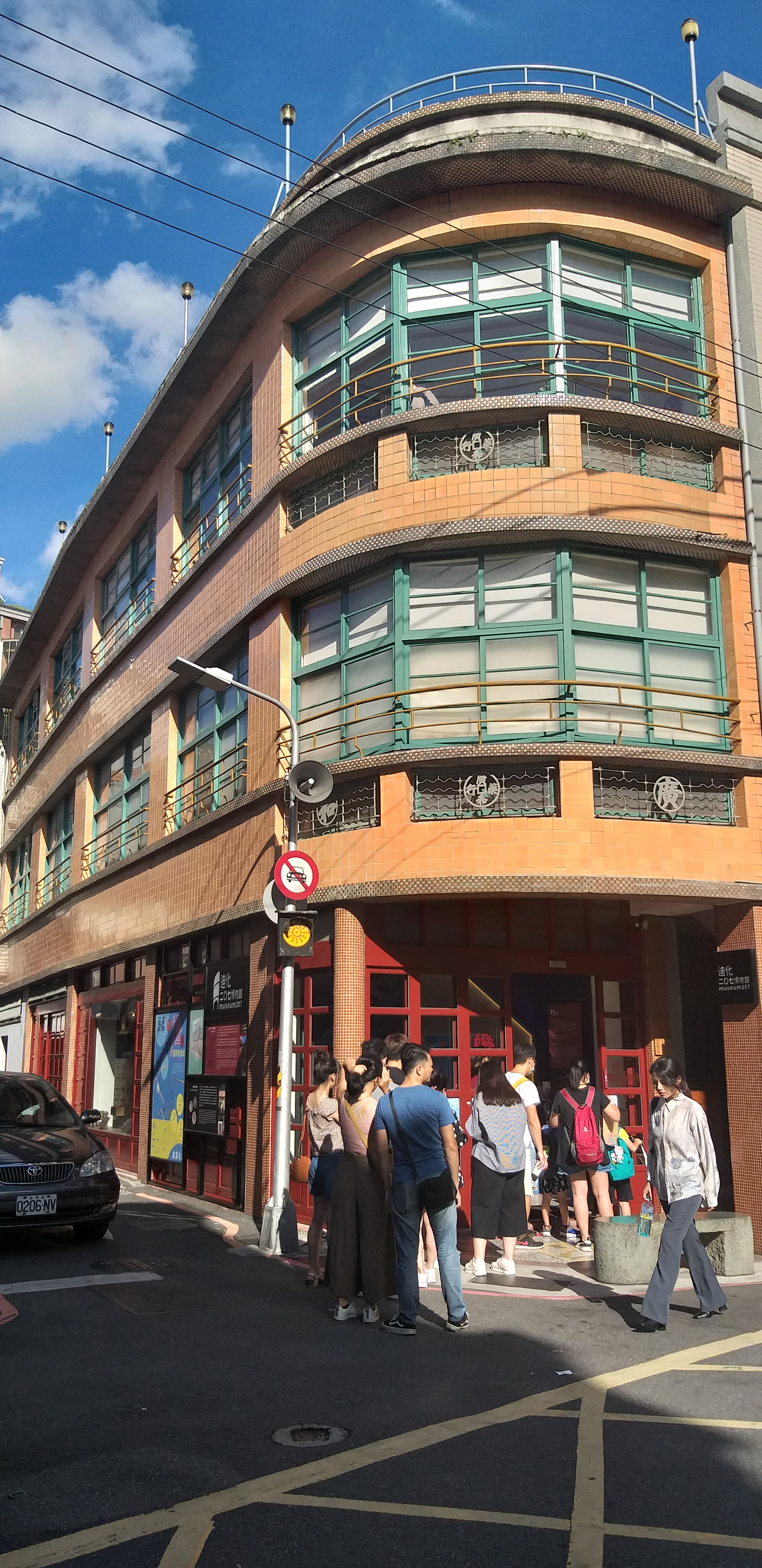
Entrance of Museum 207 in 2020

Chuang's former residence and practice on Dihua Street in Dadaocheng was named a cultural heritage site by the Taipei City Government in 2009, and converted into Museum 207 in April 2017. In 2019, under the leadership of founding executive director Chen Kok-choo, Museum 207 became one of the first private museums to be certified within the purview of the Museum Act.
