= Dzhangir Kerimov =

Azerbaijani-Russian lawyer

Dzhangir Abbasovich Kerimov (Azerbaijani: Cahangir Abbas oğlu Kərimov, Russian: Джанги́р Абба́сович Кери́мов; 18 July 1923 – 22 February 2015) was an Azerbaijani-Russian lawyer, Doctor of Laws (LL.D.), Professor, corresponding member of the Academy of Sciences of the Soviet Union (since 1966); full member (academician) of the Azerbaijani, Serbian, Finnish, Montenegro Academies of Sciences; researcher at the Institute of State and Law of the Russian Academy of Sciences; full member of the Russian Academy of Social Sciences; member of the Social Sciences Department Bureau (section of philosophy, sociology, psychology and law); Chairman of the Scientific and Expert Council under the Union of Lawyers of Russia. He is one of the leading experts on philosophical problems of legal science, social planning and administration, theory of state and law.

== Scientific Activity ==
Kerimov is a specialist in the philosophical problems of legal science, social planning and governance, and the theory of state and law. His works focus on the general theory of law (sociology of law and philosophy of law), methodology of legal science, legislative technique, psychology of law, legal cybernetics, and comprehensive social prevention of offenses. He has authored over 800 scientific publications, including 40 monographs.
