= Hotel Ottumwa =

- U.S. National Register of Historic Places
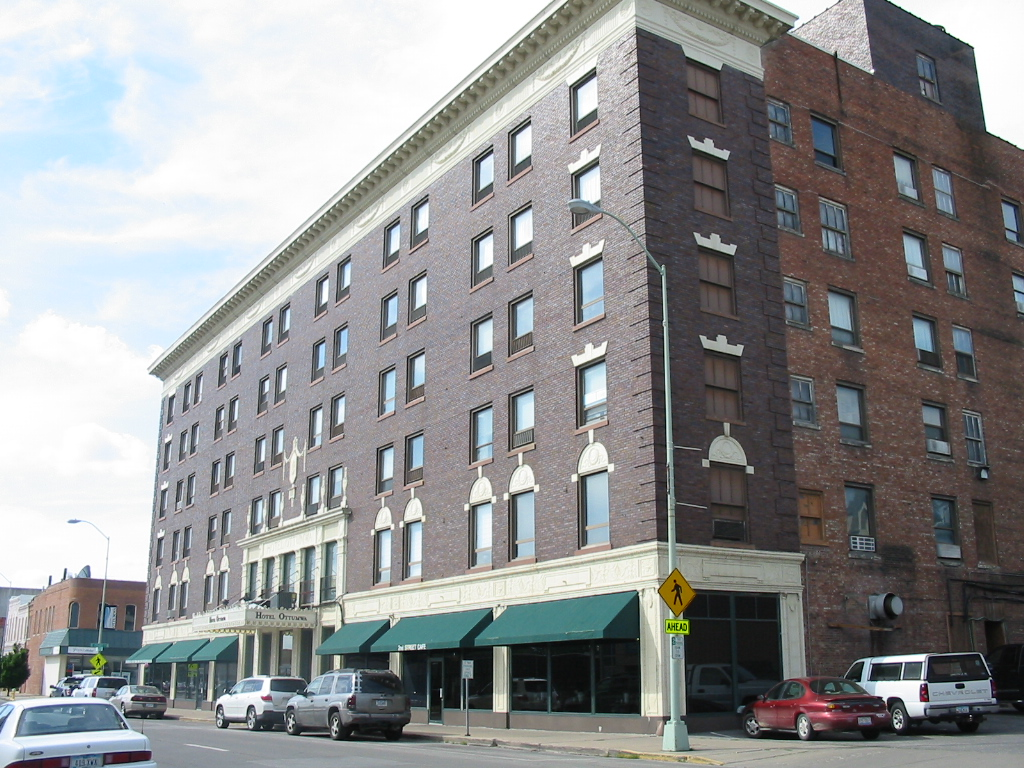

- Location within Iowa Location within the United States
- Location: 107 E. 2nd St. Ottumwa, Iowa
- Coordinates: 41°1′7″N 92°24′43″W
- Area: less than one acre
- Built: 1916-1917
- Built by: J.C. Mardis Company
- Architect: Proudfoot, Bird and Rawson
- Architectural style: Classical Revival
- NRHP reference No.: 12000815
- Added to NRHP: September 25, 2012

Hotel Ottumwa is an historic hotel located in downtown Ottumwa, Iowa, United States. Built from 1916 to 1917, it played a significant part in the city's social history and commercial development.

== History ==
By 1915, what had been Otuumwa's first-class hotel, the Ballingall Hotel, was in decline and a group of local businessmen met to plan for the new development. They organized a corporation to sell shares to the local citizens. A total of 309 people bought shares, with the average investment being $500. A further $150,000 was realized by selling bonds. A banquet was held on September 4, 1917, and a grand reception and ball was held two days later to celebrate the opening of the hotel.

Over the years various businesses occupied the main floor storefronts. Bowling alleys were added in the basement in 1927. Radio station WIAS broadcast from the hotel from 1928, when it moved to Ottumwa from Burlington, Iowa, until 1934 when it went off the air. Major renovations were undertaken in 1939 and 1951.

It was purchased by the Schwartz family in 1982, when it was operating as the Parkview Plaza. They renovated it again and returned it to its historic name. It was listed on the National Register of Historic Places in 2012.

The hotel was set to close on May 31, 2026, after the Schwartz family announced that they could not find a buyer for the hotel. Only two months after the proposed closing, a local couple purchased the hotel and reopened it.

== Structure ==
The Neoclassical building was designed by the prominent Des Moines architectural firm of Proudfoot, Bird and Rawson. The six-story brick structure rises to a height of 71.5 feet (22 m). The reinforced concrete structure was built by the J.C. Mardis Company. The exterior of the building is covered in dark brown brick and features classical details in terra cotta. From the third to the sixth floors the building is U-shaped. It is capped with a galvanized iron cornice decorated with egg-and-dart, dentils, triglyphs and metopes, rosettes, and swags.
