= Robert B. Fulton =

- Born: December 22, 1910
- Died: February 18, 2015 (aged 104); Collierville, Tennessee, U.S.
- Military career
- Allegiance: United States
- Branch: United States Navy
- Service years: 1932–1968
- Rank: Rear admiral

Robert Burwell Fulton (December 22, 1910 – February 18, 2015) was a rear admiral in the United States Navy. He graduated from the United States Naval Academy in 1932. RADM Fulton was a survivor of the sinking of USS Houston in 1942 and was subsequently a prisoner-of-war of the Japanese.
