= Helen Glass =

Canadian nurse (1917–2015)

Helen Glass OC OM
- Born: Helen Preston Glass; October 24, 1917; Regina, Saskatchewan, Canada
- Died: February 14, 2015 (aged 97); Winnipeg, Manitoba, Canada
- Occupation: Nurse
- Children: 1
- Awards: Order of Canada; Order of Manitoba

Helen Glass, OC OM (née Preston; October 24, 1917 - February 14, 2015) was a Canadian nurse, educator, administrator, and researcher.

Born in Regina, Saskatchewan, she received a Diploma in Nursing from the Royal Victoria Hospital School of Nursing in Montreal, in 1939. She then worked in different hospitals as a nurse. She began her career in teaching nursing in 1953 at the Holy Family School of Nursing, in Prince Albert, Saskatchewan. After moving to Winnipeg in 1955, she earned a certificate in teaching and supervision from the University of Manitoba in 1958.

In 1960, she received a Bachelor of Science in Nursing from Columbia University and a Master of Arts in 1961. She earned a Master of Education (1970) and a Doctor of Education (Nursing) (1971) also from Columbia. In 1962, she started teaching at the University of Manitoba's School of Nursing and became the Director in 1972. She played an important role in establishing a graduate program in nursing and in creating the Manitoba Nursing Research Institute. She was President of the Canadian Nurses Association. She also contributed to the wording and scope of the Canada Health Act in 1984.

== Honours ==
In 1988, she was made an Officer of the Order of Canada and was made a Member of the Order of Manitoba in 2008. She was inducted into the Teacher's College Nursing Hall of Fame at Columbia University. She received honorary degrees from Memorial University (1983), the University of Western Ontario (1986), St. Francis Xavier University (1991), the Université de Montréal (1993), and McGill University (1995).

The University of Manitoba named a building, the Helen Glass Centre for Nursing, after Glass in 1999 to honour her.

== Sources ==
- "Dr. Helen Glass". The University of Manitoba Libraries. Archived from the original on December 27, 2004.
