= John Fox (composer) =

British composer and conductor of light music

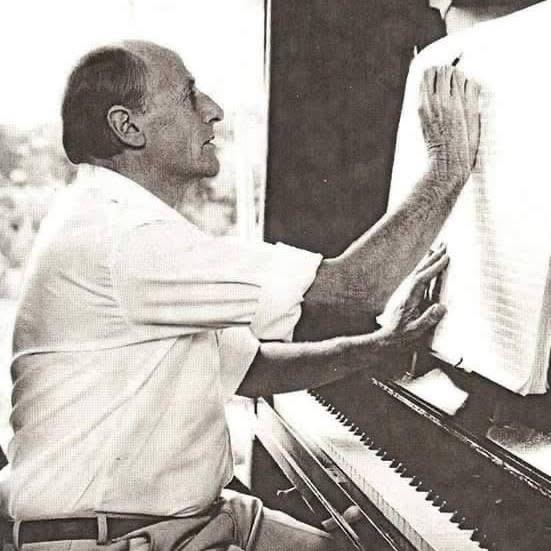
- Born: Thomas John Fox; April 30, 1924; Sutton, Surrey
- Died: February 10, 2015 (aged 90); Banstead Village, Surrey
- Occupations: Composer; Conductor; Pianist
- Spouses: Joyce Devon (m. 1980; died 2004): Perpetua

Thomas John Fox (30 April 1924 – 10 February 2015) was a British composer and conductor of light music.

Fox was born in Sutton, Surrey and was educated at Sutton West School for Boys. He also took piano lessons and by his teens had formed his own group. This then led to him playing in an RAF band towards the end of the war, and upon being demobbed, he began his musical career, initially teaching during the day and playing ‘gigs’ at night. He then went on to study at the Royal College of Music (RCM), studying composition, piano and violin.

After leaving the RCM, Fox began to play in big bands, as well as arranging and accompanying singers. He then formed the resident band at the Grand Hotel, Eastbourne. He would spend the day arranging and composing and then drive to Eastbourne each night. It was at this time that he met the singer Joy Devon, who was to join the band and eventually become his wife. She played an important role co-producing recording projects and running their music publishing company, Coniston Music.

While initially maintaining the residency at Eastbourne, he became a staff arranger for the BBC, writing for the BBC Variety and BBC Revue Orchestras. In the 1960s, these two orchestras were amalgamated to form the BBC Radio Orchestra. Fox became one of the regular conductors of the Radio Orchestra, writing thousands of arrangements for them, as well as producing original compositions. His close association with the orchestra carried on until it was disbanded in 1991. The John Fox Singers, made up of London session singers, were often added to the BBC Radio Orchestra sessions, as well as broadcasting in their own right in BBC programmes including Friday Night Is Music Night.

John Fox was a regular contributor to the main BBC Radio Orchestra Show and also to String Sound, showcasing the strings of the Radio Orchestra, for which he wrote the signature tune, "String Magic". He also recorded numerous productions for the BBC with the John Fox Orchestra, led by George French, as well as with the other BBC Orchestras, particularly the BBC Midland Radio Orchestra, with him providing a large number of arrangements for their library. The John Fox Orchestra were heard in numerous programmes on Radio 2.

As well as his work for the BBC, Fox also achieved success in the USA through his recordings for the American Beautiful Music Radio Stations that were active during the 1970s and 1980s. For these productions, particularly for the Bonneville Corporation, Fox would record selections with his orchestra at CTS or Lansdowne Studios. Commercial Records include George Gershwin BBC Records REB 156 (Reissued under title Gershwin's Greatest Hits, BBC Records REC 32) and Here There and Everywhere BBC Records REB 168.

As a composer, John Fox was a prolific writer of library music, particularly for Sonoton Production Music, for whom he would record his original compositions with orchestras in Leipzig, Budapest and London. These recordings made his compositions available to a worldwide market, for use in television, radio, film and advertising productions, gaining additional wide exposure from usage on SpongeBob SquarePants. In 1994, Fox won a STEMRA Music Award for the best film music in the Netherlands.

Throughout his career, Fox composed concert music, including Countryside Suite, Characters from the Fairy Tales, Strings in 3/4, A Surrey Rhapsody, Jovial Knights Overture, A Pastoral Reflection, Summer Overture and The Love of Joy Suite (composed in tribute to his late wife, Joy Devon). He continued to compose until near the end of his life.

== Later life and death ==
John Fox died on 10 February 2015, aged 90, in hospital near his home in Banstead Village, Surrey, and was survived by his second wife, Perpetua.
