= Mark Fischer (attorney) =

American lawyer (1950–2015)

Mark Alan Fischer
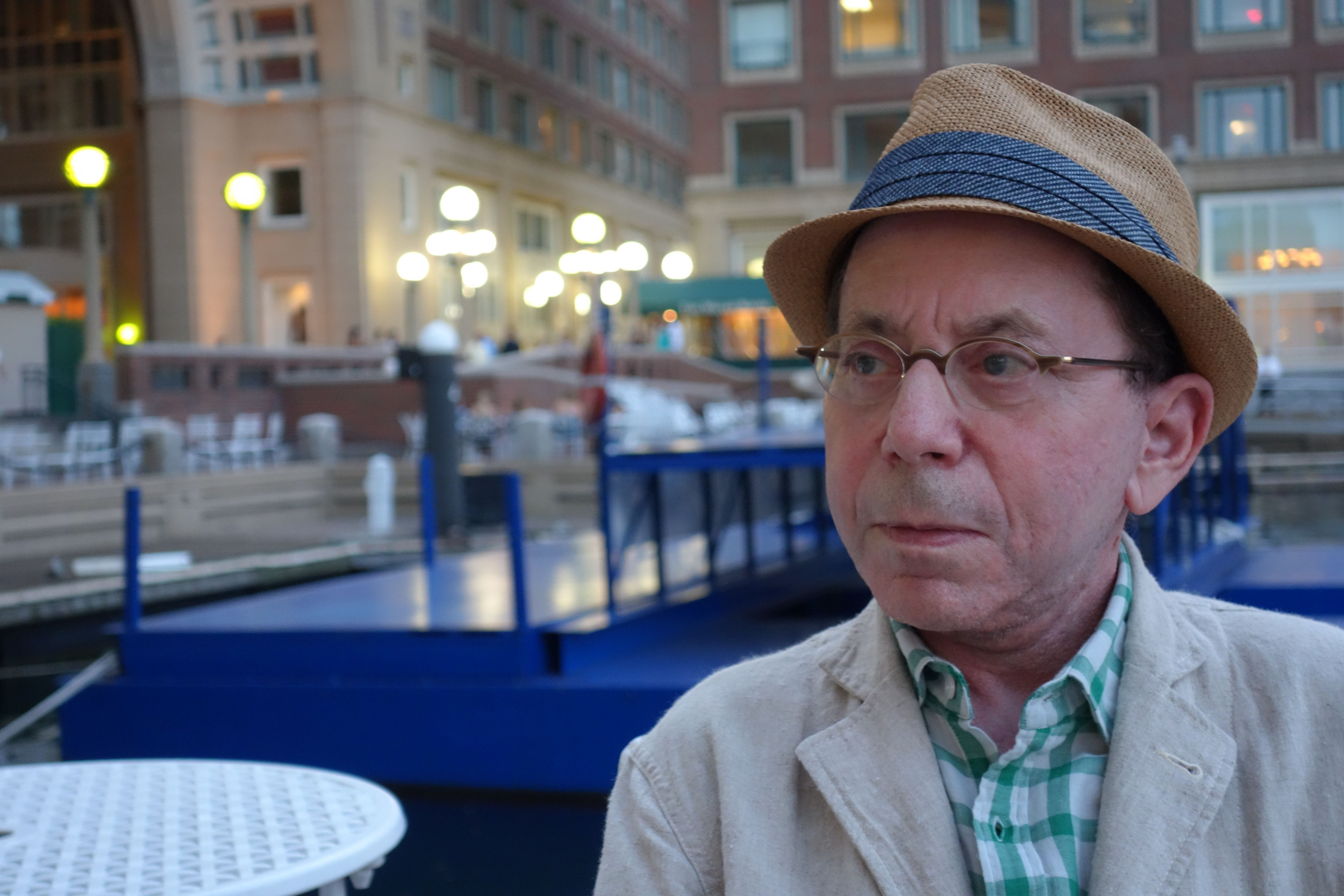
- Fischer in 2012
- Born: September 28, 1950; Evanston, Illinois, U.S.
- Died: February 18, 2015 (aged 64)
- Education: Boston College Law School, J.D., 1980
- Occupations: Author, lawyer

Mark Alan Fischer (September 28, 1950 – February 18, 2015) was a Boston-based intellectual property and copyright lawyer, speaker, and co-author of the fourth edition of Perle, Williams & Fischer on Publishing Law with E. Gabriel Perle and John Taylor Williams. He was a partner at Duane Morris LLP. Fischer represented corporate and private clients with interests in entertainment law, copyright litigation, and social media law. He helped draft the Biobricks Foundation Public Agreement, which allows scientists to make their biotechnology tools available to the public.

Fischer was admitted to practice in Massachusetts, New York, the U.S. Court of Appeals for the First Circuit, and the U.S. District Court for the District of Massachusetts. He was a longtime Red Sox season ticket holder who rated Keith Foulke's Oct. 27, 2004 toss to Doug Mientkiewicz as one of his most-treasured moments.

== Teaching and scholarship ==
Fischer taught copyright law at Suffolk University Law School, Berklee College of Music, Boston College Law School, Northeastern University Law School, and New England School of Law. He was a prolific writer and lecturer with a widely followed blog on new media and intellectual property issues. Fischer was a Trustee of the Copyright Society of the US and an Overseer of the Institute of Contemporary Art (Boston).

== GNU General Public License ==
Fischer was a contributor to the concept and adoption of the GNU General Public License.
