= Nael al-Ajlouni =

Jordanian politician

Nael Jamil Al-Ajlouni (died 20 February 2015) was a Jordanian doctor and politician, serving as Health Minister in 1998. He is the older sibling of Jordanian writer and director Haiel Al-Ajlouni and Wa'el Al Ajlouni.

Al-Ajlouni was director of the Jordanian Royal Medical Services with the rank of major general between 26 May 1988 and 15 August 1989. He became Health Minister of Jordan in 1998. After his term as Minister he led a national committee looking into the possibilities of universal health care coverage.

In January 2010, al-Ajlouni became member of the board of trustees of the Jordanian National Centre for Human Rights. He died on 20 February 2015.
