= Edmund Cranch =

American academic administrator

Edmund Titus Cranch
- Died: February 4, 2015; Florida
- Education: Cornell University
- Known for: 12th President of Worcester Polytechnic Institute
- Scientific career
- Fields: Academic administrator

Edmund Titus Cranch was an American engineering educator and academic administrator who served two terms as chair of the Department of Theoretical and Applied Mechanics at Cornell, and as dean of the Cornell University College of Engineering from 1972 to 1978. He was the 12th president of Worcester Polytechnic Institute (WPI) from 1978-1985.

== Biography ==
Dr. Cranch grew up in Westfield, New Jersey. After receiving his bachelor's degree in mechanical engineering from Cornell University in 1945, he served as an engineering officer in U.S. Navy and earned his master's degree in mechanical engineering through the U.S. Navy’s wartime V-12 officer training program. He worked for Bell Labs briefly as an electromechanical design and development staff member before he returned to Cornell to pursue his graduate studies. He earned a PhD in mechanics, mathematics, and applied physics in 1951. He started his academic career as an assistant professor in Cornell College of Engineering. He served two terms as chair of the Department of Theoretical and Applied Mechanics, and as associate dean of graduate study and research in 1967. In 1972 he was named dean of the College of Engineering. He served in that capacity until he was named president of Worcester Polytechnic Institute in 1978. During his WPI tenure, he oversaw extensive campus expansion and doubled its revenue and endowment. In 1985, Cranch was elected president of the American Society for Engineering Education, which honored him as a fellow in 1993. He was a fellow of the American Society of Mechanical Engineers, a member of Tau Beta Pi honorary engineering fraternity, president of the Cornell chapter of Sigma Xi and a member of the Society for Experimental Mechanics.
