= Mike Thresh =

British plant pathologist (1930–2015)

John Michael Thresh (17 October 1930 – 12 February 2015) was a British plant pathologist, who played a key part in the battle against the cocoa swollen shoot virus in West Africa and the cassava mosaic virus pandemic in Uganda.
