= Elchanan Heilprin =

Slovak-born English rabbi (1921–2015)

Rabbi Elchanan Halpern
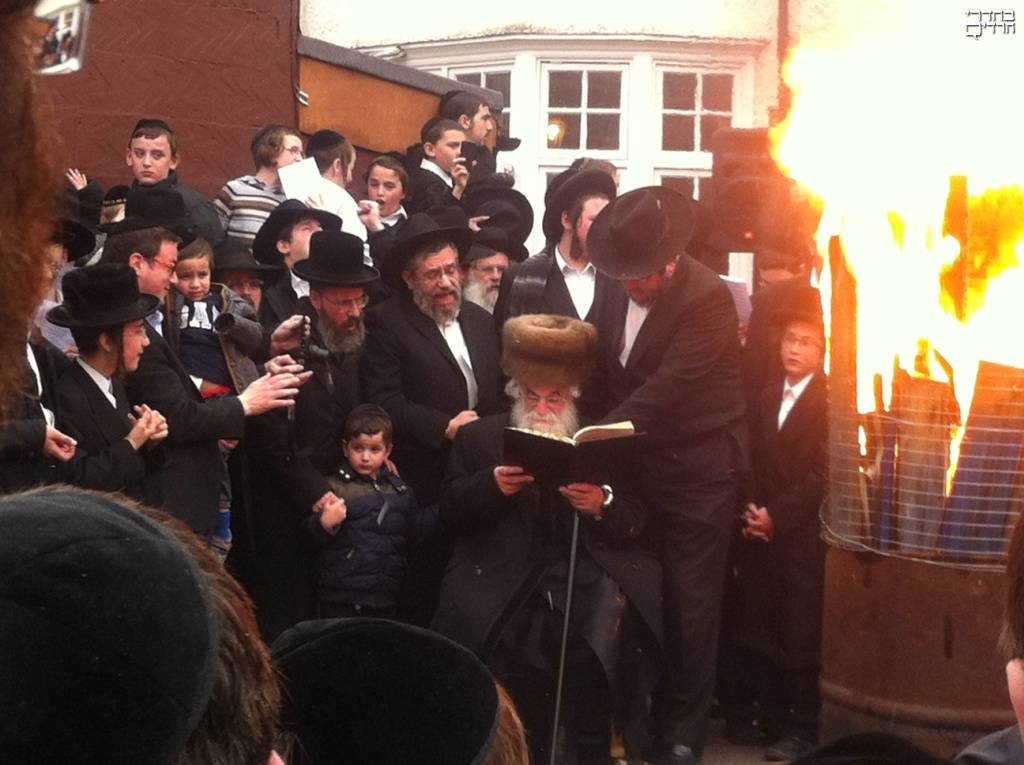

Personal life
- Born: 26 December 1921 Košice, Czechoslovakia
- Died: 18 February 2015 (aged 93) London
- Buried: Israel

Religious life
- Religion: Judaism

Jewish leader
- Synagogue: Beis Shmuel
- Residence: Golders Green, London

Elchanan Halpern (26 December 1921 – 18 February 2015) was a Rabbi in the Golders Green neighbourhood of London and President of the Union of Orthodox Hebrew Congregations. He was also known as the Av Beit Din of Radomishl after the town of his maternal grandfather, Rabbi Shmuel Engel, Rav of Radomishl.

== Life ==
He was born in Košice, Czechoslovakia. Both of his parents were descendants of Rabbi Chaim Halberstam.

In his youth, he studied several years under his grandfather, Rabbi Shmuel Engel, until the death of the latter, who was formally eulogised by Halpern, then aged 13. At age 14, Halpern corresponded with Rabbi Joseph Rosen.

After his marriage, he settled in London.

At the time of Halpern's death, he was considered one of the most senior rabbis in the world. He left behind over 1,400 direct descendants, including grandchildren, great-grandchildren, and great-great-grandchildren. Four out of his 5 sons and four sons-in-law all hold rabbinic positions.
