= Philip Godana =

Kenyan politician

Philip Galma Godana (died 14 February 2015) was a Kenyan politician. He served as a member of parliament for Moyale Constituency.

On 14 February 2015 at 2 AM Godana's house in Syokimau, Nairobi, was entered by four persons out to rob the family according to the police. When they met with resistance Godana was shot and killed. Godana's mother, wife, and three children were present in the home during the incident but were left unharmed. The robbers were reported to have gotten away with electronics and cash. During the incident Godana's neighbor, Robert Pukose, shot in the air when he heard commotion at Godana's house.

After the murder neighborhood residents protested due to rising insecurity. The killing of Godana came only one week after that of incumbent MP George Muchai.

Godana was married to Kule Galma, a Commissioner on the Independent Electoral and Boundaries Commission.
