= Jack Symons (footballer, born 1924) =

Australian rules footballer

Personal information
- Full name: Jack Symons
- Born: 19 July 1924
- Died: 20 February 2015 (aged 90)
- Original team: Essendon Stars
- Height: 174 cm (5 ft 9 in)
- Weight: 86 kg (190 lb)

Playing career^{1}
Years	Club	Games (Goals)
1944	Essendon	3 (0)
- ^{1} Playing statistics correct to the end of 1944.

Jack Symons (19 July 1924 – 20 February 2015) was an Australian rules footballer who played with Essendon in the Victorian Football League (VFL).
