= Per Olof Hulth =

Swedish physicist (1943–2015)

Per Olof Hulth (2 June 1943 – 26 February 2015) was a Swedish astroparticle physicist.

Hulth grew up in Stockholm. He graduated with a PhD degree in particle physics in 1976 from Stockholm University, the same university where he later for many years was Professor of Experimental Astroparticle Physics and in the late 1990s headed the Department of Physics. Hulth also worked at CERN in Geneva and was one of the key European participants in the AMANDA project at the South Pole, as well as its successor experiment IceCube, designed to study neutrinos from space in the polar cap ice. He was spokesperson of the IceCube collaboration from 2001 to 2005.

Hulth became a member of the Class for Physics of the Royal Swedish Academy of Sciences in 2004. He was chairman of the Education Committee of the Royal Academy and a prominent critic of for-profit independent primary and secondary schools, calling for a national ban on for-profit schools in Sweden in 2013.

He was an active member of Föreningen Vetenskap och Folkbildning, The Swedish Skeptics' Association, and served as its chairman from 1988 to 1998.

Per Olof Hulth was older brother to Mats Hulth, social democratic politician and former Commissioner of Finance of Stockholm Municipality.
