= Engrácia Cabenha =

- Branch: Women's Detachment of the People's Armed Forces of Liberation of Angola
- Rank: tenente-general

Engrácia Francisco Adão Bravo Cabenha (born November 1948) is an Angolan military officer and anti-colonial activist. She was the only woman to be part of the group of nationalists who, on 4 February 1961, invaded the colonial prisons in Luanda, giving rise to the Angolan War of Independence.

Engrácia Francisco Cabenha, who is also known as the "Queen of 4 February" and the "Queen of Liberation", was only 12 years old when she took part in the actions of 4 February in 1961, which resulted in the invasion of Luanda's colonial prisons.

To do this, she had to pass medical tests proving that she was a virgin, and was then locked in a house for 90 days, subjected to a period of fasting and spiritual preparation.

On 4 February 1961, she was the only woman among the 3,123 combatants who invaded the prisons of Luanda, the Emissora Rádio Nacional de Angola and the headquarters of the Correios de Angola, which started the armed struggle for the liberation of Angola.

Engrácia later joined the Women's Detachment of the People's Armed Forces of Liberation of Angola (FAPLA), which played an important role in Angola's anti-colonial struggle.

Cabenha is in the reserve and holds the rank of tenente-general of the Angolan Armed Forces.
