= Hawley Waterman =

American sports coach and athletics administrator

Biographical details
- Born: April 20, 1930; Annapolis, Maryland, U.S.
- Died: February 20, 2015 (aged 84)
- Education: Springfield College (1954)

Coaching career (HC unless noted)

Football
- 1955: St. James School (MD)
- 1956–1968: Hun School of Princeton (NJ)
- 1970–1971: Newark State

Lacrosse
- 1956–1969: Hun School of Princeton (NJ)
- 1969–1994: Newark State / Kean

Administrative career (AD unless noted)
- 1956–1970: Hun School of Princeton (NJ)
- 1970–?: Newark State / Kean

Head coaching record
- Overall: 6–7 (college football); 207–134 (college lacrosse)

Hawley Chapel Waterman Jr. (April 20, 1930 – February 20, 2015) was an American sports coach and athletics administrator. He was the first head football coach at Newark State College—now known as Kean University—in Union, New Jersey, serving from 1970 to 1971 and compiling a record of 6–7.

== Biography ==
Waterman was born in Annapolis, Maryland, to Hawley Chapman Waterman Sr., a colonel in the United States Marine Corps in San Francisco, and Duvall Waterman. Waterman Jr. attended and graduated from Springfield College in 1954. In June 1955, Waterman married Dorothy Joan Bridgman at St. Andrew's Episcopal Church in Hanover, Massachusetts.

In 1954, Waterman was a math and science teacher for Worcester Academy. In 1955, he was hired as the head football coach for the St. James School in Hagerstown, Maryland. After one year he was hired as the athletic director, head football coach, and head lacrosse coach for Hun School of Princeton. He resigned from his post as head football coach following the 1968 season to focus solely on his duties as athletic director and lacrosse coach.

In 1970, Waterman left the Hun School and was hired for the same three previous positions for Newark State College. He was head football coach for three seasons and amassed an overall record of 6–7. He remained as the lacrosse coach until 1994.

Waterman died on February 20, 2015.

== Head coaching record ==
=== College football ===
Year	Team	Overall	Conference	Standing	Bowl/playoffs
Newark State Squires (Independent) (1970–1971)
1970	Newark State	4–2			
1971	Newark State	2–5			
Newark State:		6–7			
Total:		6–7			
