= Sally Luther =

American politician

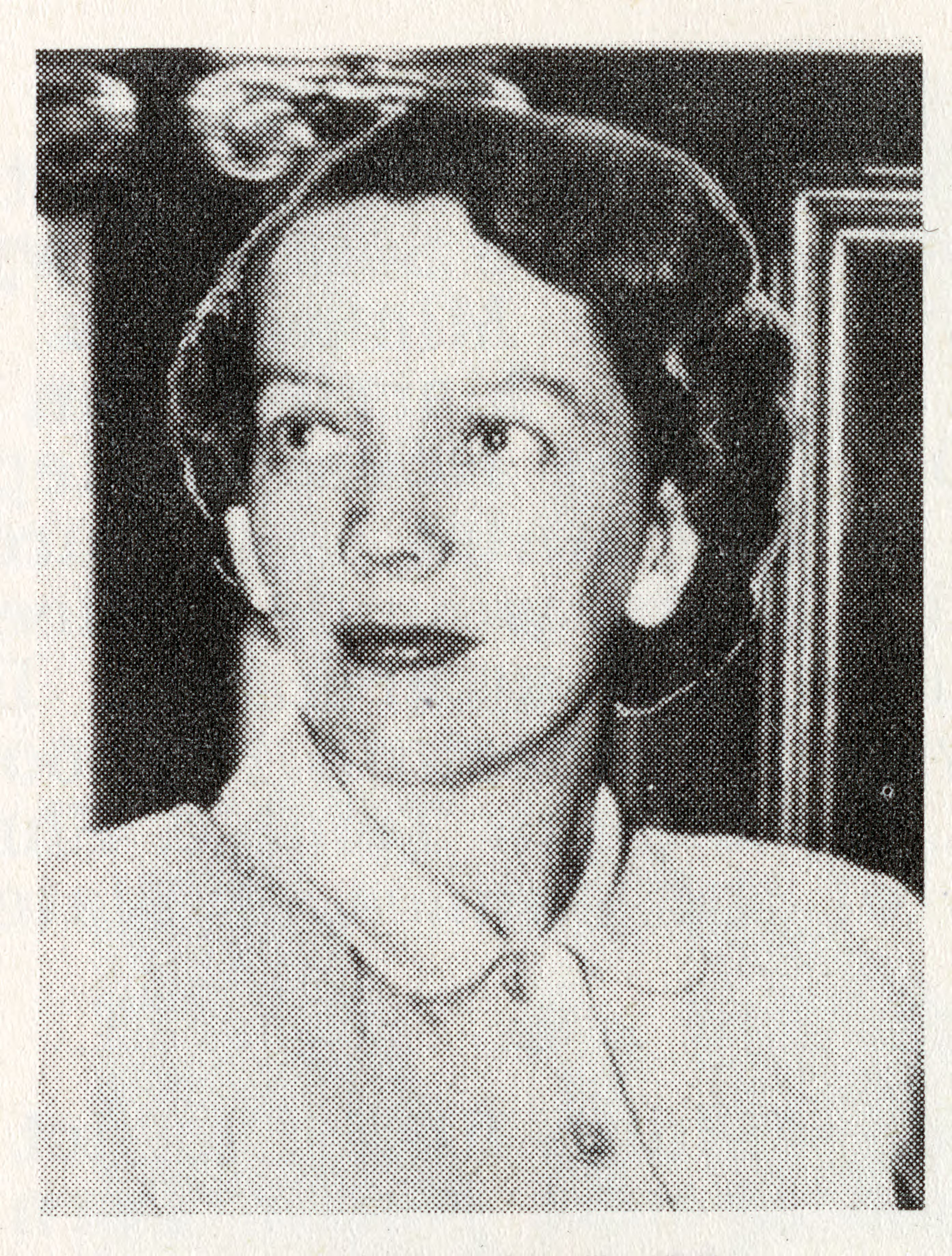

Member of the Minnesota House of Representatives from the 51st district
- In office 1951–1962

Personal details
- Born: December 6, 1918 Minneapolis, Minnesota, U.S.
- Died: February 3, 2015 (aged 96) Mount Dora, Florida, U.S.
- Party: Democratic-Farmer-Labor Party
- Spouse(s): Charles Hamilton "C.H." Luther Sr. (divorced 1963); John J. Neumaier (m.1969–2015; her death)
- Occupation: Newspaperwoman, Newspaper Reporter

Sara Luther Neumaier (née Fletcher; December 6, 1918 – February 3, 2015), known as Sally Luther, was an American politician.

She was born in Minneapolis, Minnesota. A newspaper reporter, she attended Vassar College. She served in the Minnesota House of Representatives for the 51st District from 1951 to 1962. After leaving office, she earned a M.A. degree from the State University of New York at New Paltz in 1974 and her doctorate from City University of New York in 1986. She also wrote a book about international broadcasting in space: The United States and the Direct Broadcast Satellite: The Politics of International Broadcasting in Space, wrote articles, and gave lectures. Sally Luther died of leukemia at her home in Mount Dora, Florida on February 3, 2015, aged 96.
