= Gloria Ricci Lothrop =

American historian and academic

Gloria Ricci Lothrop (December 30, 1934 – February 2, 2015) was a California historian who taught at Cal Poly Pomona, Cal State Northridge, Marymount College, and Loyola University. She specialized in American Women’s history, American Indian history, and the history of European minorities in the United States. A long-time resident of Pasadena, California, she became the first woman to join the history department at Cal Poly, and the first W.P. Whitsett Professor of California History at Cal State Northridge.

== Early life and education ==
Born in Los Angeles to Leo and Maria Lothrop, she attended Immaculate Heart College, where she received a B.A. with honors in English in 1956, and an M.A. in education in 1963. Following her graduation, she attended a Fulbright to the University of Mysore, India. Continuing to further her education, she entered into her field’s doctoral program, receiving her Ph.D. in U.S. Western American History in 1970 from the University of Southern California.

== Career ==
Within a year, she was hired by California Poly Pomona as the first full-time female history professor.

Lothrop worked as an editorial assistant for the Southern California Quarterly under her mentor Doyce Nunis between the years 1966–1970. After working as an editorial assistant, Lothrop continued to work for the quarterly for another twenty-eight years by serving on the Board of Editors. Between 1981–1983, she also served as a member of the Executive Committee for the Los Angeles Bicentennial. Lothrop was a co-writer of "one of the first books to survey the contributions of women to the westward movement." She began researching the history of women in the Old West in the 1970s, using cultural artifacts. Her efforts turned up previously unknown historical sources about women, sometimes written or indexed under the names of men. Also an author, Lothrop’s first book, Recollections of the Flathead Mission was published in 1977. Lothrop also co-authored the books California Women with Joan Jensen in 1987 and Pomona: A Centennial History and Guide to the History of California the following two years, respectively, with Doyce Nunis.

As an Italian-American woman living in the United States, Lothrop took particular interest in the history of Italian immigration. Her publications on this subject were numerous, including “Unwelcomed in Freedom’s Land,” “The Italians of Los Angeles,” “Italians Have a Legitimate History,” and “The Untold Story: The Effect of the Second World War on California Italians.” Such articles were printed in places like the Los Angeles Times, The L’Italo Americano, and the New York Times. She was active in historic preservation efforts for the Italian Hall on Olvera Street, which she also wrote articles about, and took the initiative to preserve a shrine built by Mother Frances Xavier Cabrini. Throughout her life, Lothrop also served in various positions on many historical organizations, including the California Historical Society, El Pueblo Historic Park Associates, Historical Society of Southern California, the Italian Hall Museum Association, and as the president of the Los Angeles Historical Society.

== Later life and death ==
Lothrop officially retired in 2004 and died at the age of 80 in 2015 in Arcadia, California.

== Awards and honors ==
Throughout her life, Lothrop received many awards for her work, such as the “Outstanding Teaching Award,” from the Daughters of the American Revolution in 1982 and the Daughters of Colonial Wars a year later. California State Polytechnic University, Pomona, awarded her with “Outstanding Professor,” in 1981. The Historical Society of Southern California honored Lothrop with both the “Jack Smith Community Enrichment Award,” as one of the first female recipients, and the “Carl S. Wheat Memorial Award” in 1990. The next year, Lothrop and her historical work received the “Haynes-Huntington Research Fellowship.”
