= Haron Amin =

Afghan ambassador (1969–2015)

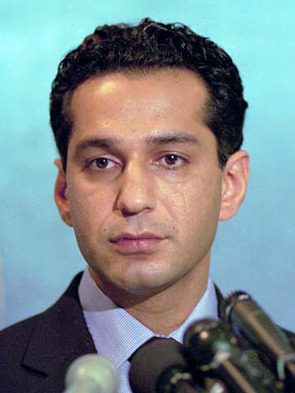
- Mohammad Haron Amin in 2001

Afghan Ambassador to Japan
- In office April 30, 2004 – April 30, 2009
- President: Hamid Karzai
- Succeeded by: Eklil Ahmad Hakimi

Personal details
- Born: Mohammad Haron Amin; 19 July 1969 Kabul, Kingdom of Afghanistan
- Died: 14 February 2015 (aged 45) Phoenix, Arizona, U.S.

Mohammad Haron Amin (Dari: هارون امین; July 19, 1969 – February 14, 2015) was the Afghan ambassador to Japan from 2004–2009. He is also known for his role as spokesman for the Northern Alliance during the U.S.-led invasion of his country after the events of September 11, 2001.

A consistent presence in American media prior to the Taliban's collapse in 2001, Amin was appointed chargé d'affaires to the United States by the interim Afghan government on January 14, 2002, led by Hamid Karzai. He was the highest-ranking Afghan diplomat in Washington for a year-long period in 2002–03, before being appointed by President Karzai as his country's first ambassador to Japan on 30 April 2004.

Born in Kabul, his Tajik family fled Afghanistan one year after the Soviet invasion of 1979, eventually settling in the U.S.

He returned to his home country in 1988 to fight with the mujahideen under their commander Ahmed Shah Massoud, who assigned Amin to Afghanistan's embassy in Washington in 1990. Amin worked for the foreign ministry in various capacities until the government's fall to the Taliban in 1996. At the time of the 9/11 attacks, Amin was serving as a diplomat of the Afghan mission to the United Nations.

Amin was distinguished in 2002 as one of 77 "People for the Future" in Newsweek. He earned a master's degree in political science from St. John's University in 2005, and later earned a Certificate of International Law in the school's Master's Program.

In 2007, drawing from his years in Japan, he wrote Afghan–Japan Relations: Lands Under the Rising Sun. The book centers on historical relations and similarities between Japan and Afghanistan, and is the first to directly compare Afghanistan's and Japan's past and cultural heritage.

== Awards ==
- Freedom, Faith and Hope Medal, Georgetown University, USA (2002)
- President's Medal, La Salle University, USA (2002)

== Death ==
Amin died of cancer, which had been first diagnosed in 2011, in a Phoenix-area hospital, on February 14, 2015.
