= Mario Verdial =

Honduran businessman (1962–2015)

- Born: 2 May 1962; San Pedro Sula, Honduras
- Died: 5 February 2015 (aged 52); Villanueva, Cortés, Honduras
- Occupation: Businessman

Mario Verdial Alsina (2 May 1962 – 5 February 2015) was a Honduran businessman who since 2001 served as co-chairman of the football club Real C.D. España as well as Vice-President of the National Autonomous Federation of Football of Honduras.

On 5 February 2015 Verdial, one of his bodyguards and a taxi driver were killed by unknown men on an ambush in Villanueva, Cortés.
