= Satwant Singh Dhaliwal =

Malaysian geneticist (1933–2015)

Dr. Satwant Singh Dhaliwal (Punjabi: ਸਤਵੰਤ ਸਿੰਘ ਧਾਲੀਵਾਲ, romanized: Satavata sigha dhālīvāla; 29 January 1933 – 6 February 2015) was a Malaysian geneticist, academic and author.

== Early life ==
Satwant Singh Dhaliwal was born on 29 January 1933. His father was Bachan Singh, a Postmaster.

After completing his secondary school education, Dhaliwal enrolled at the University of Malaya and in June 1953 it was announced that he had passed the University of Malaya 1952/53 Science (Intermediate) examinations. At the end of 1956, at 23 years of age, Dhaliwal was one of two students to be awarded the Shell Research Fellowship at the University of Malaya. In 1957 he became one of two Sikhs to be awarded a Queen's Scholarship. He received his Master of Science that year and went on to pursue a Doctorate in Genetics at the University of Edinburgh, graduating in 1959.

== Career ==
Dhaliwal pursued a career in academia. He took up the position of Demonstrator at the Department of Zoology at the University of Malaya in Singapore in 1955. In November 1968 when he became Professor of Genetics at the Department of Genetics and Cellular Biology at the University of Malaya in Kuala Lumpur. Dhaliwal stayed with the University of Malaya, through to his retirement.

He was a frequent attendee and speaker at conferences all over the world, and was Malaysia's representative to the Council of Pacific Science Congress. He retired in 1992 at the age of 59.

Dhaliwal's name has been listed among the eminent Sikhs of the country, as early as 1978.
