= Gerald Turkewitz =

American developmental psychologist

- Born: February 25, 1933; New York City, US
- Died: February 24, 2015 (aged 81)
- Education: City College of New York; New York University
- Known for: Developmental psychobiology
- Spouse: Myrna Turkewitz
- Scientific career
- Fields: Developmental psychology
- Institutions: Graduate Center, CUNY; Hunter College
- Thesis: The development of spatial orientation in relation to the effective perceptual environment in neonate rats (1967)
- Doctoral advisor: T. C. Schneirla

Gerald Turkewitz (February 25, 1933 – February 24, 2015) was an American psychologist who helped to pioneer the field of developmental psychobiology. He is also recognized for his contributions to child development and the study of human infancy. His influences included Daniel S. Lehrman and T. C. Schneirla, the latter of whom was his Ph.D. advisor at New York University.
