= Wilhelm Baumann (politician) =

German politician (1925–2015)

- Born: 22 December 1925; Schweinfurt, Bavaria, Germany
- Died: 16 February 2015 (aged 89); Schweinfurt
- Occupation: Politician
- Political party: Christian Social Union of Bavaria

Wilhelm Baumann (22 December 1925 - 16 February 2015) was a German politician from the Christian Social Union of Bavaria. He was a member of the Landtag of Bavaria from 1978 to 1990.
