= Clyde W. Sare =

American politician

Clyde Webster Sare (April 9, 1936 – February 8, 2015) was an American politician and businessman.

Born in Bartlesville, Oklahoma, Sare went to high school and to Oklahoma State University. He was in the storage and real estate business. From 1959 to 1963, Sare served in the Oklahoma House of Representatives as a Democrat. He died in Bartlesville, Oklahoma.
