= Engracia Pastora Pérez Yépez =

Venezuelan culinary artisan

- Born: 1910; El Cerrito, Lara state, Venezuela
- Died: 8 February 2015 (aged 104–105)
- Other name: Niña Engracia
- Occupation: Culinary artisan

Engracia Pastora Pérez Yépez (1910 – 8 February 2015), better known as Niña Engracia, was a Venezuelan culinary artisan from El Tocuyo who made acemitas, emblematic of the city, as well as oven bread, Tunja bread and other sweets.

== Biography ==
Pastora Pérez Yépez was born in the hamlet of El Cerrito, on the road to Los Boros and Curarigua, in Lara state, Venezuela. Her parents were Martín Pérez, a farmer, and her mother Aquilina Yépez, whom she lost at a very early age. Her nickname, literally "girl", derives from the fact that she never married. Due to her mastery in the kitchen, she dedicated herself to making traditional breads. Her first attempts were a failure, the acemitas did not set, until she was taught the culinary skills to which she dedicated herself until 1985, when her second cousin retired her at the age of 75. She lived in the Los Hornos neighborhood, on Carrera 13 between 8 and 9, where she also founded her business in 1942.
