= Walter G. May =

Canadian engineer and academic (1918–2015)

- Born: November 28, 1918; Saskatchewan, Canada
- Died: February 18, 2015 (aged 96); Virginia Beach, Virginia, U.S.

Academic background
- Education: University of Saskatchewan (BS, MS); Massachusetts Institute of Technology (PhD)

Academic work
- Discipline: Chemical engineering
- Sub-discipline: Fluidization; Liquefied natural gas technology Isotope separation
- Institutions: University of Saskatchewan; ExxonMobil; University of Illinois Urbana-Champaign

Walter G. May (November 28, 1918 – February 18, 2015) was a Canadian engineer who held a distinguished professorship at University of Illinois Urbana-Champaign.

== Early life and education ==
May was born in Saskatchewan. He earned a Bachelor of Science degree in chemical engineering and Master of Science in chemistry from the University of Saskatchewan. He later earned a PhD in chemical engineering from the Massachusetts Institute of Technology.

== Career ==
In 1943, May returned to the University of Saskatchewan as a professor of chemical engineering. He joined the Exxon Research and Engineering Company in 1948 and worked as a senior science advisor from 1978 to 1983.

May was elected to the American Institute of Chemical Engineers and National Academy of Engineering in recognition of his contributions to engineering theory and practice in fluidization, high-energy propellants, LNG technology, and centrifugal isotope separation.
