= Julius Ludorf =

German footballer

Personal information
- Date of birth: 2 December 1919
- Place of birth: Oer-Erkenschwick, Weimar Republic
- Date of death: 1 February 2015 (aged 95)
- Place of death: Germany
- Position: Forward

Senior career*
Years	Team	Apps	(Gls)
1935–1940	SpVgg Erkenschwick		
1940–1941	Hannover 96		
1946	Kickers Offenbach		
1946–1953	SpVgg Erkenschwick		
- * Club domestic league appearances and goals

Julius Ludorf (2 December 1919 – 1 February 2015) was a German footballer who played as a forward for SpVgg Erkenschwick, Hannover 96 and Kickers Offenbach.
