= 2015 in New Zealand =

- Decades: 1990s; 2000s; 2010s; 2020s
- See also: History of New Zealand; List of years in New Zealand; Timeline of New Zealand history

The following lists events that happened during 2015 in New Zealand.

== Population ==
National

Estimated populations as at 30 June.

- New Zealand total – 4,596,700
- North Island – 3,519,800
- South Island – 1,076,300

Main urban areas

Estimated populations as at 30 June.

- Auckland – 1,454,300
- Blenheim – 30,600
- Christchurch – 381,800
- Dunedin – 117,400
- Gisborne – 35,700
- Hamilton – 224,000
- Invercargill – 50,300
- Kapiti – 41,300
- Napier-Hastings – 129,700
- Nelson – 64,800
- New Plymouth – 56,300
- Palmerston North – 83,500
- Rotorua – 56,800
- Tauranga – 130,800
- Wellington – 398,300
- Whanganui – 39,400
- Whangārei – 55,400

== Incumbents ==
=== Regal and vice-regal ===
- Head of State – Elizabeth II
- Governor-General – Jerry Mateparae
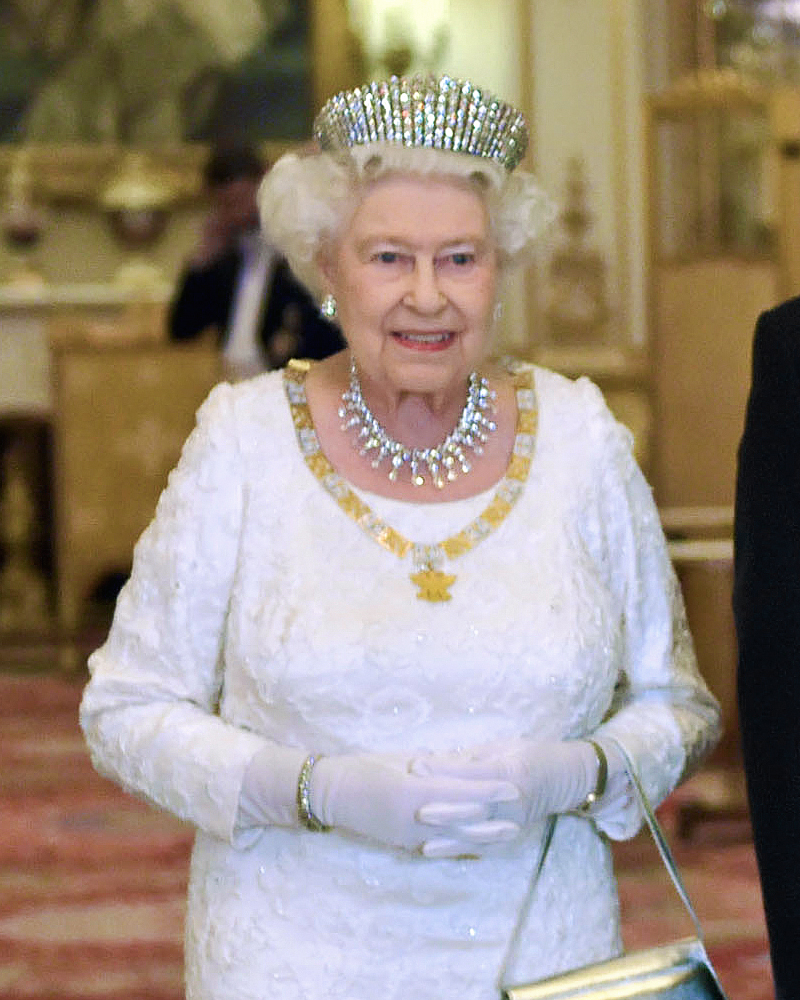
Elizabeth II

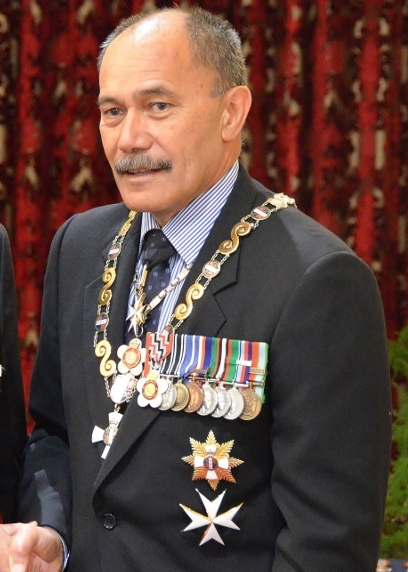
Jerry Mateparae

=== Government ===
2015 is the first full year of the 51st Parliament, which first sat on 21 October 2014.

The Fifth National Government, first elected in 2008, continues.

- Speaker of the House – David Carter
- Prime Minister – John Key
- Deputy Prime Minister – Bill English
- Leader of the House – Gerry Brownlee
- Minister of Finance – Bill English
- Minister of Foreign Affairs – Murray McCully
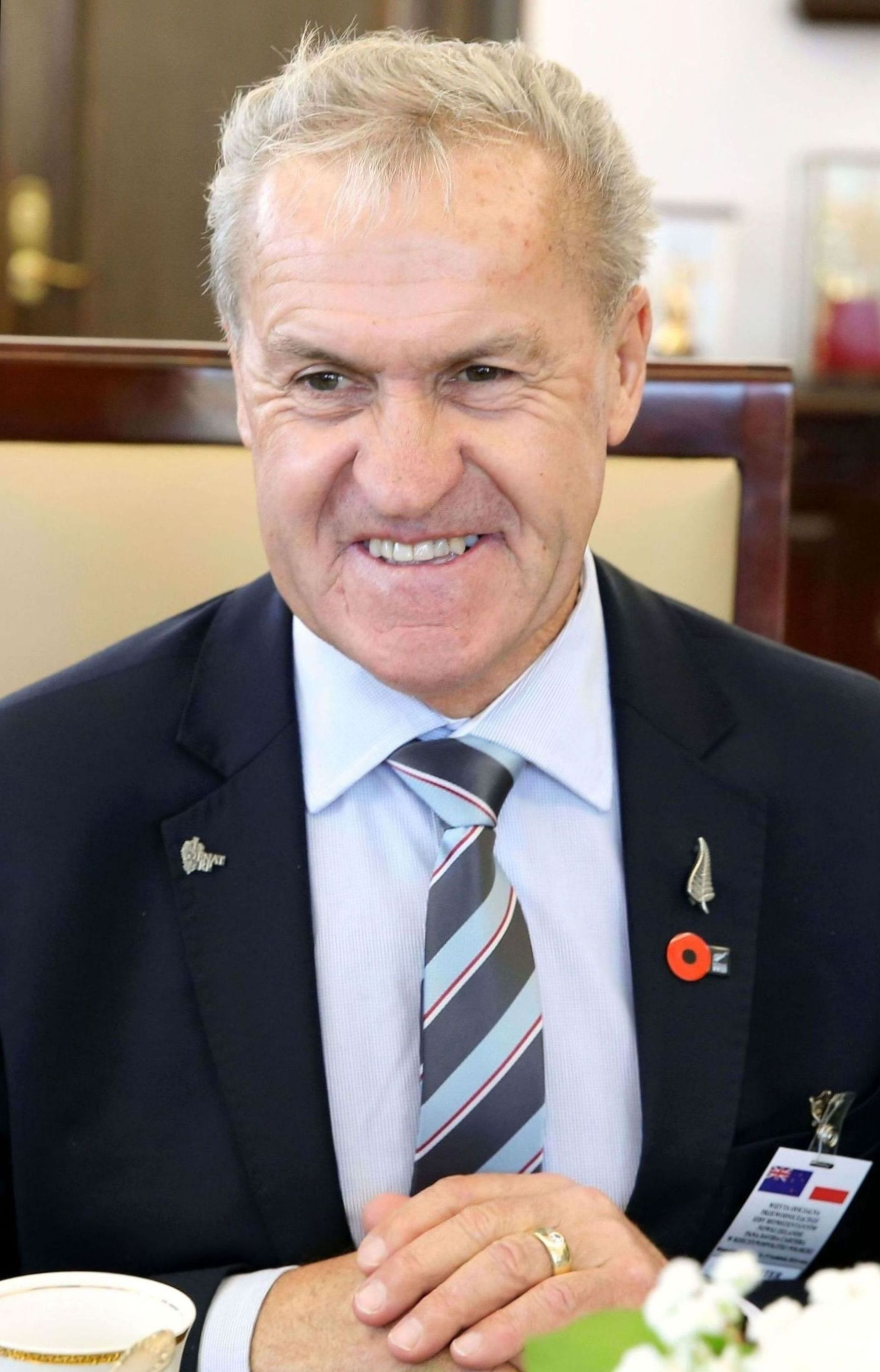
David Carter

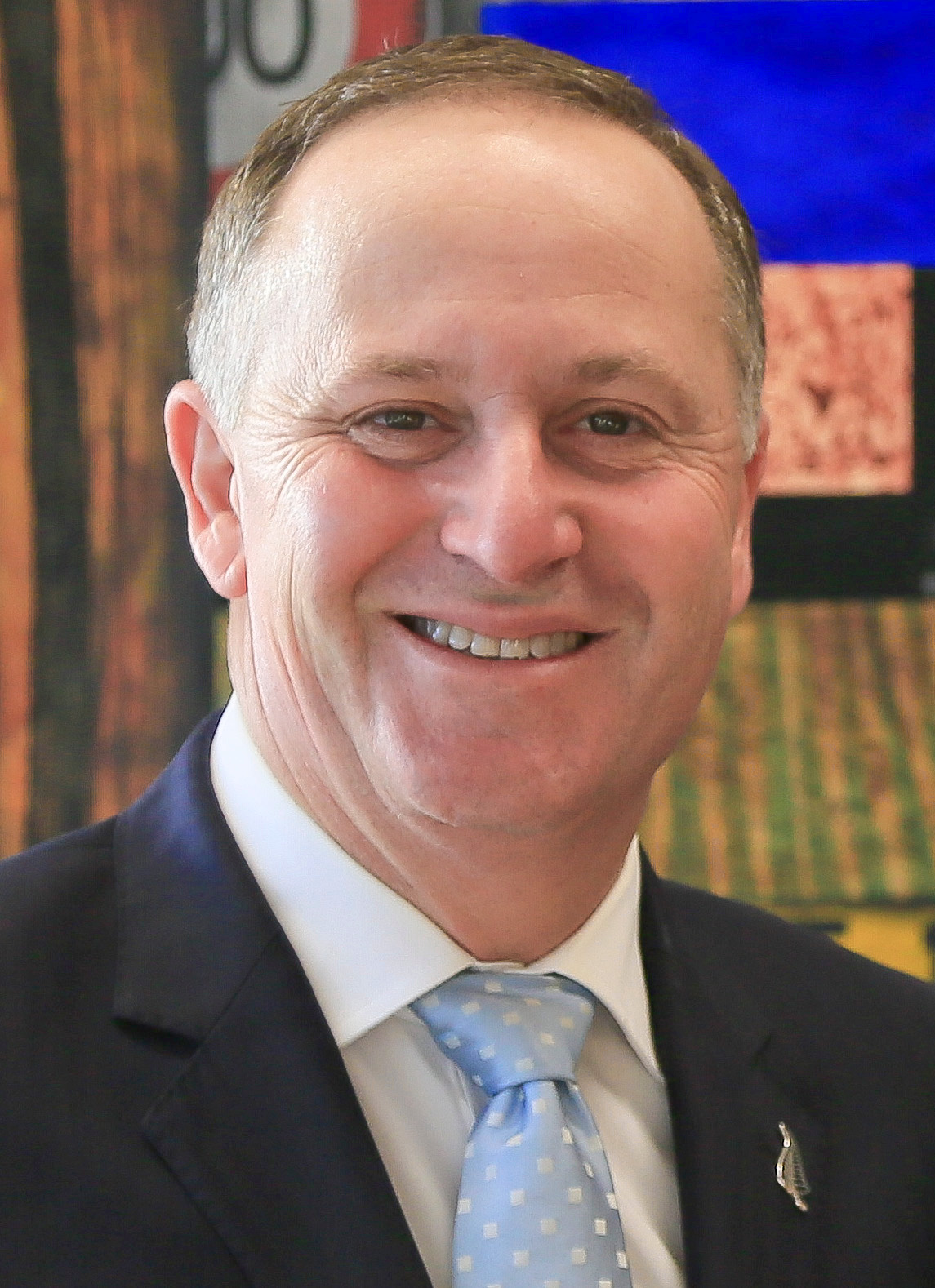
John Key

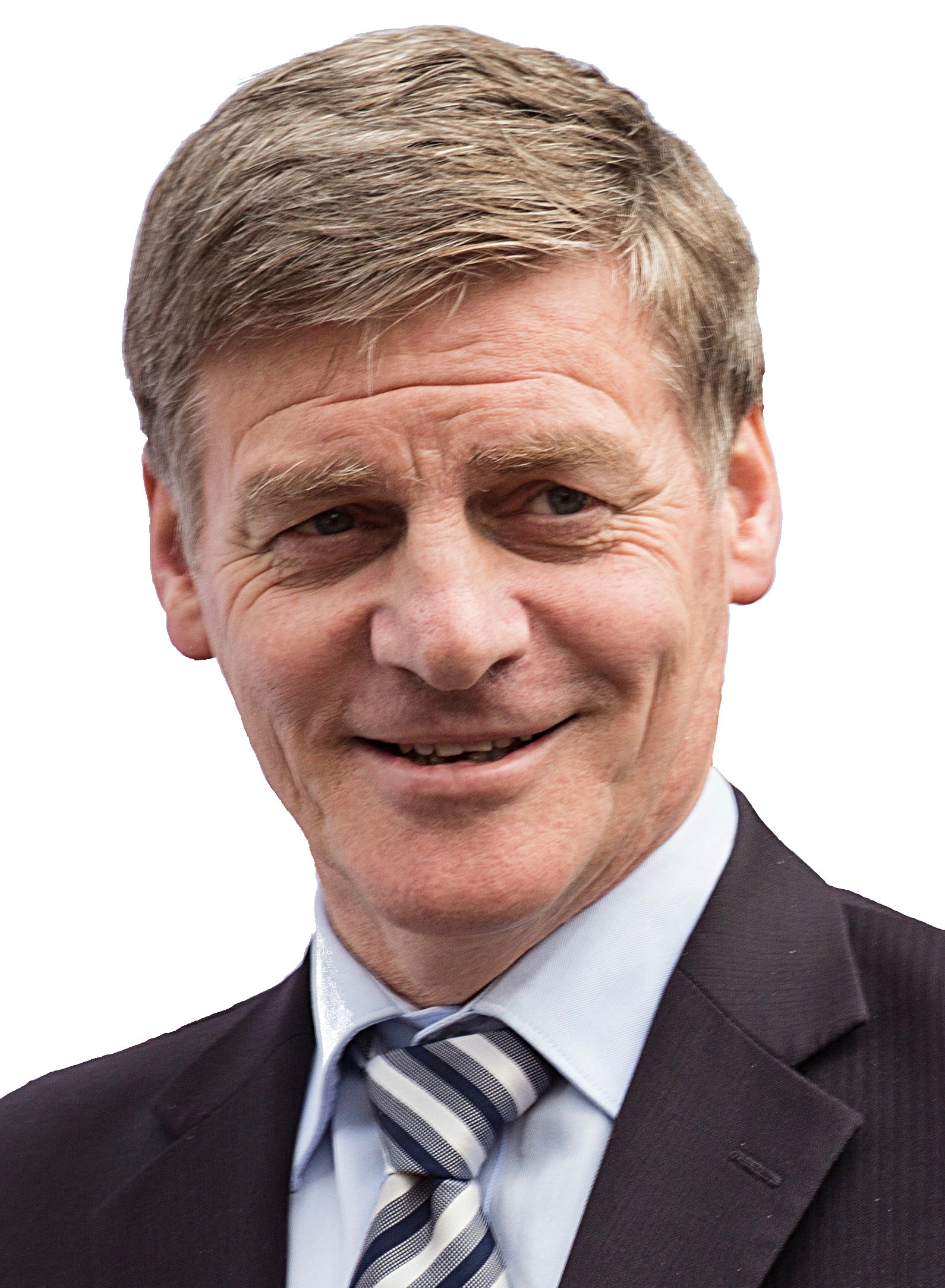
Bill English

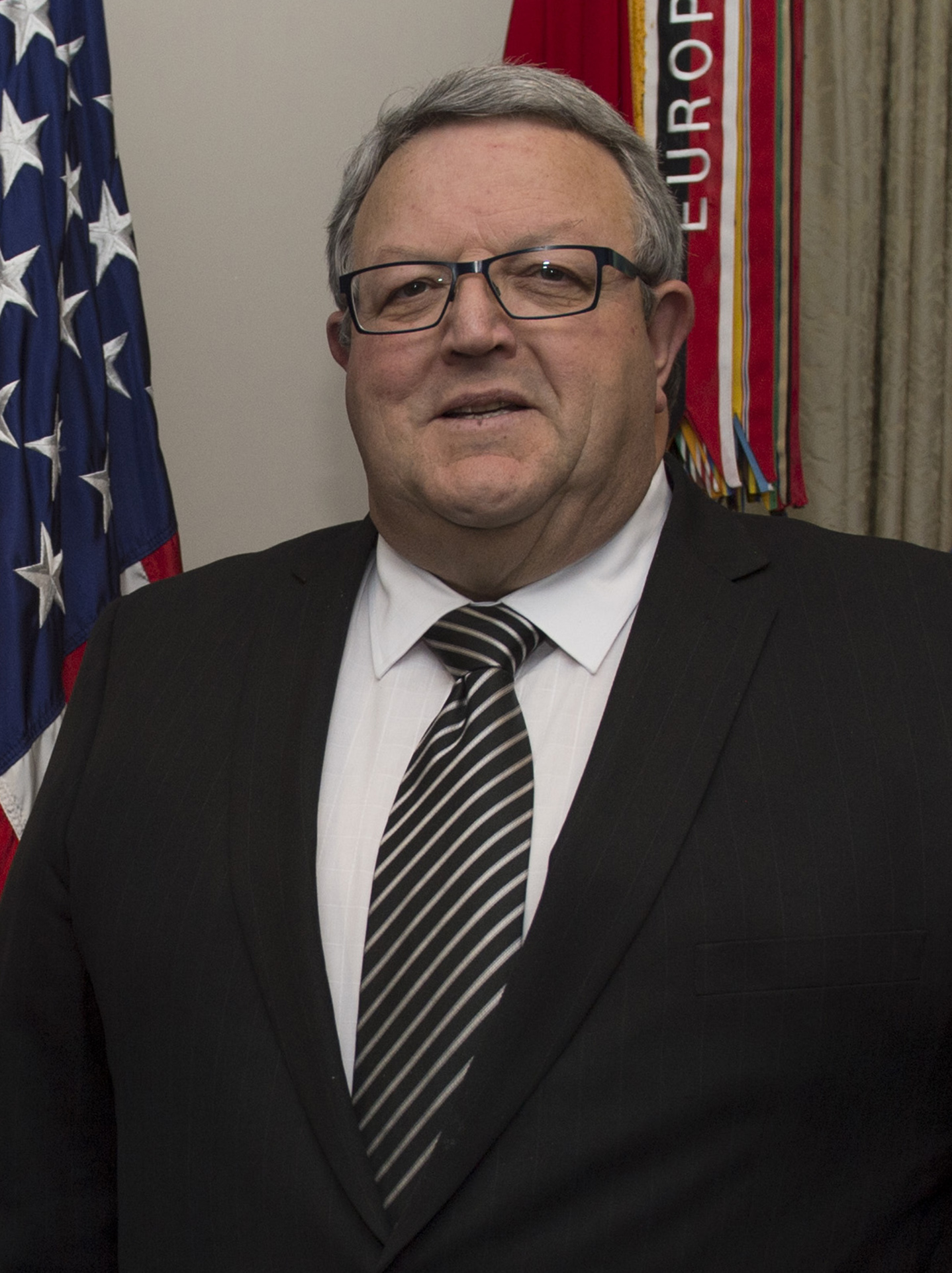
Gerry Brownlee

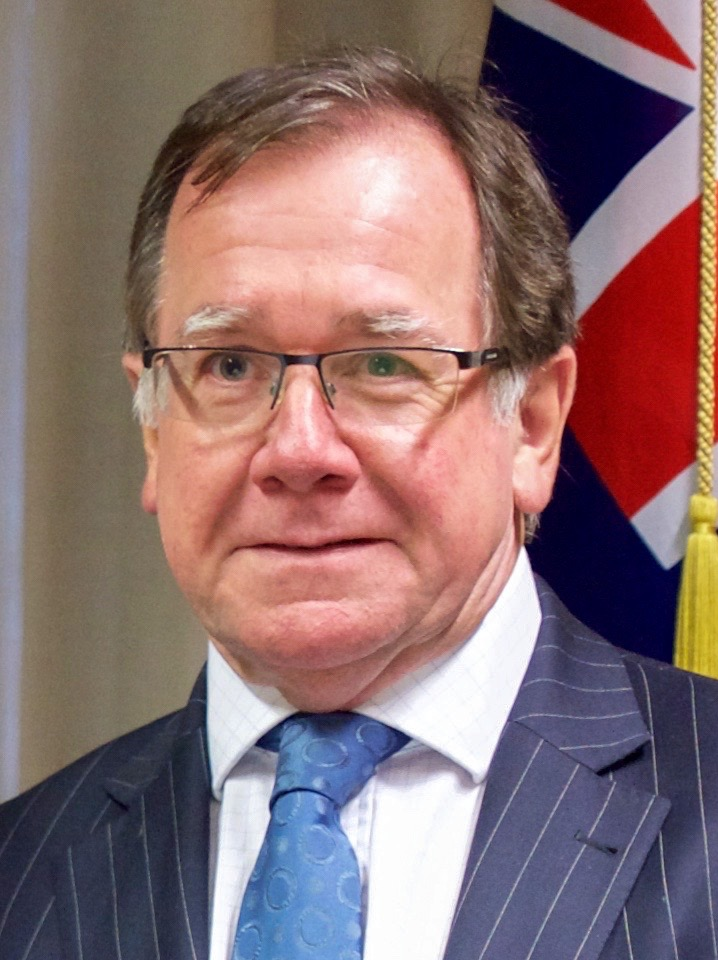
Murray McCully

=== Other party leaders ===
- Labour – Andrew Little
- Green – Russel Norman until 30 May then James Shaw, and Metiria Turei
- New Zealand First – Winston Peters
- Māori Party – Te Ururoa Flavell and Marama Fox
- ACT New Zealand – David Seymour
- United Future – Peter Dunne
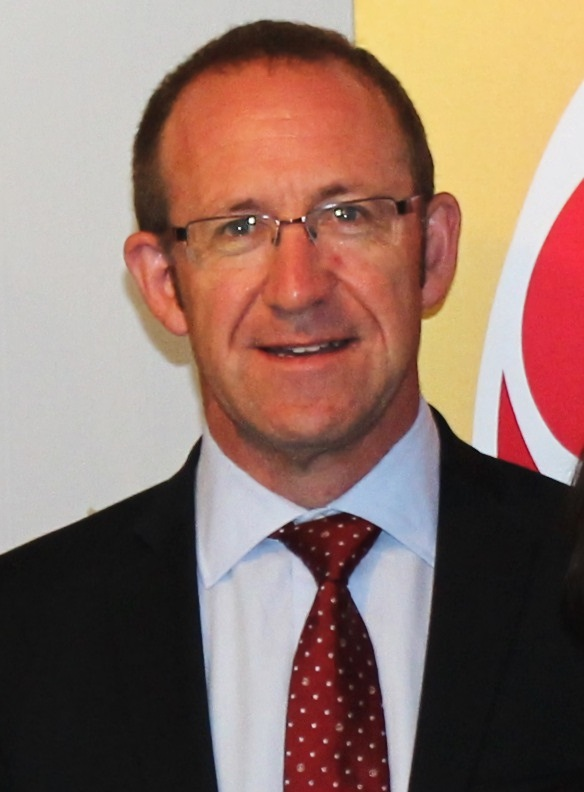
Andrew Little

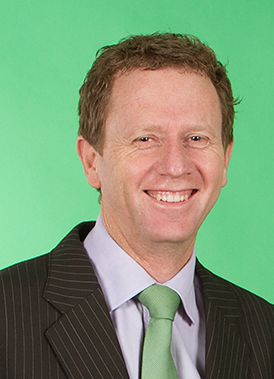
Russel Norman

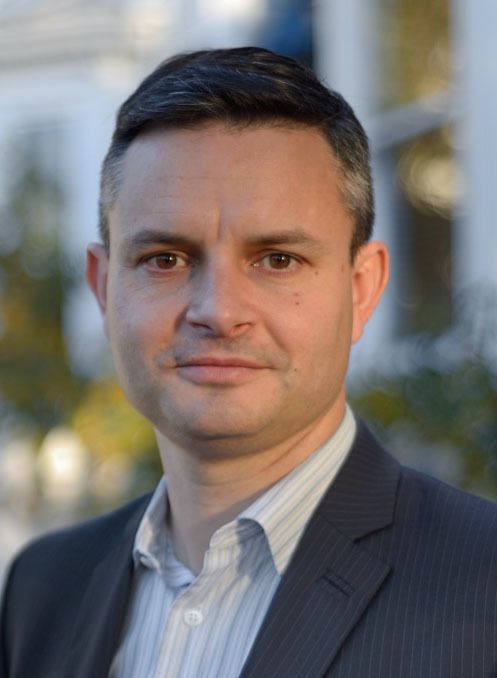
James Shaw

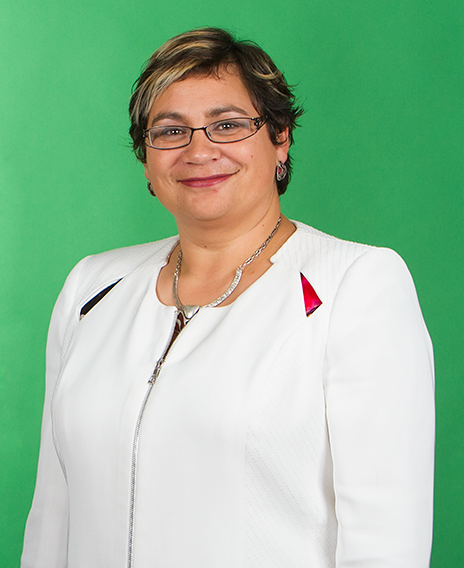
Metiria Turei

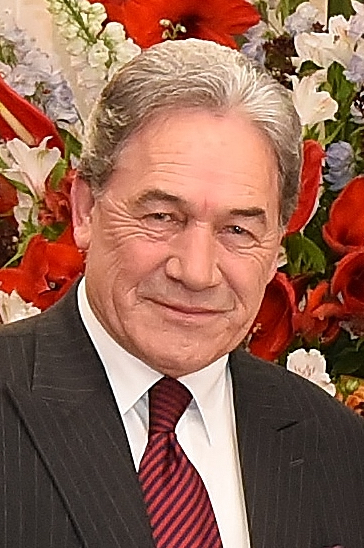
Winston Peters

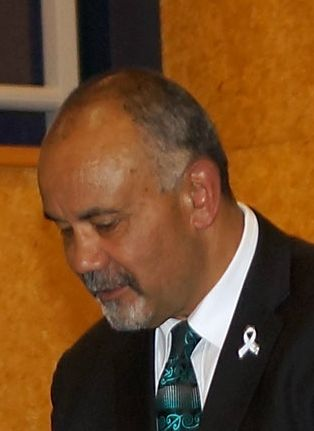
Te Ururoa Flavell

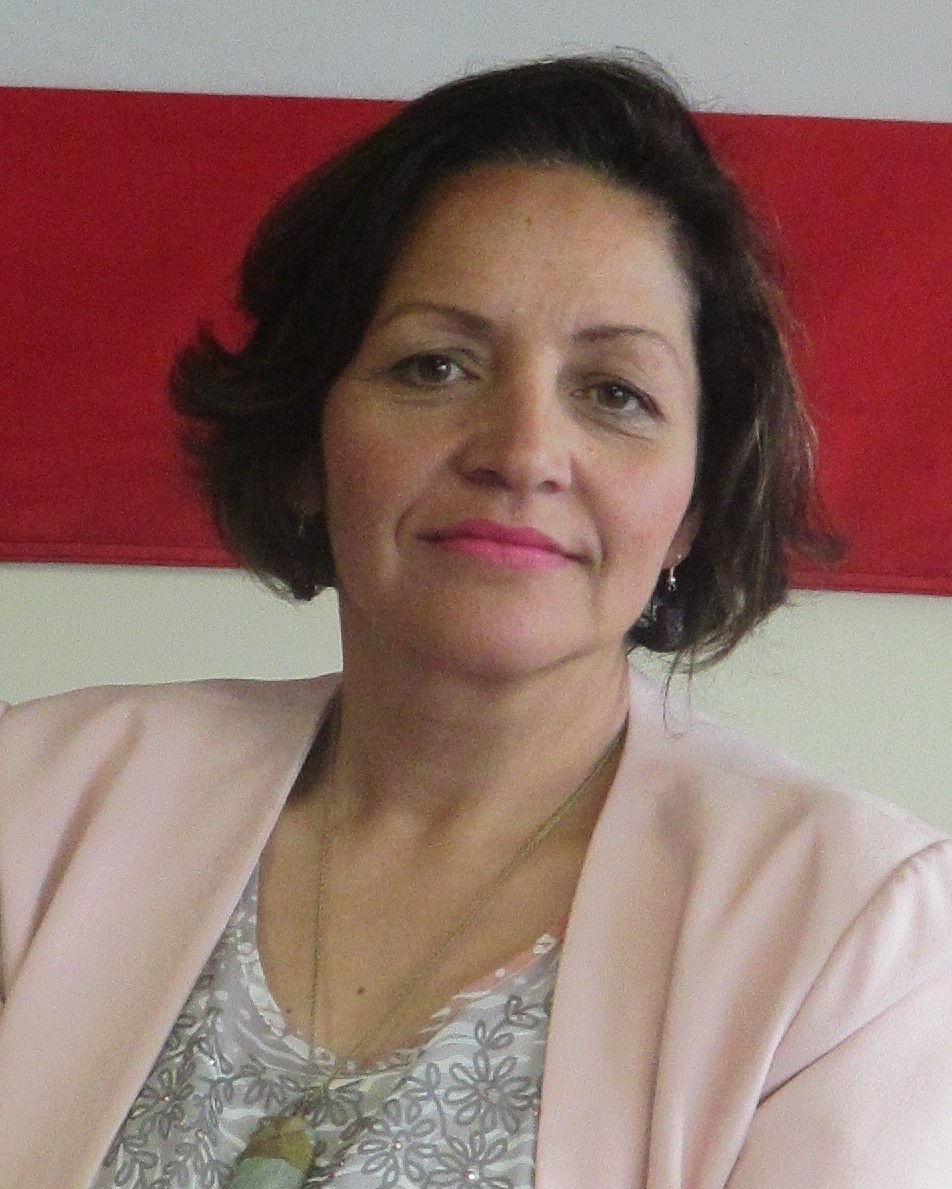
Marama Fox

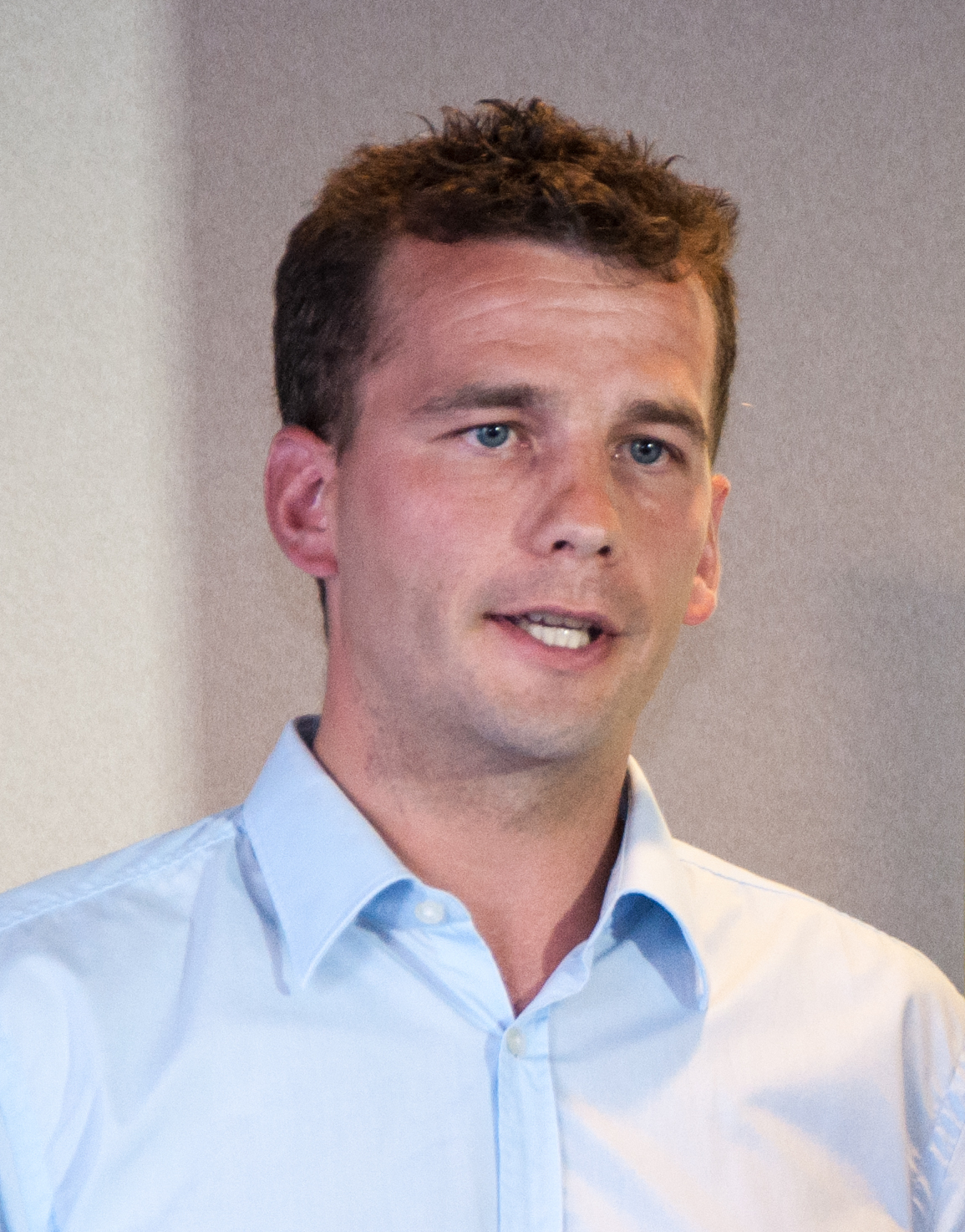
David Seymour

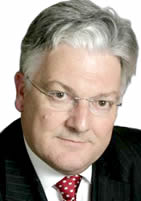
Peter Dunne

=== Judiciary ===
- Chief Justice – Sian Elias
- President of the Court of Appeal – Ellen France
- Chief High Court judge – Helen Winkelmann, and then Geoffrey Venning from 1 June
- Chief District Court judge – Jan-Marie Doogue
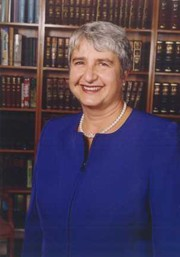
Sian Elias

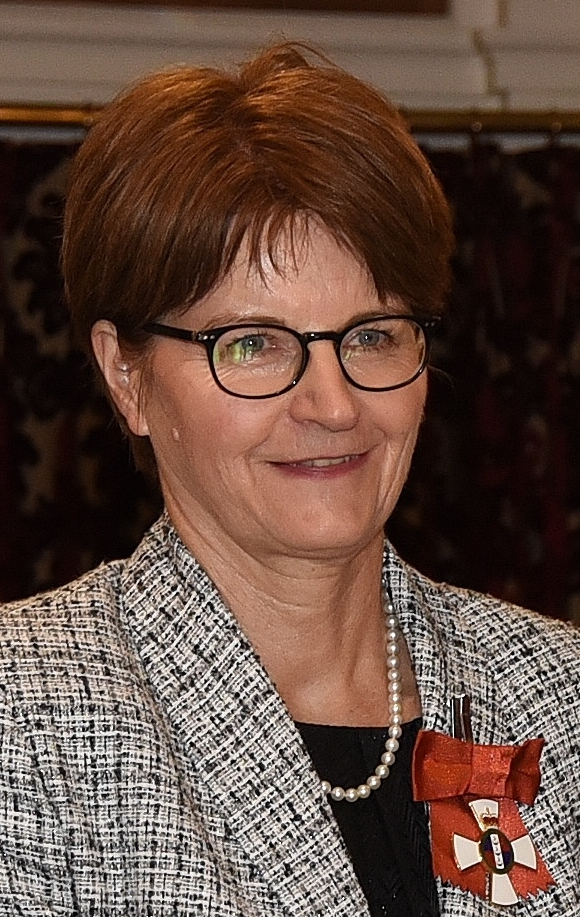
Ellen France

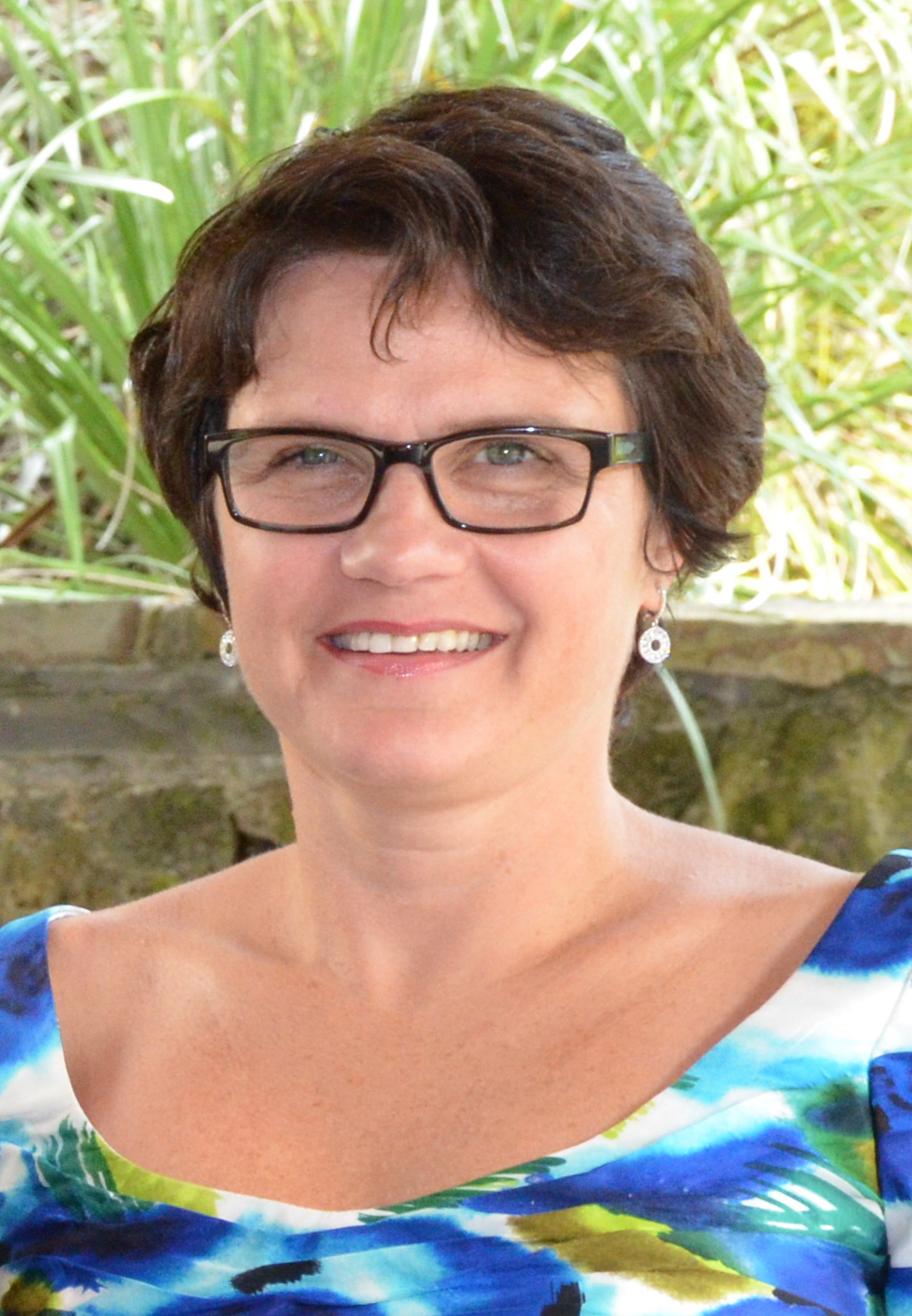
Helen Winkelmann

=== Main centre leaders ===
- Mayor of Auckland – Len Brown
- Mayor of Tauranga – Stuart Crosby
- Mayor of Hamilton – Julie Hardaker
- Mayor of Wellington – Celia Wade-Brown
- Mayor of Christchurch – Lianne Dalziel
- Mayor of Dunedin – Dave Cull
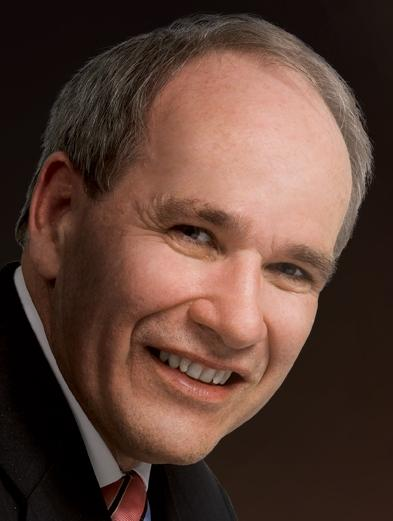
Len Brown

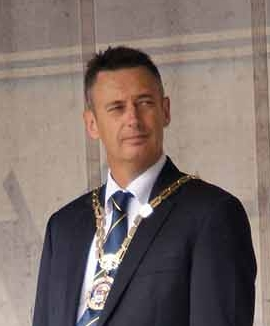
Stuart Crosby

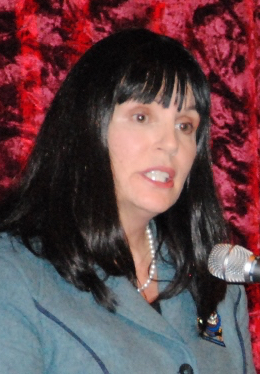
Julie Hardaker

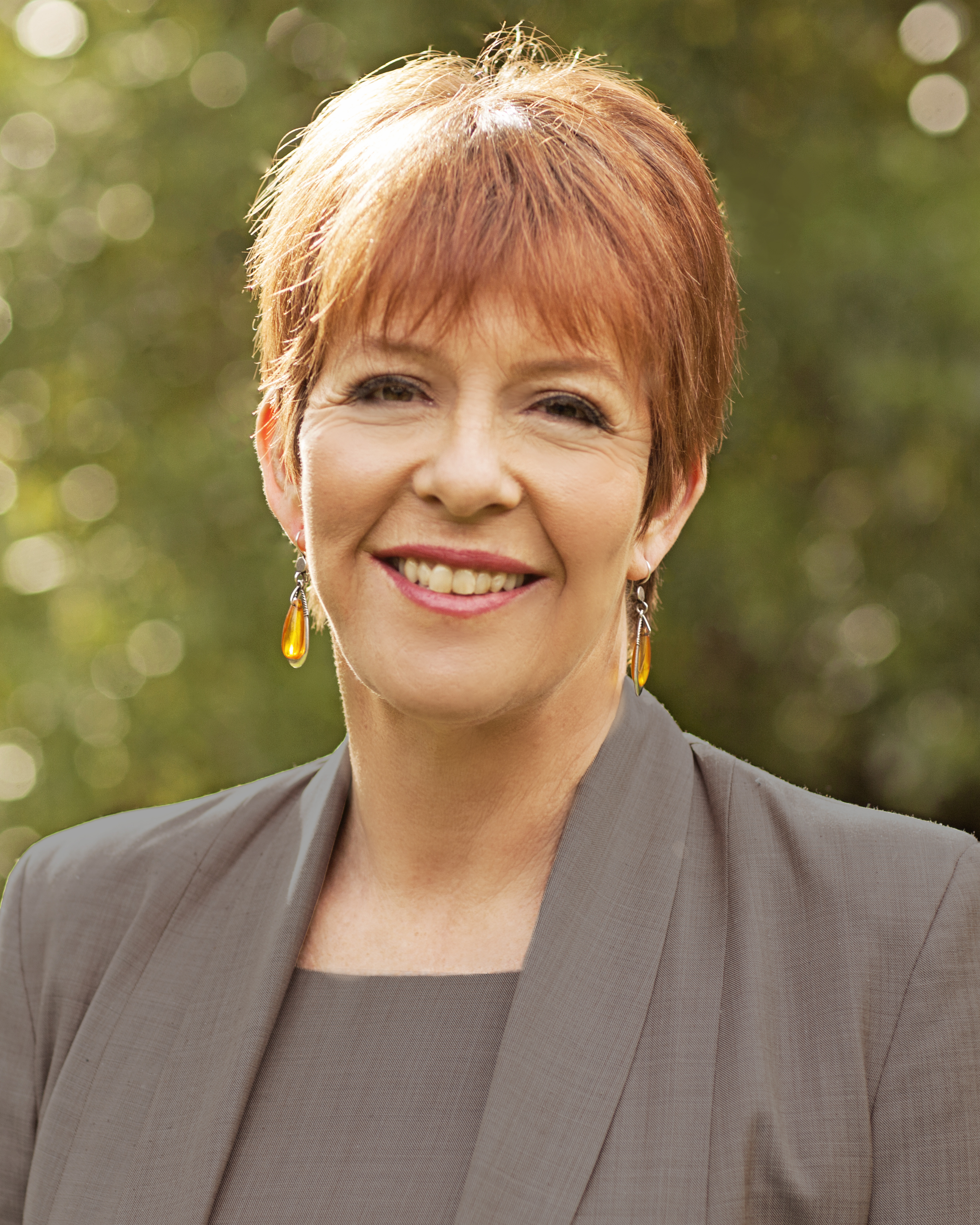
Celia Wade-Brown

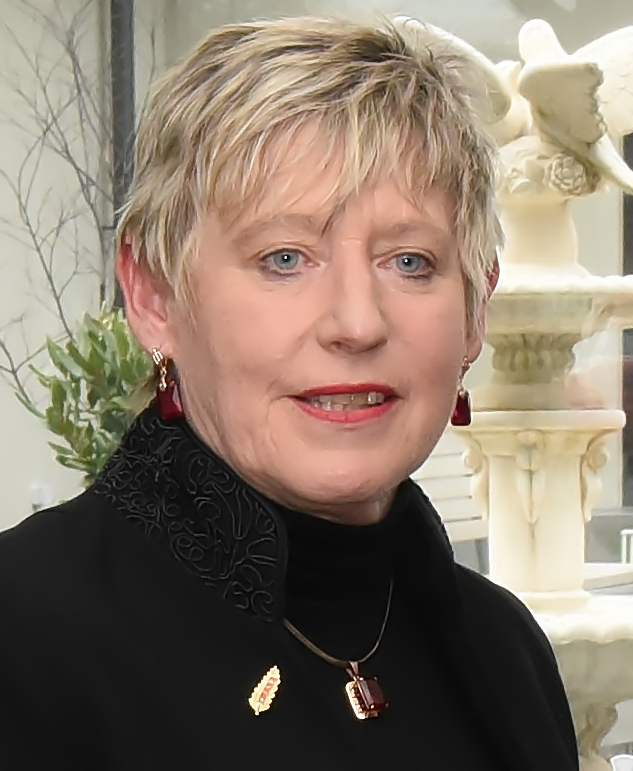
Lianne Dalziell

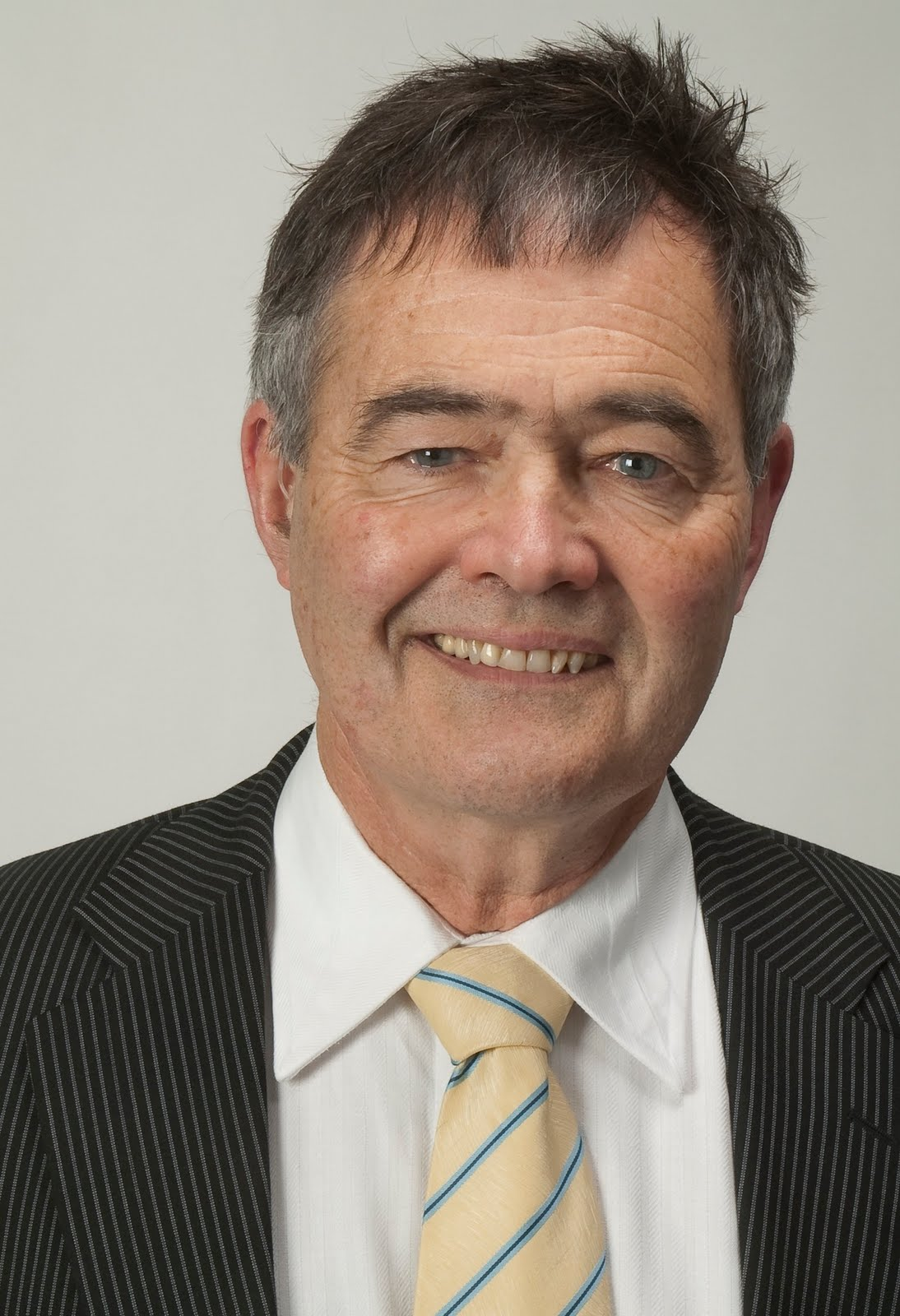
Dave Cull

== Arts and literature ==
=== Performing arts ===
Benny Award presented by the Variety Artists Club of New Zealand to Johnny Devlin.

== Events ==
=== January ===
- 1 January – New Zealand begins its two-year term as a non-permanent member of the United Nations Security Council, after being elected on the first ballot in the 2014 election.

=== February ===
- 12 February – Sky New Zealand launches its Neon streaming service.
- 14 February – The 2015 Cricket World Cup, jointly hosted between Australia and New Zealand, began in Christchurch with New Zealand winning against Sri Lanka

=== March ===
- 16 March – The remnants of Cyclone Pam move down the east coast of New Zealand causing evacuations, heavy flooding, and power outages.
- 24 March – Netflix launches in New Zealand.
- 28 March – A by-election was held in the Northland electorate to replace MP Mike Sabin of the National Party who resigned on 30 January. The electorate was regarded as a safe National seat, but was won by Winston Peters of New Zealand First.

=== April ===
- 24 April – A magnitude 6.2 earthquake strikes south-east of Saint Arnaud in the Tasman District.

=== May ===
- 14 May – Flooding occurs throughout the Wellington Region, leading to 27 homes in the Kapiti Coast being evacuated.
- 31 May – The Christchurch Central Police Station is demolished by implosion following damage from the 2011 Christchurch earthquake.

=== June ===
- 3 June – Heavy rain in the coastal Otago Region causes heavy flooding in South Dunedin, which was exacerbated by a breakdown of the Portobello pumping station.
- 20 June –
  - State of emergencies are declared in Rangitikei District, Whanganui District and South Taranaki District due to flooding.
  - Serbia win the FIFA U-20 World Cup after defeating Brazil in the final at North Harbour Stadium in Auckland.

=== September ===
- A temporary ban on the 2013 book Into the River creates controversy.
- 1 September – The Flag Consideration Panel releases the short list of flag options

=== December ===
The Lockwood silver fern flag selected in the first referendum on the New Zealand flag.

- 11 December – Voting closes on the first referendum on the New Zealand flag closes, with the black and blue variant of the Lockwood silver fern flag advancing to the second referendum.

== Holidays and observances ==
- 6 February – Waitangi Day
- 25 April – Anzac Day
- 27 April – Anzac Day public holiday
- 1 June – Queen's Birthday Monday
- 26 October – Labour Day
- 25 December – Christmas Day

== Sport ==
=== Awards ===
- Halberg Awards
  - Supreme Award – All Blacks (rugby)
  - Sportsman – Kane Williamson (cricket)
  - Sportswoman – Lydia Ko (golf)
  - Team – All Blacks (rugby)
  - Disabled Sportsperson – Sophie Pascoe (swimming)
  - Coach – Steve Hansen (rugby)
  - Emerging Talent – Eliza McCartney (athletics)

=== Cricket ===
- New Zealand, in conjunction with Australia, will host the 2015 Cricket World Cup between 14 February and 29 March.

=== Football ===
- New Zealand will host the 2015 FIFA U-20 World Cup between 30 May and 20 June.

=== Rowing ===
- New Zealand Secondary School Championships (Maadi Cup)
  - Maadi Cup (boys U18 eight) – Hamilton Boys' High School
  - Levin 75th Jubilee Cup (girls U18 eight) – St Margaret's College
  - Star Trophy (overall points) – Hamilton Boys' High School

=== Shooting ===
- Ballinger Belt – Ross Geange (Otorohanga)

== Births ==
- 12 September – Tofane, Thoroughbred racehorse
- 12 October – Verry Elleegant, Thoroughbred racehorse
- 26 October – Self Assured, Standardbred racehorse
- 3 November – Kolding, Thoroughbred racehorse

== Deaths ==
=== January ===
- 10 January – John Angus, children's rights advocate (born 1948)
- 11 January
  - Doriemus, thoroughbred racehorse (foaled 1990)
  - Chic Littlewood, television personality and actor (born 1930)
- 13 January – Tony Ciprian, television sports news presenter and producer (born 1932)
- 15 January – Harvey Sweetman, air force pilot (born 1921)
- 16 January – Sir Ian Athfield, architect (born 1940)
- 20 January – Lawrence Hogben, World War II naval officer, meteorologist (born 1916)
- 29 January – Len Wyatt, cricketer (born 1919)

=== February ===
- 1 February – Alby Duckmanton, cricket player and administrator (born 1933)
- 9 February – Apirana Mahuika, Ngāti Porou leader (born 1934)
- 11 February – Tama Huata, Māori performing arts leader (born 1950)
- 12 February – Christopher Horton, businessman (born 1938)
- 13 February – Kete Ioane, Cook Islands politician (born 1950)
- 16 February
  - Robin Duff, teacher, education leader, gay rights activist (born 1947)
  - Celia Lashlie, prison officer, social justice advocate (born 1953)
- 18 February – Doug Armstrong, cricketer, television sports presenter, politician (born 1931)
- 24 February
  - Dame Thea Muldoon, wife of Sir Robert Muldoon (born 1927)
  - Tony Small, diplomat (born 1930)

=== March ===
- 3 March –
  - Kerry Ashby, rower (born 1928)
  - Peter Yaxley, rugby league player, referee and administrator (born 1928)
- 7 March – Brian Sutton-Smith, writer and play theorist (born 1924)
- 11 March – Keith Roberts, rugby league player (born 1932)
- 12 March – Alan Wilkinson, association footballer (born 1924)
- 14 March – Graham Avery, track cyclist (born 1929)
- 18 March – Sir Don Rowlands, rower and businessman (born 1926)
- 20 March – Sir Russell Pettigrew, businessman, sports administrator (born 1920)
- 24 March
  - Bryan Bartley, engineer (born 1928)
  - Peter Stichbury, potter (born 1924)
- 27 March – Neville Denton, rugby league player (born 1934)
- 29 March – Mike Watt, sport shooter (born 1936)
- 31 March – Trevor Laurence, field hockey player (born 1952)

=== April ===
- 1 April – Sir John Ingram, engineer and businessman (born 1924)
- 2 April
  - Mick Brown, jurist (born 1937)
  - Bill Lean, Paralympic athlete (born 1941)
- 5 April – Steve Rickard, professional wrestler (born 1929)
- 10 April
  - Desmond Digby, stage designer, children's book illustrator and painter (born 1933)
  - Dorothy Jelicich, politician (born 1928)
- 16 April – Ron Bailey, politician (born 1926)
- 18 April – Bill Schultz, rugby league player (born 1938)
- 20 April – Gary Brain, timpanist and orchestral conductor (born 1943)
- 23 April – Frana Cardno, politician (born 1941)

=== May ===
- 2 May – Rex Percy, rugby league player (born 1934)
- 8 May –
  - Juan Schwanner, association football player and manager (born 1921)
  - Phil Skoglund, lawn bowls player (born 1937)
- 9 May – Buddy Corlett, softball and basketball player (born 1921)
- 10 May – Jack Body, composer (born 1944)
- 19 May – Sir Thomas Gault, jurist (born 1938)
- 21 May – Roland Avery, rugby league referee (born 1927)
- 26 May – John Pinder, comedy producer and festival director (born 1945)
- 29 May – Chris Kohlhase, softball player and coach (born 1967)
- 31 May – Iain Campbell, cricketer (born 1928)

=== June ===
- 5 June
  - Jerry Collins, rugby union player (born 1980)
  - Te Uruhina McGarvey, Tūhoe kuia (born 1927)
  - Lecretia Seales, lawyer and right to die campaigner (born 1973)
- 7 June – Peter Petherick, cricketer (born 1942)
- 9 June – Sir Peter Williams, lawyer and penal reform advocate (born 1934)
- 10 June – Bonecrusher, Thoroughbred racehorse (foaled 1982)
- 13 June – Mike Shrimpton, cricket player and coach (born 1940)
- 17 June – John Lasher, rugby league player
- 18 June – Sir Patrick Moore, otolaryngologist (born 1918)
- 20 June – Ian Bradley, naval officer and politician (born 1937)
- 22 June – Norm Berryman, rugby union player (born 1973)
- 25 June – Ross Hynds, Paralympic athlete (born 1947)
- 27 June – Eric Dunn, cricketer (born 1929)

=== July ===
- 2 July – Sir Ronald Davison, jurist, Chief Justice (1978–89) (born 1920)
- 7 July – Craig Norgate, accountant and business leader (born 1965)
- 13 July
  - Sir John Buchanan, scientist and businessman (born 1943)
  - Campbell Smith, wood engraver, playwright and poet (born 1925)
- 18 July
  - Tim Beaglehole, historian and university administrator (born 1933)
  - Lou Gardiner, military officer, Chief of Army (2006–09) (born 1952)
- 20 July – Stuart Jones, cricketer (born 1929)
- 23 July – Doug Rowe, musician and singer (born 1945)
- 27 July – Joan Mattingley, clinical chemist (born 1926)
- 29 July – Sir John Todd, businessman and philanthropist (born 1927)
- 30 July – Jimmy Edwards, rugby league player (born 1926)

=== August ===
- 4 August – Les Munro, World War II pilot, last survivor of Operation Chastise (born 1919)
- 6 August – Geoff Mardon, speedway rider (born 1927)
- 7 August – Trevor Barber, cricketer (born 1925)
- 9 August – Gordon Vette, pilot, TE-901 crash researcher (born 1933)
- 16 August – Jon Craig, architect (born c.1942)
- 17 August – George Gair, politician and diplomat (born 1926)
- 20 August – Paul Kibblewhite, pulp and paper scientist (born 1941)
- 21 August – Colin Beyer, lawyer and businessman (born 1938)
- 28 August – Jan Anderson, plant biologist
- 30 August – John Hotop, rugby union player (born 1929)

=== September ===
- 2 September
  - Avinash Deobhakta, lawyer and jurist (born 1936)
  - Manos Nathan, ceramicist (born 1948)
- 4 September – Graham Brazier, musician and songwriter (born 1952)
- 6 September – Allen Roberts, cricketer (born 1922)
- 8 September – Robert Wylie, cricketer (born 1948)
- 10 September – Colleen Waata-Urlich, ceramicist (born 1939)
- 13 September – Sir James Belich, politician, Mayor of Wellington (1986–92) (born 1927)
- 15 September – Ian Uttley, rugby union player (born 1941)
- 16 September
  - Terry McCavana, association footballer (born 1922)
  - Peter Molan, biochemist (born 1943)
  - Bill Oliver, historian and poet (born 1925)
- 17 September – Daniel Keighley, music festival promoter and band manager (born 1953)
- 20 September – Dorothy Butler, children's author, bookseller and reading advocate (born 1925)
- 25 September – Zabeel, Thoroughbred racehorse and sire (foaled 1986)
- 30 September – Neil Graham, businessman and philanthropist (born 1943)

=== October ===
- 3 October – William Taylor, children's writer and politician (born 1938)
- 5 October – Michael Dean, television presenter (born 1933)
- 6 October – Frankie Boardman, musician (born c.1933)
- 7 October – Arthur Woods, rugby union player (born 1929)
- 9 October – David Benney, applied mathematician (born 1930)
- 20 October – Sir John Scott, medical researcher (born 1931)
- 29 October – Bruce Gregory, politician (born 1937)
- 31 October – Colin Nicholson, lawyer and jurist (born 1938)

=== November ===
- 1 November – Bill Ballantine, marine biologist (born 1937)
- 10 November – Laurent Vidal, French triathlete who lived half the time in New Zealand (fiancé of Andrea Hewitt) (born 1984)
- 12 November – Peter McLeavey, art dealer (born 1936)
- 13 November – John Gray, Anglican bishop (born 1947)
- 17 November – Donald Brian, cricketer (born 1925)
- 18 November – Jonah Lomu, rugby union player (born 1975)
- 19 November
  - Rex Cunningham, rugby league player (born 1924)
  - John Hall-Jones, historian, otolaryngologist and outdoorsman (born 1927)
- 21 November – Vern Bakalich, rugby league player (born 1929)
- 30 November
  - Jack Fagan, rugby league player (born 1933)
  - David Simmons, ethnologist and historian (born 1930)

=== December ===
- 3 December – Michael Wilson, cricketer (born 1940)
- 7 December – Betty Bourke, health administrator (born 1924)
- 10 December – Maurice Graham, rugby union player (born 1931)
- 12 December – Jon Gadsby, writer and comedian (born 1953)
- 19 December – Stephen Jelicich, architect and historian (born 1923)
- 23 December – Bill Subritzky, property developer and evangelist (born 1925)

== See also ==
- 2015 in New Zealand television
- List of years in New Zealand
- Timeline of New Zealand history
- History of New Zealand
- Military history of New Zealand
- Timeline of the New Zealand environment
- Timeline of New Zealand's links with Antarctica
