= Robert Wylie =

Robert Wylie or Robert Wyllie may refer to:

- Robert Wylie (artist), American artist
- Robert Wylie (cricketer), New Zealand cricketer
- Robert Crichton Wyllie, Scottish physician and politician in the Hawaiian Kingdom
