= Doug Dillon =

New Zealand lawyer

Doug Dillon QSO

Personal details
- Born: John Douglas Dillon; 23 November 1924
- Died: 19 April 1999 (aged 74) Rotorua, New Zealand
- Education: Victoria University College
- Profession: Lawyer

John Douglas Dillon QSO (23 November 1924 – 19 April 1999) was a New Zealand lawyer and jurist.

Born on 23 November 1924, Dillon served in the Royal New Zealand Air Force during World War II, training at the Royal Canadian Air Force No.6 Service Flying Training School in Dunnville, Ontario, graduating in October 1944. The same month, he was granted a temporary commission with the rank of pilot officer, and in April 1945 he was promoted to the rank of flying officer (temporary).

After the war, Dillon studied at Victoria University College, graduating Bachelor of Laws in 1950. He worked as a solicitor in Rotorua, and was a member of both the Arbitrators' and Mediators' Institute and the Crown Solicitor's panel.

Dillon served as a High Court and Court of Appeal judge in the Cook Islands, Niue, Western Samoa and Kiribati. He owned a farm at Horohoro, near Rotorua, and was a member of the Rotorua Racing Club committee for 35 years, including a term as president.

In the 1994 New Year Honours, Dillon was appointed a Companion of the Queen's Service Order for public services. He died in Rotorua on 19 April 1999.
