= 1994 New Year Honours (New Zealand) =

Annual awards for New Zealanders

The 1994 New Year Honours in New Zealand were appointments by Elizabeth II on the advice of the New Zealand government to various orders and honours to reward and highlight good works by New Zealanders. The awards celebrated the passing of 1993 and the beginning of 1994, and were announced on 31 December 1993.

The recipients of honours are listed here as they were styled before their new honour.

== Knight Bachelor ==
- The Honourable (Mr Justice) Richard Ian Barker – of Auckland; judge of the High Court.
- The Honourable Robert McDowall (Robin) Gray MP – of Mosgiel; lately Speaker of the House of Representatives.
- John Henderson Ingram CBE – of Auckland. For services to engineering and business management.
- Timothy William Wallis – of Wānaka. For services to deer farming, export and the community.
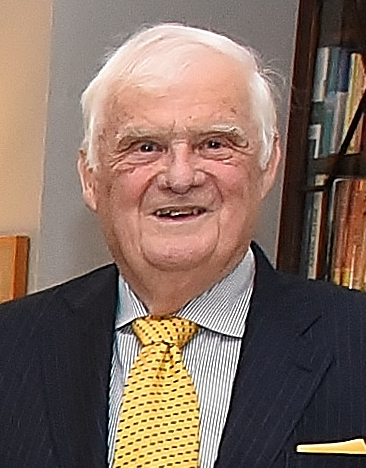
Sir Ian Barker

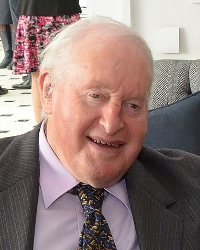
Sir Tim Wallis

== Order of the Bath ==
=== Companion (CB) ===
Military division

- Major General Anthony Leonard Birks OBE – Chief of the General Staff.

== Order of Saint Michael and Saint George ==
=== Companion (CMG) ===
- Ian Robert Cross – of Raumati South. For services to broadcasting and literature.
- Ian Lachlan Gordon Stewart – of Wellington. For services to the International Whaling Commission and diplomacy.
- Edward Te Rangihiwinui (Hiwi) Tauroa JP – of Kaeo. For public services.
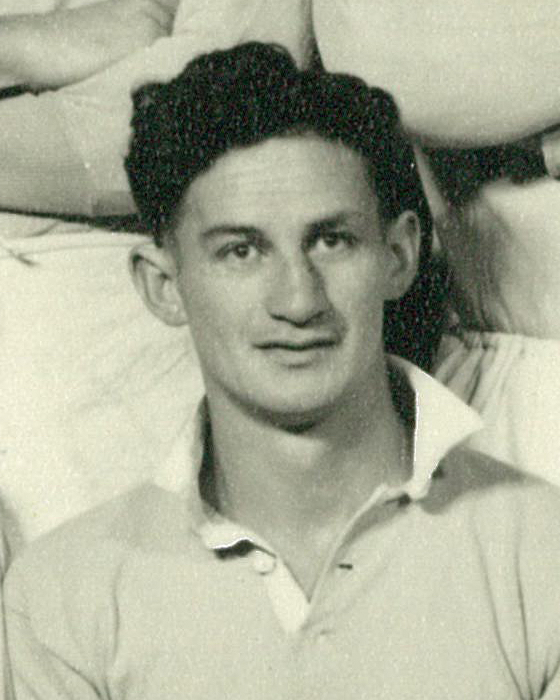
Hiwi Tauroa

== Order of the British Empire ==
=== Dame Commander (DBE) ===
Civil division

- Professor Patricia Rose Bergquist – of Auckland. For services to science.
- Eileen Rosemary Mayo (Mrs Gainsborough) – of Christchurch. For services to art.

=== Commander (CBE) ===
Civil division

- Christopher Tait Horton JP – of Auckland. For services to business management.
- Shona Graham McFarlane (Mrs Highet) MBE – of Wellington. For services to the arts.
- Judith Marjorie Potter – of Auckland. For services to the legal profession.
- Morris Bernard Roberts – of Manaia. For services to the dairy industry.
- Edward Simon Snowden DFC QSM – of Ahipara. For services to the Māori people.
- Laurence Henry Southwick QC – of Red Beach. For services to the legal profession and the community.
- Dr Donald Murray Stafford MBE – of Rotorua. For services to Māori and local history.
- Jeffrey Garfield Todd – of Auckland. For services to the accountancy profession.
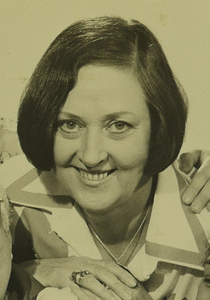
Shona McFarlane

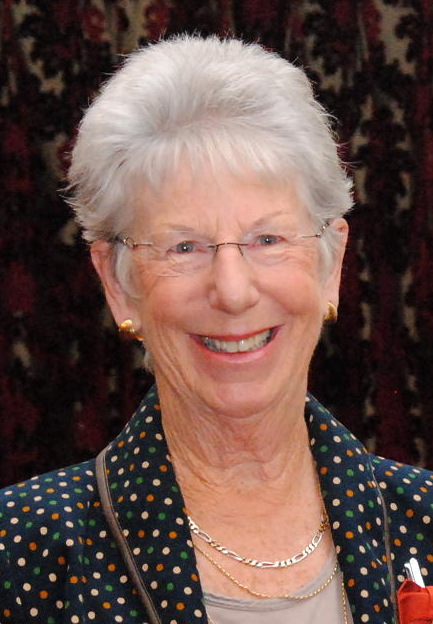
Judith Potter

=== Officer (OBE) ===
Civil division

- James John (Ian) Birch – of Auckland. For services to bowls.
- Professor Michael Hymie Cooper – of Dunedin. For services to health administration.
- Tessa Duder – of Auckland. For services to literature.
- Robert John (Rob) Guest – of Roseville, Australia. For services to entertainment.
- Bruce Ara Hosking JP – of Auckland. For services to the electric-power industry and cricket.
- Taini Maremare Jamison – of Rotorua. For services to netball.
- Pamela Adrienne Jefferies – of Auckland. For services to business management.
- (Myrlene) Dawn Jones – of Auckland. For services to netball and education.
- George Leslie Morrison JP – of Gore. For services to farming and the community.
- Michael Charles Muir – of Gisborne. For services to business management.
- James Malcolm Ott – of Christchurch. For services to the accountancy profession and the community.
- Lomond Maurice Seel – of Auckland. For services to the accountancy profession and the community.
- Alan Renfrew Simm – of Waikanae. For services to business management.
- Ian Campbell Templeton – of Wellington. For services to journalism.
- Adhurji Valabh – of Auckland. For services to the accountancy profession.
- Philip Graham Wright – Assistant Commissioner, New Zealand Police.

Military division

- Captain Richard Westwood Worth VRD – Royal New Zealand Naval Volunteer Reserve.
- Colonel Roger Charles Mortlock – Colonels' List, New Zealand Army.
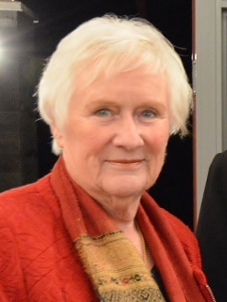
Tessa Duder

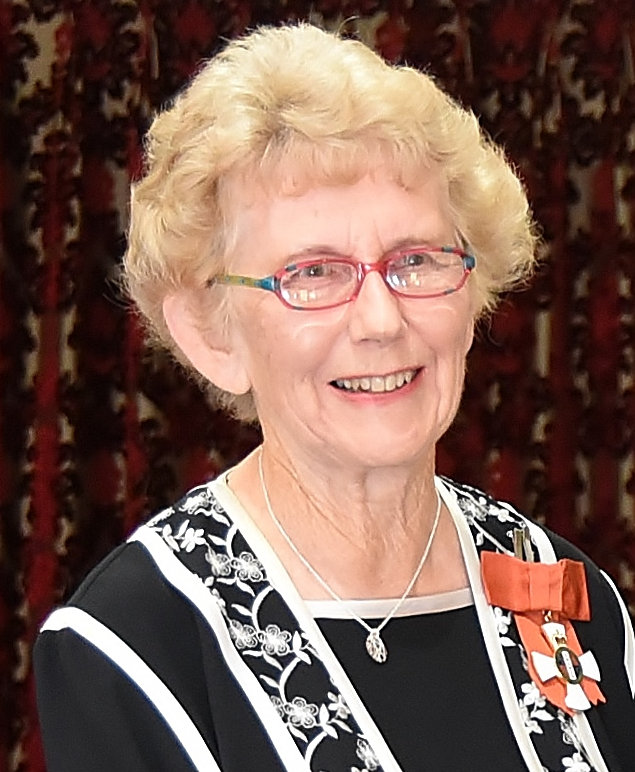
Dawn Jones

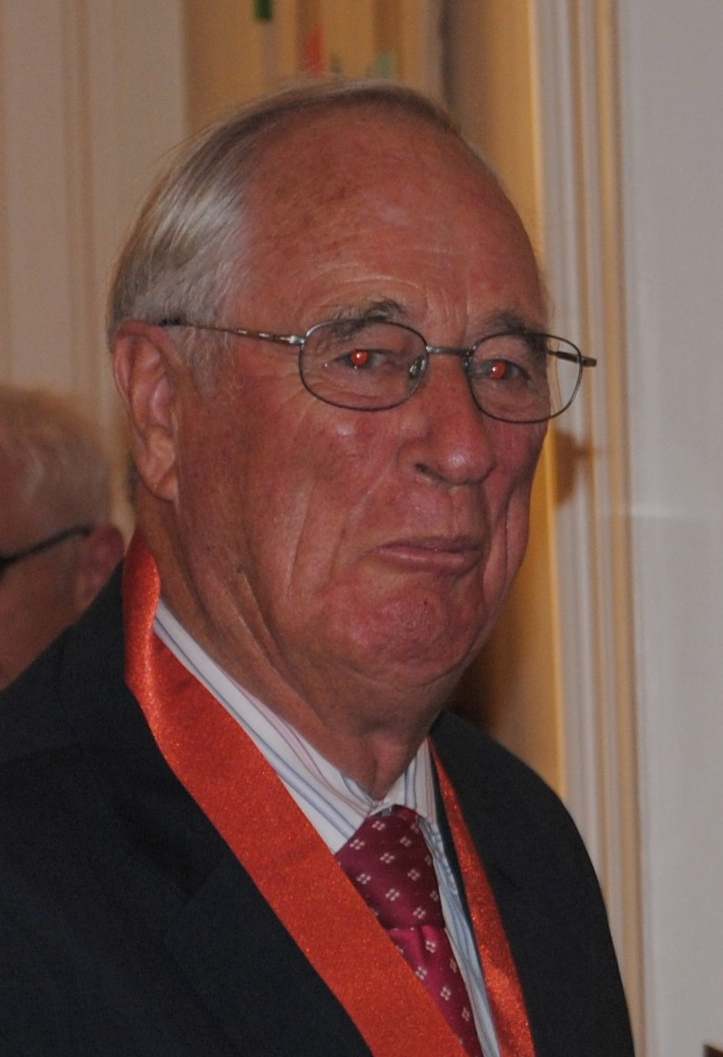
Ian Templeton

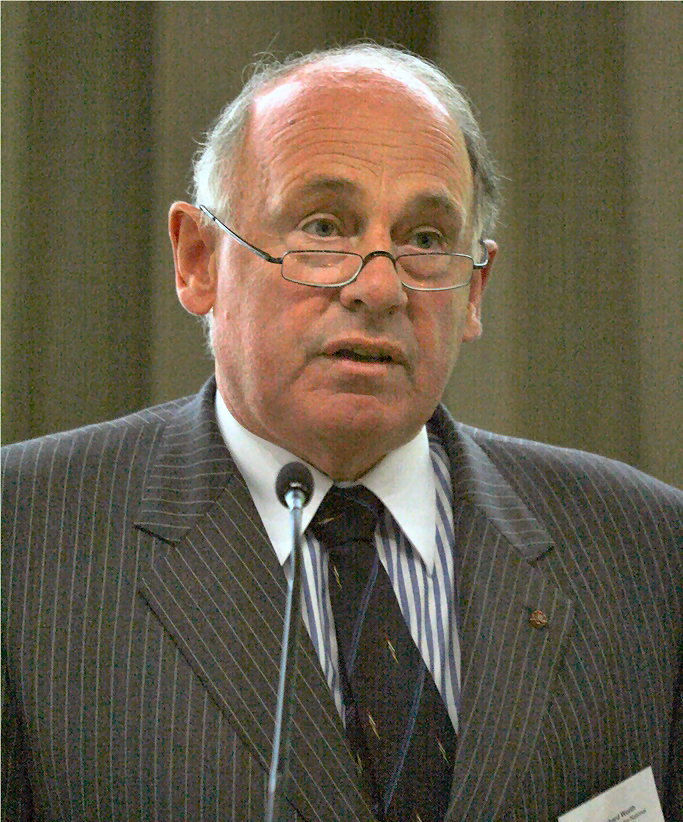
Richard Worth

=== Member (MBE) ===
Civil division

- Eunice Millicent Algar – of Matamata. For services to education and the community.
- David Annett – of Timaru. For services to export.
- William Rex Austin – of Queenstown. For services to the community.
- Dr William James Ballantine – of Warkworth. For services to marine biology and conservation.
- Terence James Brocherie JP – of Akaroa. For services to local government.
- Catherine Mary Caughey – of Auckland. For services to the community.
- Dr Patricia Rosemary Champion – of Christchurch. For services to the disabled.
- Barry John Crump – of Wānaka. For services to literature and the community.
- Graeme Edward Gordon JP – of Marton. For services to farming and the community.
- Joy Myrtle Harris – of Ashburton. For services to local-body and community affairs.
- Gerald Hamilton Hunt JP – of Motueka. For services to business development.
- Joy Kay Leslie – of Dunedin. For services to business management and the community.
- Lesley Max – of Auckland. For services to children.
- Margaret Rowe McDonald – of Tapanui. For services to the community.
- John Victor McIntyre – of Inglewood. For services to education.
- William Andrew McKerrow – of Masterton. For services to local government.
- Leslie Robert Paske JP – of Wellington. For services to local government.
- Doris Taur Pedersen – of Napier. For services to nursing and the community.
- Wendy Edith Pye – of Auckland. For services to export.
- Ian David Stockley Smith – of Auckland. For services to cricket.
- Howard Kevin Tamati – of Wellington. For services to rugby league.
- Elsie Joyce Marguerite Tillett JP – of Auckland. For services to the community.
- Holmes David Warren – of Featherston. For services to sheep breeding.
- Penelope Anne Whiting – of Auckland. For services to yachting.
- Raymond Patrick Wynne – of Taupō. For services to search and rescue operations.

Military division

- Acting Commander Gwynrydd Ardo Rees – Royal New Zealand Navy.
- Warrant Officer Class 1 Robert William Smithem – Royal New Zealand Infantry Regiment, Territorial Force (Retired).
- Flight Lieutenant James Scott Finlayson – Royal New Zealand Air Force.
- Flight Lieutenant John Leslie Dowthwaite – Royal New Zealand Air Force.
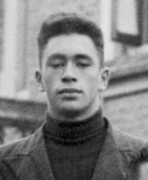
Rex Austin

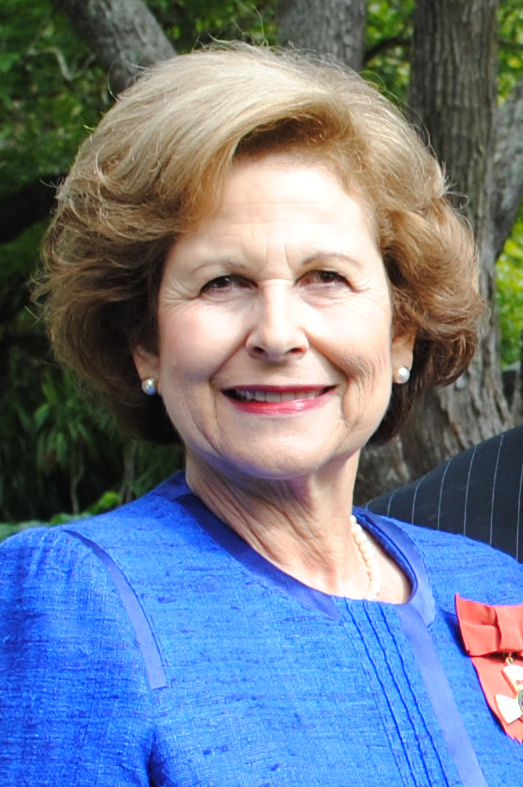
Lesley Max

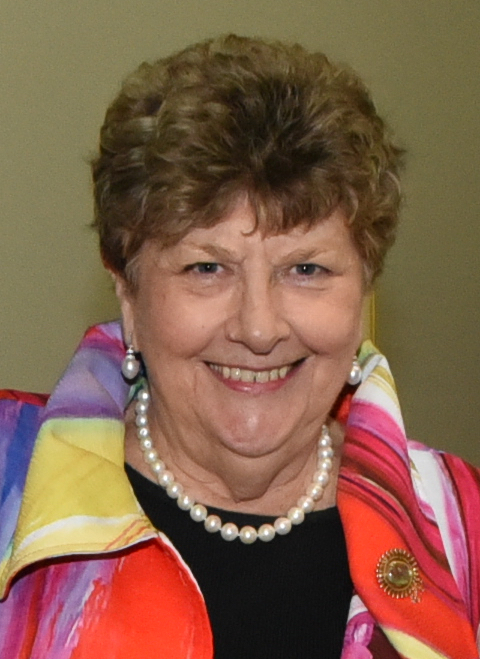
Wendy Pye

== British Empire Medal (BEM) ==
Military division

- Chief Petty Officer Peter Stuart Martin – Royal New Zealand Navy.
- Corporal Phillip John Moore – Royal New Zealand Corps of Signals.
- Corporal Todd Forrester – Royal New Zealand Corps of Signals.
- Staff Sergeant Tai Ruwhiu Paraha Hareora – Royal New Zealand Infantry Regiment.
- Sergeant Anthony George Hancock – Royal New Zealand Air Force.
- Sergeant Wayne Robin Evans – Royal New Zealand Air Force.

== Companion of the Queen's Service Order (QSO) ==
=== For community service ===
- Doris Marion Ball – of Te Kūiti.
- Dr Neville William Hogg – of Auckland.
- Monica Holland – of Christchurch.
- Whetu-Itetonga Naera JP – of Hokianga.
- John William Stott – of Christchurch.

=== For public services ===
- Shona Elizabeth Butterfield – of Wellington.
- Robert Walter Preston Cameron DFC – of Kurow.
- John Douglas Dillon – of Rotorua.
- Leonard Norbury (Bill) Downes JP – of Greymouth.
- The Honourable Anthony Peter David Friedlander – of Wellington.
- Dr Judith Moyra de Vernot McCann – of Auckland.
- The Reverend Father Patrick John O'Neill SM – of Wellington.
- Mervyn William Wisheart – of Blenheim.

== Queen's Service Medal (QSM) ==
=== For community service ===
- John Charles Anderson – of Rotorua.
- Matemoa Amy Bird – of Rotorua.
- Terence Peter Carboon – of Auckland.
- Maureen Caroline Carmichael JP – of Bulls.
- Patricia Mary Field Chapman – of Masterton.
- John Vivian Chivers – of New Plymouth.
- Vi Cottrell – of Kaiapoi.
- Audrey Martina Culley – of Kāwhia.
- Leila Beth Dalebrook – of Maungaturoto.
- John Walter da Silva – of Auckland.
- Walter John Gear – of Rotorua.
- Philip Gibbs – of Nelson.
- Gladys May Goldfinch JP – of Ohakune.
- James Alistair Grace – of Hamilton.
- Loraa Jean Habershon – of Auckland.
- Jennifer Mary Hamilton – of Christchurch.
- Alice Suisana Hunt – of Palmerston North.
- Esther Rata Jessop – of Richmond, Surrey, England.
- Harriet Clarke Johnston – of Wellington.
- Ada Tuahiwi Lau'ese – of Auckland.
- Vine Carey Martin – of Auckland.
- Neroli Annie Osborne JP – of Leeston.
- Anae Si'anaua Ostler JP – of Wellington.
- Marian Lois Owen – of Auckland.
- Marjorie Jean Rendell – of Levin.
- Patsy Evelyn Ann Riggir – of Putāruru.
- John Stuart Ruck – of Kawerau.
- Victor Vernon George Shaw – of Orewa.
- Ada Sullivan – of Timaru.
- Te Ataihaia Hera Tautari – of Hamilton.
- James Henry Taylor – of Picton.
- Rosemarie Julia Toal – of Greymouth.
- Eric Ross Warner – of Hamilton.
- Dulcie Olivia Watson – of Methven.
- Lieutenant Colonel Moira Althea Wright – of Wellington.

=== For public services ===
- Muriel Abraham – of New Plymouth.
- Florence Mary Annison – of Russell.
- Brian Allan Barrett – of Oxford.
- Wesley Elm Bowater – of Levin.
- Rangiuira Briggs JP – of Rotorua.
- George Alfred Brown – senior constable, New Zealand Police.
- Christine McKelvie Cole Catley – of Picton.
- Kathleen June Dampney – of Kaitaia.
- Noel Vernon Darvill – of Auckland.
- Malcolm Blair Dickie JP – of Mount Maunganui.
- Iris Alma Egerton – of Invercargill.
- Margaret Florence Gordon – of Porirua.
- Shirley Pauline Harris – of Porirua.
- Ronald James Hibbs – senior constable, New Zealand Police.
- Margaret Helen Hoessly – of Auckland.
- John Christopher Horne – of Wellington.
- Peter Raymond King – of Northland.
- Donald Milson Linklater JP – of Feilding.
- Bryan Malcom McMahon JP – of Whitianga.
- Norman Caithness McPherson JP – of Christchurch.
- Walter James Milne – of Wyndham.
- Graham Johnson Mountjoy JP – of Auckland.
- Michael Roderick Murchison – of Darfield.
- Frederick John Hunt Parker JP – of Te Kūiti.
- Mervyn Wilfred Parker – of Paeroa.
- Nancy Jane Pattison – of Taumarunui.
- Helen Margaret Pulman JP – of Pukekohe.
- Elsie Joyce Russell – of Te Awamutu.
- Peter Henry Joseph Sellers – of Dunedin.
- Colleen Thelma Twin – of Nelson.
- Stella Wadsworth – of Wairau Valley.
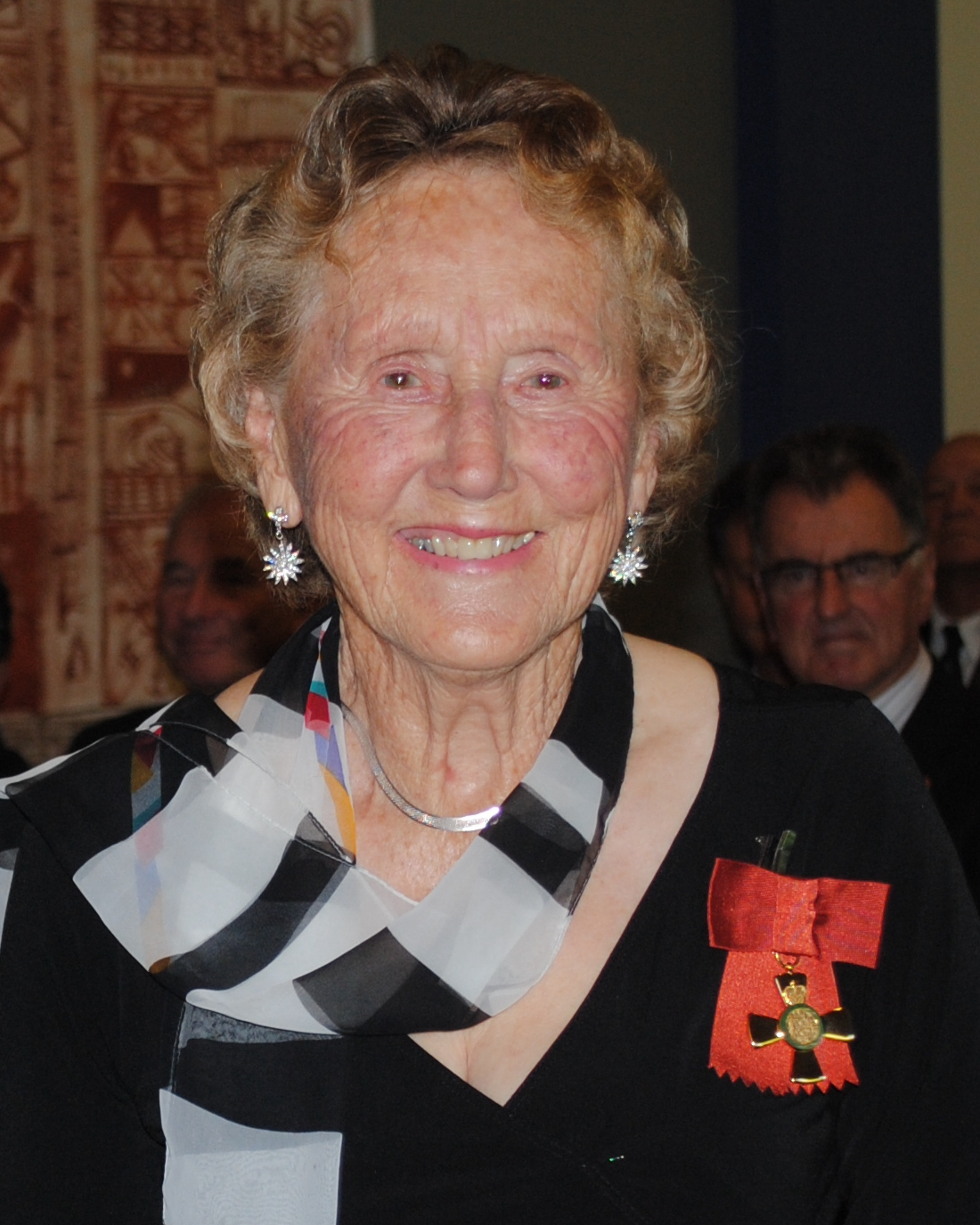
Florence Annison

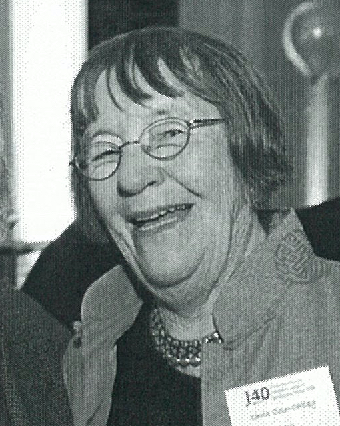
Christine Cole Catley

== Queen's Fire Service Medal (QFSM) ==
- William Alan Apes QSM – chief fire officer, Lake Tekapo Volunteer Fire Brigade, New Zealand Fire Service.
- John Joseph Cranch – chief fire officer, Tīrau Volunteer Fire Brigade, New Zealand Fire Service.
- Gordon Arthur Irvine – chief fire officer, Geraldine Volunteer Fire Brigade, New Zealand Fire Service.

== Queen's Police Medal (QPM) ==
- Alafia Toloa – detective senior sergeant, New Zealand Police.
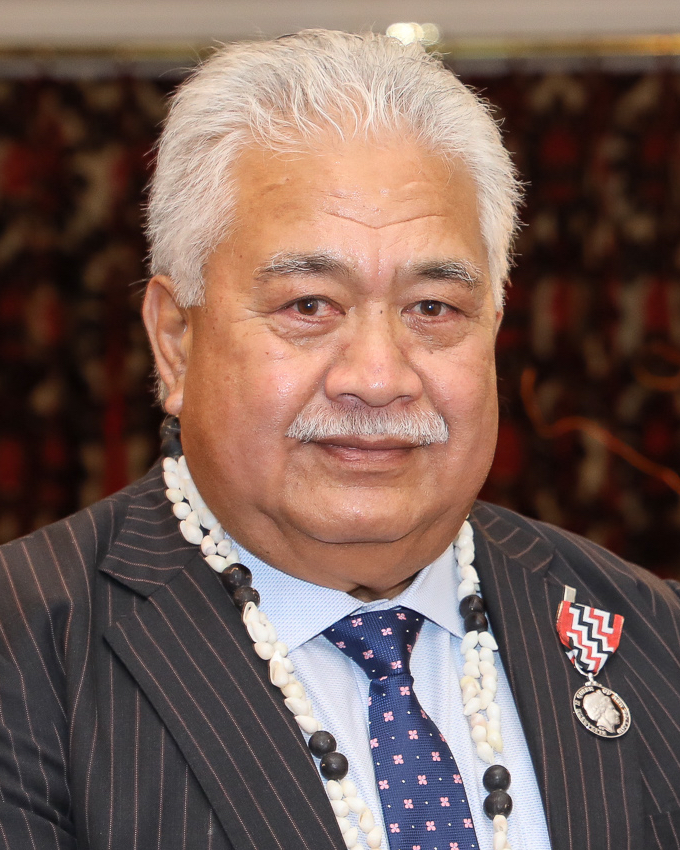
Luther Toloa

== Air Force Cross (AFC) ==
- Squadron Leader Brian Leslie Coulter – Royal New Zealand Air Force.

== Air Force Medal (AFM) ==
- Flight Sergeant Richard John Hardeman – Royal New Zealand Air Force.

== Queen's Commendation for Valuable Service in the Air ==
- Squadron Leader Neil David Kenny – Royal New Zealand Air Force.
