= 1984 New Year Honours (New Zealand) =

Annual awards for New Zealanders

The 1984 New Year Honours in New Zealand were appointments by Elizabeth II on the advice of the New Zealand government to various orders and honours to reward and highlight good works by New Zealanders. The awards celebrated the passing of 1983 and the beginning of 1984, and were announced on 31 December 1983.

The recipients of honours are displayed here as they were styled before their new honour.

== Knight Bachelor ==
- Charles Erskine Bowmar QSO – of Gore. For services to local government and the community.
- The Honourable Mr Justice John Barry O'Regan – of Wellington; judge of the High Court.
- Lewis Nathan Ross CMG – of Auckland; chairman, Bank of New Zealand.
- John Samuel Thorn OBE JP – of Port Chalmers. For services to local government and the community.

== Order of Saint Michael and Saint George ==
=== Knight Grand Cross (GCMG) ===
- The Right Honourable Robert David Muldoon CH MP – of Wellington; Prime Minister of New Zealand.
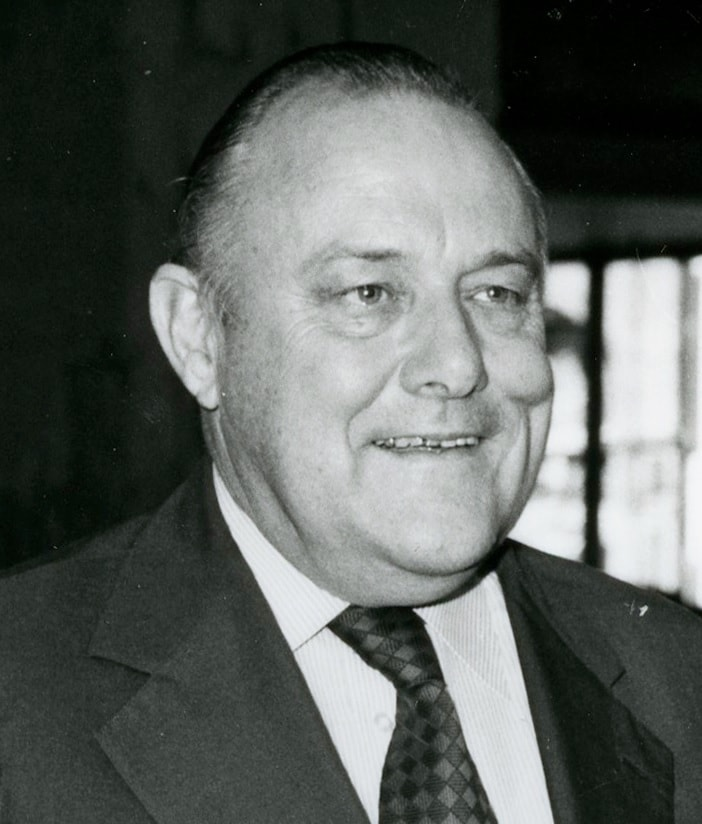
Sir Robert Muldoon

=== Companion (CMG) ===
- Norman Basil Fippard MBE JP – of Hastings. For public and community service.
- Judge Arnold Reay Turner – of Auckland. For services to local government and the community.

== Order of the British Empire ==
=== Knight Commander (KBE) ===
Civil division

- William Douglas Leuchars MBE ED – of Wellington; president, New Zealand Returned Services Association.
- The Honourable Robert Richmond Rex CMG OBE – Premier of Niue.

=== Commander (CBE) ===
Civil division

- Whitford James Brown OBE – of Porirua. For services to the City of Porirua.
- Valmai Clare Foster – of Wellington. For services to the Save the Children Fund.
- John Henderson Ingram – of Auckland. For services to manufacturing and engineering profession.
- Richard Harlau Kerr – of Timaru. For services to the New Zealand Hospital Boards Association and the community.
- Amy Talbot – of Timaru. For services to the Women's Division, Federated Farmers' of New Zealand.
- Gerald Pilkington Ward – of Christchurch. For services to the fruit-growing industry.

Military division

- Commodore Douglas Brian Domett ADC – Royal New Zealand Navy.
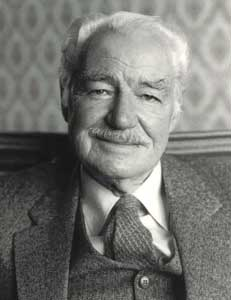
Whitford Brown

=== Officer (OBE) ===
Civil division

- Gary Clifford Brain – of Wellington. For services to music.
- George Te-Otinga Hori Brennan – of Christchurch. For services to the Māori people.
- James William Brodie FRSNZ – of Wellington. For services to oceanography.
- Caroline Branen Cartwright JP – of Christchurch. For services to the community.
- Claud Geoffrey Rowden Chavasse – of Rotorua. For services to forestry, conservation and the community.
- Professor Robin Hamley Clark – of Auckland; lately professor of geology, Victoria University of Wellington.
- Harold Morley Denton – of Auckland. For services to education and tourism.
- Jack Denis Laird – of Richmond. For services to pottery.
- Keith Duncan Macartney – of Stratford. For services to the dairy industry and the community.
- Gerald Ian Crichton McDouall JP – of Wanganui. For services to the New Zealand Red Cross Society and the community.
- Harold Thomas Mahon – of Hamilton. For services to rowing.
- Dr Ronald Bruce Miller – of Wellington; lately chief director, Department of Scientific and Industrial Research.
- Lois Joan Muir – of Dunedin. For services to netball.
- Maui Ormond Woodbine Pomare JP – of Plimmerton. For services to the Māori people and the community.
- Stephen Alexander Rusbatch – deputy assistant commissioner, New Zealand Police.
- Ross William Southcombe – of Surrey, England. For services to export.
- Stanley Lake Young – of Upper Hutt; chief traffic superintendent, Ministry of Transport.

Military division

- Commander Robert John Eckford – Royal New Zealand Navy.
- Colonel William Charles Nathan ED – Colonels' List (Territorial Force).
- Group Captain Mervyn William Hodge AFC – Royal New Zealand Air Force.
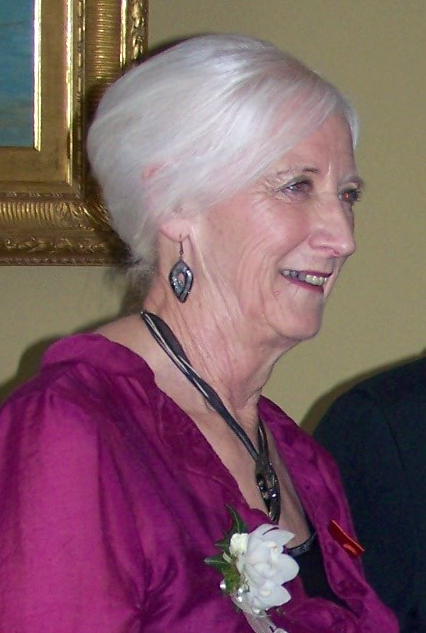
Lois Muir

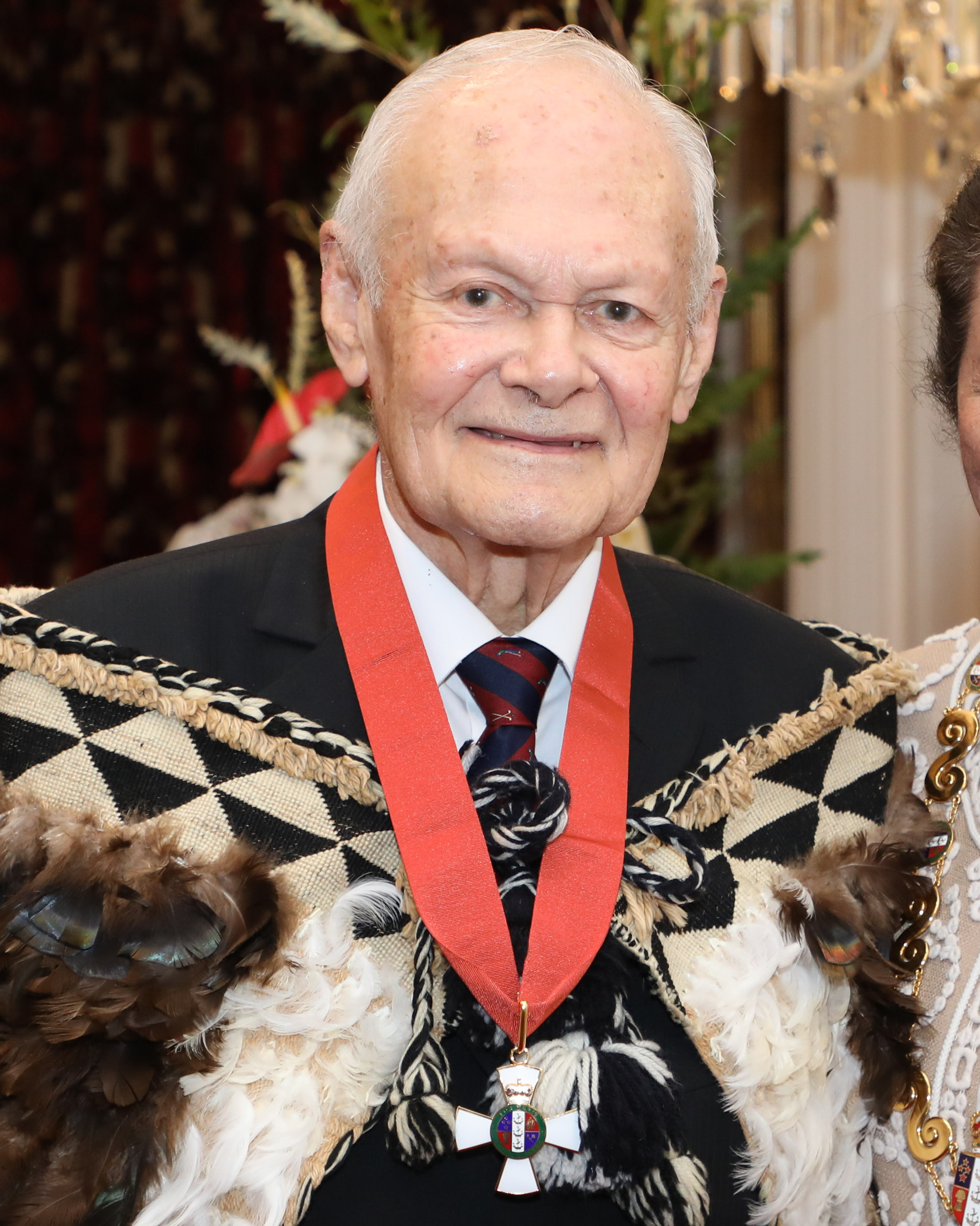
Bill Nathan

=== Member (MBE) ===
Civil division

- Harry Botham JP – of Wellington. For services to music.
- Osmond Elgar Clayton – of Rotorua. For services to brass bands.
- Morrin Thomas Cooper JP – of Auckland. For services to local government and community affairs.
- Arthur Blair Cowan JP – of Ōtorohanga. For services to conservation.
- Owen Maxwell Curtis – of Nelson. For services to search and rescue operations and the community.
- William John Funnell – of Taupō. For services to search and rescue operations.
- Richard William James Harrington – of Christchurch. For services to local government and community affairs.
- Hine-Nui-Te-Po (Judith) Haumaha – of Hamilton. For services to the Māori people.
- Rose Hilary Adams Haylock – of Bulls. For services to the girl guide movement and the community.
- Eric Charles Hiscock – of Opua. For services to ocean sailing.
- Susan Oakes Hiscock – of Opua. For services to ocean sailing.
- Alfred Reginald Bellingham Kingsford JP – of Stoke. For services to the community.
- Lawrence Fredrick Luxton – of Christchurch. For services to the New Zealand Navy League and the community.
- Eric Arthur Morgon – of Bethesda, Maryland, United States; lately assistant director, Government Communications Security Bureau, Ministry of Defence.
- Charles Allan Morse JP – of Dargaville. For services to the community.
- Constance Olivette Nicholson – of Te Awamutu. For services to music.
- William Mack Nicol – of Auckland. For services to the kiwifruit industry.
- Lynette Kay Parker – of Hamilton. For services to netball.
- The Reverend Father John Newport Pound – of Waikiwi. For services to the community.
- Janet Roberts – of Hamilton. For services to the Women's Division, Federated Farmers of New Zealand.
- Dr Robert Duncan Scott – of Christchurch; lately senior casualty officer, Accident and Emergency Department, North Canterbury Hospital Board.
- Peter Gray Scoular – of Christchurch. For services to the engineering profession. (Note: Deceased 30 December 1983. Her Majesty's approval of this appointment was signified prior to the date of decease.)
- Glyn Lawrence Tucker – of Auckland. For services to Thoroughbred racing.
- Robert Edward Walton JP – of Dunedin. For welfare and community service.

Military division

- Warrant Officer Yeoman of Signals Bernard Hill – Royal New Zealand Navy.
- Warrant Officer Class I Terence Neale Archer – Royal New Zealand Engineers.
- Temporary Warrant Officer Class I Kevin Herewini – New Zealand Special Air Service.
- Major Edwin Grant Steel DFC – Royal New Zealand Infantry Regiment.
- Major Brian Arthur Stewart – Royal New Zealand Engineers.
- Squadron Leader Peter James Garnett – Royal New Zealand Air Force.

== British Empire Medal (BEM) ==
Military division

- Chief Petty Officer Administration Alan Francis Goding – Royal New Zealand Naval Volunteer Reserve.
- Chief Petty Officer Radio Electrical Mechanician William John McAlpine – Royal New Zealand Navy.
- Chief Petty Officer Physical Training Instructor Garry Pettis – Royal New Zealand Navy.
- Staff Sergeant Michael William Pennington – Royal New Zealand Electrical and Mechanical Engineers (Territorial Force).
- Staff Sergeant Victor Kawana Timu – New Zealand Special Air Service.
- Flight Sergeant Edmund John Russell – Royal New Zealand Air Force.

== Companion of the Queen's Service Order (QSO) ==
=== For community service ===
- Eileen Winifred Haar – of Wanganui.
- Bernard Hollard – of Kaponga.
- Ian William Jenkin – of Lower Hutt.
- Murray Alister McRae – of Christchurch.
- Mollie Campbell Natusch – of Hastings.

=== For public services ===
- Catherine Edna Armstrong – of Taupō.
- Desmond Walter Rutherford Bell – of Kaitaia.
- James Thomas Brockliss – of Rawene.
- Edward Meldrum Eliott JP – of Whangārei.
- Dr Raymond Robert Forster FRSNZ – of Dunedin; director of the Otago Museum.
- John Young Pethig JP – of Christchurch.
- Graham Douglas Pringle – of Lower Hutt; lately general manager, State Insurance Office.
- Dr Antony Walter Reeve – of Havelock North.
- Lou Hunaara Tangaere JP – of Tikitiki.
- Dr William James Watt – of Rotorua.

== Queen's Service Medal (QSM) ==
=== For community service ===
- John William Ackroyd-Kelly JP – of Wellington.
- Brien John Bennett – of New Plymouth.
- Keith Raymond Cairns – of Masterton.
- Kenneth George Daniell – of Taradale.
- Lyndsay John Fahey – of Kew, Victoria, Australia.
- Colin Purcell Finnerty – of Kaikohe.
- Eric John Hancock – of Te Aroha.
- Raymond Kenneth Hyams – of Auckland.
- Charles William Ireland – of Te Karaka.
- Errol Graham Mason – of Auckland.
- Katerina Maxwell – of Ōpōtiki.
- Lillian Edith Mills JP – of Wairoa.
- John Collinson Nesfield – of Auckland.
- Merekaraka Te Ra Matekino Ngarimu – of Ruatoria.
- Norma Stuart Nisbet – of Otautau.
- Manaseli Pamatatau – of Auckland.
- Peter Graham Stokes – of Wellington.
- Dulcie Doreen Sutherland JP – of Mosgiel.
- George Hamilton Ward – of Auckland.

=== For public services ===
- Margaret Mate-Kitawhiti Carr JP – of Hāwera.
- Dr Leslie Charles Carter – of Wairoa.
- Brian Fabish JP – of Inglewood.
- Mary Jean Grant – of Rotorua.
- Isla Noeline Greenstreet – of Leigh; public health nurse, Warkworth.
- Marguerita Ray Hoffey – of Auckland.
- Bob Johnston – of Rakaia.
- Maureen King JP – of Auckland.
- George Angus McGregor – of Te Anau.
- Desmond James Stancliffe Ogle – of Whangārei; lately officer in charge, Aupouri Forest, New Zealand Forest Service.
- Moanaroa Raureti – of Hamilton; lately district community officer, Department of Māori Affairs, Hamilton.
- Rhea Triance Shroff – of Orewa.
- Edwina Anita Thompson – of Temuka.
- Ewart Ross Tyson – lately sergeant, New Zealand Police.

== Royal Red Cross ==
=== Associate (ARRC) ===
- Major Daphne Margaret Shaw – Royal New Zealand Nursing Corps.

== Air Force Cross (AFC) ==
- Flight Lieutenant Richard James Newlands – Royal New Zealand Air Force.

== Queen's Fire Services Medal (QFSM) ==
- Peter George Ide – deputy chief fire officer, Invercargill Fire Brigade, New Zealand Fire Service.
- Derek John Pitcaithly – district officer, New Brighton Volunteer Fire Brigade, New Zealand Fire Service.
- Ronald Albert Taylor – station officer, Upper Hutt Fire Brigade, New Zealand Fire Service.

== Queen's Police Medal (QPM) ==
- Alan Charles William Lambert – superintendent, New Zealand Police.
- Colin Gordon Whitefield – constable, New Zealand Police.

== Queen's Commendation for Valuable Service in the Air ==
- Lieutenant John Noel Grant – Royal New Zealand Navy.
- Flight Lieutenant Colin Frank Pearce – Royal New Zealand Air Force.
