= Eric and Susan Hiscock =

Eric Hiscock MBE
- Born: Eric Charles Hiscock; 14 March 1908
- Died: 15 September 1986 (aged 78); Vanderer V, Whangārei, New Zealand
- Occupations: Sailor; author
- Spouse: Susan Oakes Sclater (m. 1941)

Susan Hiscock MBE
- Born: Susan Oakes Sclater; 18 May 1913
- Died: 12 May 1995 (aged 81); Yarmouth, Isle of Wight, England
- Occupation: Sailor
- Spouse: Eric Charles Hiscock (m. 1941; died 1986)

Eric Charles Hiscock MBE (14 March 1908 – 15 September 1986) was a British sailor and author of books on small boat sailing and ocean cruising. Together with his wife and crew Susan Oakes Hiscock MBE (née Sclater; 18 May 1913 – 12 May 1995), he authored numerous accounts of their short cruises and world circumnavigations, accomplished over several decades. His works also include several technical how-to books on sailing and ocean cruising and a film made on board Wanderer III entitled Beyond The West Horizon.

== Early life ==
Eric Hiscock chronicled his earliest sailing experiences, both solo and later with his wife Susan, in Wandering Under Sail (first published 1939, revised and enlarged 1948 and 1977). This book primarily contains accounts of his early sailing days on his sailing boats Wanderer and Wanderer II from England to Ireland and Scotland, and on two other small sailing boats, Dyarchy and Tern II. The 1977 edition includes the story of the Hiscocks' first ocean voyage, a prelude to their later and longer world cruises on subsequent sailboats, all named Wanderer.

== Cruises on Wanderer III and beyond ==
The account of the Hiscocks' first world circumnavigation (1952–1955) was told in Around the World in Wanderer III (originally published in 1956). Wanderer III, a 30-foot (9.1 m) Laurent Giles sloop, carried the couple around the world via the tropics at a time when few people were cruising the world for pleasure on small sailing boats. The voyage, the first of their three circumnavigations, and book accorded them a degree of popular celebrity. The book was also the start of a series detailing their later voyages on their sailing boats Wanderer III, Wanderer IV and Wanderer V. The trips in Wanderer III, together with previous voyages, provided much technical information for Eric Hiscock's technical how-to volumes on small-boat sailing and ocean cruising, Cruising Under Sail and Voyaging Under Sail (later combined and published as Cruising Under Sail).

== Honours and awards ==
Eric and Susan Hiscock were awarded the Bluewater Medal by the Cruising Club of America in 1955 for a "Circumnavigation by Canal and Cape of Good Hope by owner and wife, July 24, 1952 – July 13, 1955 in 30 feet (9.1 m) Giles-designed cutter." The Bluewater Medal recognizes "meritorious seamanship and adventure upon the sea displayed by amateur sailors of all nationalities, that might otherwise go unrecognized". The Hiscocks were members or the Royal Cruising Club, of which Eric was Vice-Commodore from 1959 to 1963, and they received numerous awards. They jointly received the Sir Lennon Goldsmith Exploration Award in 1973, and the RCC Medal for services to cruising in 1975. Susan twice won the Ladies' Cup.

The Hiscocks were both appointed Members of the Order of the British Empire in the 1984 New Year Honours, for services to yachting.

== Rockall ==
The second landing of 1988 on Rockall was the Nature Conservancy Council landing from FPV Noma. Sue Hiscock at this point became the first female to land on Rockall. Christine Howson in the same expedition became the second female to land on Rockall. Eric also landed as part of this expedition.

== Deaths ==
Eric Hiscock died on board Wanderer V in Whangārei, New Zealand, in 1986. Susan Hiscock died in Yarmouth, Isle of Wight, in 1995.
