= Michael Cooper (economist) =

British economist in New Zealand (1938–2017)

Michael Cooper OBE
- Born: Michael Hymie Kupferroth; 15 December 1938; Lowestoft, Suffolk, England
- Died: 15 July 2017 (aged 78); Martinborough, New Zealand
- Occupation: Economist

Michael Hymie Cooper OBE (né Kupferroth, 15 December 1938 – 15 July 2017) was a British-born economist and one of the first to develop the field of health economics in the 1960s. He later moved to the University of Otago in New Zealand.

== Biography ==
Cooper took a position as senior chair in economics at the University of Otago in 1976, where he established the university's first health economics class. He worked at the university for 18 years, becoming pro vice-chancellor. He chaired the Otago Area Health Board. In 1990 he was awarded the New Zealand 1990 Commemoration Medal, and in the 1994 New Year Honours, he was appointed an Officer of the Order of the British Empire for services to health administration.

He died on 15 July 2017 at his home in Martinborough.

== Selected publications ==
- The Price of Blood. The Institute of Economic Affairs, 1968
- Rationing Health Care. Croom Helm, 1975
