= Jim Brodie (geologist) =

New Zealand geologist, oceanographer, historian and philatelist

Jim Brodie OBE
- Born: James William Brodie; 7 October 1920; Bebington, Cheshire, England
- Died: 11 April 2009 (aged 88)
- Education: Napier Boys' High School; Victoria University College
- Spouse: Audrey Jacobsen (m. 1945)
- Children: 2
- Scientific career
- Fields: Geology
- Workplaces: DSIR

James William Brodie OBE (7 October 1920 – 11 April 2009) was a New Zealand geologist, oceanographer and amateur historian and philatelist.

== Biography ==
Born in Bebington, Cheshire, England, on 7 October 1920, Brodie was the son of Isabella Brodie and James T. F. Brodie. After the family migrated to New Zealand, Brodie was educated at Napier Boys' High School, where he witnessed the Napier earthquake and was inspired to become a geologist. He joined the Lands and Survey Department in 1937, moving to the DSIR in 1945. In 1949 he received his MSc in geology from Victoria University College. He was a founding staff member of the Oceanographic Institute in 1954 and led it from 1958 until 1977.

After retirement he was on the board of trustees of the National Art Gallery and National Museum and served on the project that transformed them into Te Papa. He also contributed several biographies to the Dictionary of New Zealand Biography and was a mainstay of the Karori Historical Society.

== Honours and awards ==
In 1974, Brodie was elected a Fellow of the Royal Society of New Zealand. In the 1984 New Year Honours, he was appointed an Officer of the Order of the British Empire, for services to oceanography.

== Books ==
=== General ===
- Bathymetry of the New Zealand Region. 1964.
- First seven thousand: A jubilee history of Scots College, 1916-1990. Board of Governors of Scots College, 1991.
- Karori gold-rush, 1869-1873. Karori Historical Society, 1997.
- Keeping track : Quakers in nineteenth century New Zealand. Published for New Zealand Yearly Meeting of the Society of Friends by the Beechtree Press, 1999. (With Audrey Brodie)
- Krakatoa: a selected natural history bibliography. New Zealand Oceanographic Institute, DSIR, 1982. (With Audrey Brodie, K. Kusumadinata)
- Note on tidal circulation in Port Nicholson, New Zealand. New Zealand Oceanographic Institute, 195?
- Sediments of the western shelf, North Island, New Zealand. Wellington, N.Z.: New Zealand Dept. of Scientific and Industrial Research, 1967. (With J.C. McDougall)
- Seeking a new land: Quakers in New Zealand: a volume of biographical sketches. Published for New Zealand Yearly Meeting of the Society of Friends by the Beechtree Press, 1993. (With Audrey Brodie)
- Submarine geology of Milford Sound. New Zealand: 1955. (With Anton Fr. Bruun and C.A. Fleming)
- Terawhiti and the goldfields. Karori Historical Society, 1986.
- View of the bay: its inhabitants seen through the eyes of the 53-year-old Lucy Violet Holdsworth, the newly-wed wife of John Holdsworth of 'Swarthmoor' in Havelock North: from her journal. Published for New Zealand Yearly Meeting of the Society of Friends by Beechtree Press, 2000. (With Audrey Brodie)

=== Philatelic ===
- History of Government Life postage stamps. New Zealand Government Life Insurance Corporation and Royal Philatelic Society of New Zealand, 1988.
- New Zealand railway and revenue stamps. Royal Philatelic Society of New Zealand, 1979.
- New Zealand railway charges stamps: design and printing. Royal Philatelic Society of New Zealand, 1983.
