= Peter Sellers (broadcaster) =

New Zealand sports broadcaster

Peter Sellers QSM
- Born: Peter Heayne Joseph Sellers; 9 June 1921; Lyall Bay, Wellington, New Zealand
- Died: 23 April 2016 (aged 94); Dunedin, New Zealand
- Education: Rongotai College
- Occupation: Sports broadcaster
- Years active: 1952–1987

Peter Heayne Joseph Sellers QSM (9 June 1921 – 22 April 2016) was a New Zealand sports broadcaster.

== Early life ==
Born in the Wellington suburb of Lyall Bay, Sellers was educated at Rongotai College.

== Broadcasting career ==
Sellers began working for the New Zealand Broadcasting Service (which later became the New Zealand Broadcasting Corporation) in Wellington in 1952, and moved to Dunedin in 1958. He became one of the country's leading sports broadcasters, retiring in 1987. While best known as a radio broadcaster, Sellers also presented a television sports show from the early 1960s until 1975.

== Later life and death ==
In the 1994 New Year Honours, Sellers was awarded the Queen's Service Medal for public services. He died in Dunedin on 22 April 2016.
