= Christopher Horton (businessman) =

New Zealand company director and sharebroker

Christopher Tait Horton CBE JP (11 November 1938 – 12 February 2015) was a New Zealand company director and sharebroker.

Born in Auckland in 1938 and educated at King's College, Horton was the son of Sheila Marie (née Figgis) and Ian Chisholm Horton, and he was a great-grandson of newspaper proprietor Alfred Horton. He was a second cousin of newspaper publisher and philanthropist Michael Horton.

Horton served as chair of the Fishing Industry Board, and was appointed a Commander of the Order of the British Empire, for services to business management, in the 1994 New Year Honours. He died at Ruakaka in 2015, aged 76.
