= John Ingram (engineer) =

New Zealand engineer and businessman (1924–2015)

Sir John Ingram CBE
- Born: John Henderson Ingram; 3 September 1924; Nelson, New Zealand
- Died: 1 April 2015 (aged 90); Auckland, New Zealand
- Education: Nelson College
- Alma mater: Canterbury University College
- Occupations: Engineer; businessman
- Spouse: Rosemary Clara Cuningham (m. 1952)
- Children: 3

Sir John Henderson Ingram CBE (3 September 1924 – 1 April 2015) was a New Zealand engineer and businessman. He was managing director of New Zealand Steel from 1969 to 1987, and later served as a member of the Waitangi Tribunal.

== Early life and family ==
Ingram was born in Nelson on 3 September 1924, and was educated at Nelson College from 1935 to 1942. In November 1942, he was called up for service with the armed forces, and he served as flight mechanic in the Royal New Zealand Air Force, attaining the rank of leading aircraftsman.

Following World War II, Ingram received a bursary to study at Canterbury University College, from where he graduated with a Bachelor of Engineering degree in mechanical engineering in 1950. In 1948, he won the New Zealand university heavyweight boxing title, and the following year he was awarded a boxing blue by Canterbury University College.

In 1952, Ingram married Rosemary Clara Cuningham, who had also attended Canterbury University College and graduated with a Bachelor of Arts degree in 1949. The couple would go on to have three children.

== Engineering and business career ==
After graduating, Ingram began his engineering career with the Ministry of Works as a project mechanical engineer on the Roxburgh hydro scheme from 1950 to 1952. In 1952, Ingram and his family moved to Melbourne, Australia, where he worked for engineers Boving and Company, and rose to become managing director in 1954. He returned to New Zealand in 1962 to take up the role of chief engineer at Cable Price Corporation, and three months later he became to company's managing director.

Ingram remained at Cable Price until 1969, when he was appointed general manager and, not long after, managing director of the newly operational New Zealand Steel, remaining there until retiring in 1987.

From 1976 to 1977, Ingram served as president of the Institution of Professional Engineers New Zealand. He was active as a director of numerous companies including Pacific Steel, McDonald's Lime, Feltex and the National Bank of New Zealand, and chairman of Bridon New Zealand and Auckland Uniservices.

Ingram was as a member of the University of Auckland council for 18 years from 1979, including a period as pro-chancellor from 1982 to 1983.

== Later life and death ==
Following his retirement, Ingram remained active in community organisations and public life. He was president of the Auckland Manufacturers' Association from 1989 to 1991, a trustee of World Wildlife Fund, the Antarctic Heritage Trust, and the MOTAT Trust, and a council member of the Auckland Institute and Museum. In 1993, he was appointed a member of the Waitangi Tribunal, serving until 1998. He also served as a member of the Auckland Area Health Board.

Ingram died in Auckland on 1 April 2015, aged 90. His wife, Rosemary, Lady Ingram, died in Auckland less than a year later, on 29 February 2016.

== Honours and awards ==
In the 1984 New Year Honours, Ingram was appointed a Commander of the Order of the British Empire, for services to manufacturing and the engineering profession. In 1990, he was awarded the New Zealand 1990 Commemoration Medal, and in the 1994 New Year Honours he was appointed a Knight Bachelor, for services to engineering and business management.

Ingram was elected a Distinguished Fellow of the Institution of Professional Engineers New Zealand in 1997. He was also a Distinguished Fellow of the Institute of Directors in New Zealand, a Fellow of the Institution of Mechanical Engineers and a Fellow of the Australasian Institute of Mining and Metallurgy.
