= Michael Wilson (cricketer) =

New Zealand cricketer

Personal information
- Born: 27 March 1940; Blenheim, New Zealand
- Died: 3 December 2015 (aged 75); Blenheim, New Zealand
- Source: ESPNcricinfo, 28 June 2016

Michael Wilson (27 March 1940 – 3 December 2015) was a New Zealand cricketer. He played one first-class match for Central Districts in 1959/60.
