= Trevor Laurence =

New Zealand field hockey player

Trevor James Laurence (born 11 June 1952 in Te Aroha, died 31 March 2015 in Paekākāriki) was a New Zealand field hockey player. He competed in the 1984 Summer Olympics in Los Angeles, with the national team, the Black Sticks, which finished seventh.

== Work ==
Founder and Owner of Experiential Training and Coaching (ETC)
