= Gary Brain =

Gary Brain OBE
- Born: Gary Clifford Dennis Brain; 12 August 1943; Palmerston North, New Zealand
- Died: 20 April 2015 (aged 71) Paris, France
- Genre: Classical
- Instrument: Timpani

Gary Clifford Dennis Brain OBE (12 August 1943 – 20 April 2015) was a New Zealand timpanist and conductor. He was a principal timpanist with the New Zealand Symphony Orchestra until an accident permanently damaged his wrist. He subsequently retrained to become a conductor, studying under Rafael Kubelík for four years and attending master classes with Lorin Maazel. He was a professional conductor from 1990 until his death.

== Background and personal life ==
Brain was born in Palmerston North, New Zealand on 12 August 1943. He was the only child of Charlotte Helen (Ivy) and Clifford Charles Brain. As a child he studied the piano, cello, horn and percussion instruments. Brain was a foundation member of the Manawatu Youth Orchestra and was also a member of the Wellington Youth Orchestra and New Zealand National Youth Orchestra.

Brain lived in Paris with his partner from 1986 until his death. He was divorced and had two children.

== Studies ==
He began his career as a timpanist after attending Berlin's Staatliche Hochschule für Musik. He studied piano, cello and composition with Boris Blacher and timpani with Werner Tharichen, the timpanist of the Berlin Philharmonic. He played in the BBC Training Orchestra in Bristol, United Kingdom.

== Playing career ==
Brain played as a percussionist with the National Orchestra of Wales and the Ulster Orchestra in Ireland and as timpanist with the Royal Opera, London. In 1968 he was appointed principal timpanist with the New Zealand Symphony Orchestra.

After his appointment Brain founded a Concerts in Schools programme. He toured across New Zealand with one tonne of instruments, doing solo performances at schools, colleges and universities. He aimed to bring classical music to young people in a light-hearted and interesting way and at the same time promote the New Zealand Symphony Orchestra. He also took his one-man programme to Brazil, Argentina, Thailand, Singapore, Hong Kong and Egypt.

Also he was a founder of Music for Youth (Jeunesses Musicals) the South Pacific's branch of the World Youth Orchestra.

On a United Airlines flight to the United States in 1989, a suitcase fell from an overhead locker and crushed Brain's wrist. Despite many operations, and with serious septicaemia infections, he was unable to continue his playing career.

== Conducting career ==
He re-trained as a conductor in Paris, conducting and recording various orchestras in Europe. He championed and recorded the works of a little-known Polish-Swiss composer, Czesław Marek.

== Honours ==
In the 1984 New Year Honours, Brain was appointed an Officer of the Order of the British Empire, for services to music. He was also a recipient of a Winston Churchill Memorial Fellowship and Artistes de la Paix UNESCO.

== Compositions ==
- "Verre et Violon", a sonata for violin inspired by Juan Gris's painting "Violin and Glass"
- "Waitomo", soundtrack for a Japanese film
- "Symphony for Large String Orchestra"
- "Manco Capac", a ballet in one act.
