= Robert Wylie (cricketer) =

New Zealand cricketer

Personal information
- Born: 27 April 1948; Lower Hutt, New Zealand
- Died: 8 September 2015 (aged 67); Pahiatua, New Zealand
- Source: Cricinfo, 24 March 2016

Robert Wylie (27 April 1948 – 8 September 2015) was a New Zealand cricketer. He played five first-class matches for Central Districts in 1973/74.
