= 2014 in the United Kingdom =

Events from the year 2014 in the United Kingdom.

== Incumbents ==
- Monarch – Elizabeth II
- Prime Minister – David Cameron (Coalition)

== Events ==
=== January ===
- 3 January – Strong winds and high tides bring flooding to large parts of western England, Wales and Scotland.
- 7 January – Four people are killed when a United States Air Force Sikorsky HH-60G Pave Hawk helicopter, based at RAF Lakenheath in Suffolk, crashes at a nature reserve in Cley next the Sea, north Norfolk.
- 8 January – An inquest jury decides that Mark Duggan, whose death sparked the 2011 England riots was lawfully killed by police.
- 10 January – At the Old Bailey, police officer Keith Wallis pleads guilty to misconduct in a public office over an email he sent to his local MP concerning the Plebgate affair.
- 12 January – Vincent Nichols, the Roman Catholic Archbishop of Westminster is among 19 senior Catholic clergy who will be created Cardinals by Pope Francis on 22 February, it is announced.
- 13 January – The UK Treasury announces that if Scots vote to leave the UK in September's referendum, it will honour all UK government debt issued up to the date of Scottish independence.
- 15 January – Birmingham City Council says that it could be forced to sell off some of its assets to pay £1bn of legal claims over equality of pay.
- 16 January
  - Sir Peter Fahy, the Chief Constable of Greater Manchester Police will face prosecution over safety breaches after an unarmed man was shot dead in Cheshire in March 2012, the CPS announces.
  - Chancellor George Osborne tells BBC News he wants to see a rise in the minimum wage above the rate of inflation.
- 18 January
  - The Labour Party confirms that Del Singh, a candidate for the forthcoming European elections, was among two Britons killed during a suicide bombing at a restaurant in the Afghan capital, Kabul the previous day.
  - 16-year-old Lewis Clarke of Bristol sets a new world record after becoming the youngest person to trek to the South Pole.
- 19 January – The UK Independence Party suspends an Oxfordshire councillor who blamed the floods that hit the country earlier in the month on the government's decision to legalise same-sex marriage "because it had angered God".
- 22 January – UK unemployment falls to 7.1%, surpassing economic forecasts and placing pressure on the Bank of England to raise interest rates. The bank, which said it would consider an increase once unemployment reached 7% says it has no immediate plans to introduce a raise.
- 24 January – Sedgemoor District Council in Somerset declares a "major incident" in flooded areas as forecasters warn of more rain.
- 25 January – Trees are uprooted and structural damage is caused to buildings by lightning as a heavy rainstorm hits the Midlands region.
- 27 January – Research published by the Centre for Cities think tank suggests a widening economic gap between London and the rest of the UK, with ten times more jobs being created in the capital than elsewhere.
- 28 January – Figures released by the Office for National Statistics indicate the UK economy grew by 1.9% in 2013, its highest since 2007, but growth for the final quarter of the year was 0.7%.
- 29 January – During a visit to Scotland, Mark Carney, Governor of the Bank of England says that in the event of Scottish independence, the country would need to give up some powers in return for a currency union with the United Kingdom.
- 30 January – Figures released by the Met Office indicate Southern England and parts of the Midlands have experienced their highest January rainfall since records began in 1910. The announcement comes as military personnel prepare to help residents in flooded areas of Somerset.
- 31 January – The European Union (Referendum) Bill 2013-14 is rejected by the House of Lords after peers vote not to allow more time for a debate, effectively killing off the proposed legislation.

=== February ===
- 1 February – Sally Morgan, the outgoing chair of Ofsted claims she is the victim of a "determined effort" by 10 Downing Street to appoint more Conservatives to key public sector positions.
- 5 February – Part of the South Devon Railway sea wall carrying the railway line linking London with the west of England is washed away by a powerful storm that has hit the UK overnight. Thousands of homes are also left without electricity. Prime Minister David Cameron announces that an extra £100 million will be spent on dealing with the aftermath of the floods that have hit the UK.
- 6 February
  - PC Keith Wallis, who wrote to his MP falsely claiming to have witnessed the Plebgate incident in Downing Street is sentenced to 12 months imprisonment.
  - The Ministry of Defence sends around 40 Royal Marines to the Somerset Levels to help with flood protection as more storms are expected. The government also provides an extra £30 million for repairs.
- 7–23 February – Great Britain competes at the 2014 Winter Olympics in Sochi, Russia and wins 1 gold, 1 silver and 2 bronze medals. This is Great Britain's best performance at a winter games since 1924.
- 8 February
  - Immigration minister Mark Harper resigns from the government after it was disclosed that his cleaner did not have permission to work in the UK.
  - Rail links to South West England are cut off as fresh storms hit the area.
- 11 February – After visiting some of the country's flood hit areas, David Cameron says that "money is no object" as he announces measures to help those affected by the storms. He also warns that things may get worse before they get better. 1,600 troops are deployed to help in the relief effort, with more available if needed.
- 20 February – A 4.1 magnitude earthquake is recorded under the Bristol Channel.
- 22 February – Archbishop of Westminster Vincent Nichols, leader of the Roman Catholic Church in England and Wales, is created a cardinal at a ceremony in Vatican City.
- 25 February – A suspect in the 1982 IRA Hyde Park bombing will not face trial after a judge ruled he cannot be prosecuted because he was mistakenly given an official assurance that he would not face trial. Some 182 letters have been issued as part of the Northern Ireland peace process.
- 26 February – The two men convicted of the murder of Lee Rigby are sentenced to life imprisonment, Michael Adebolajo without the possibility of parole, and Michael Adebowale with the possibility of parole after 45 years.
- 27 February – Prime Minister David Cameron appoints a judge to review the crisis over letters sent to paramilitary suspects advising them they would not be prosecuted after First Minister of Northern Ireland Peter Robinson threatened to resign over the issue. The inquiry will present its findings by end of May.
- 28 February – Spree killer Joanne Dennehy is given a whole life sentence after pleading guilty to the three "Peterborough ditch murders" and two attempted murders committed in 2013.

=== March ===
- 5 March – Birmingham City Council puts the NEC Group up for sale because the authority is facing legal claims over equal pay totalling more than £1bn.
- 6 March
  - Prince Harry launches the Invictus Games, a Paralympic-style sporting championship for wounded soldiers.
  - Home Secretary Theresa May announces a public inquiry into undercover policing after revelations that officers spied on members of Stephen Lawrence's family.
- 7–16 March – Great Britain finish 10th in the medal table of the 2014 Winter Paralympics, with six medals, the most successful Games since Innsbruck in 1984. Four of Britain's medals were won by visually impaired skier Jade Etherington, making her the greatest British Winter Paralympian of all time.
- 11 March – MPs vote 297–239 to allow the controversial Clause 119 element of the Care Bill that will allow ministers to close hospitals in an NHS trust if a neighbouring trust is in financial difficulty, even if the hospital concerned is performing well.
- 18 March – Scottish Labour's Devolution Commission publishes its long-awaited report setting out proposals for enhanced devolution that will be implemented if Scotland votes no in the referendum and Labour are elected in 2015.
- 19 March – 2014 budget: Chancellor George Osborne announces that a new £1 coin will be introduced from 2017. Current £1 coins are vulnerable to counterfeiting, but the new 12-sided two-metal coin, based on the threepenny bit will be more difficult to copy.
- 28 March – BBC research suggests that less than 6% of social housing tenants affected by the bedroom tax—an aspect of the 2012 Welfare Reform Act that penalises tenants in receipt of Housing Benefit with spare bedrooms—have moved house as a result of the controversial measure.
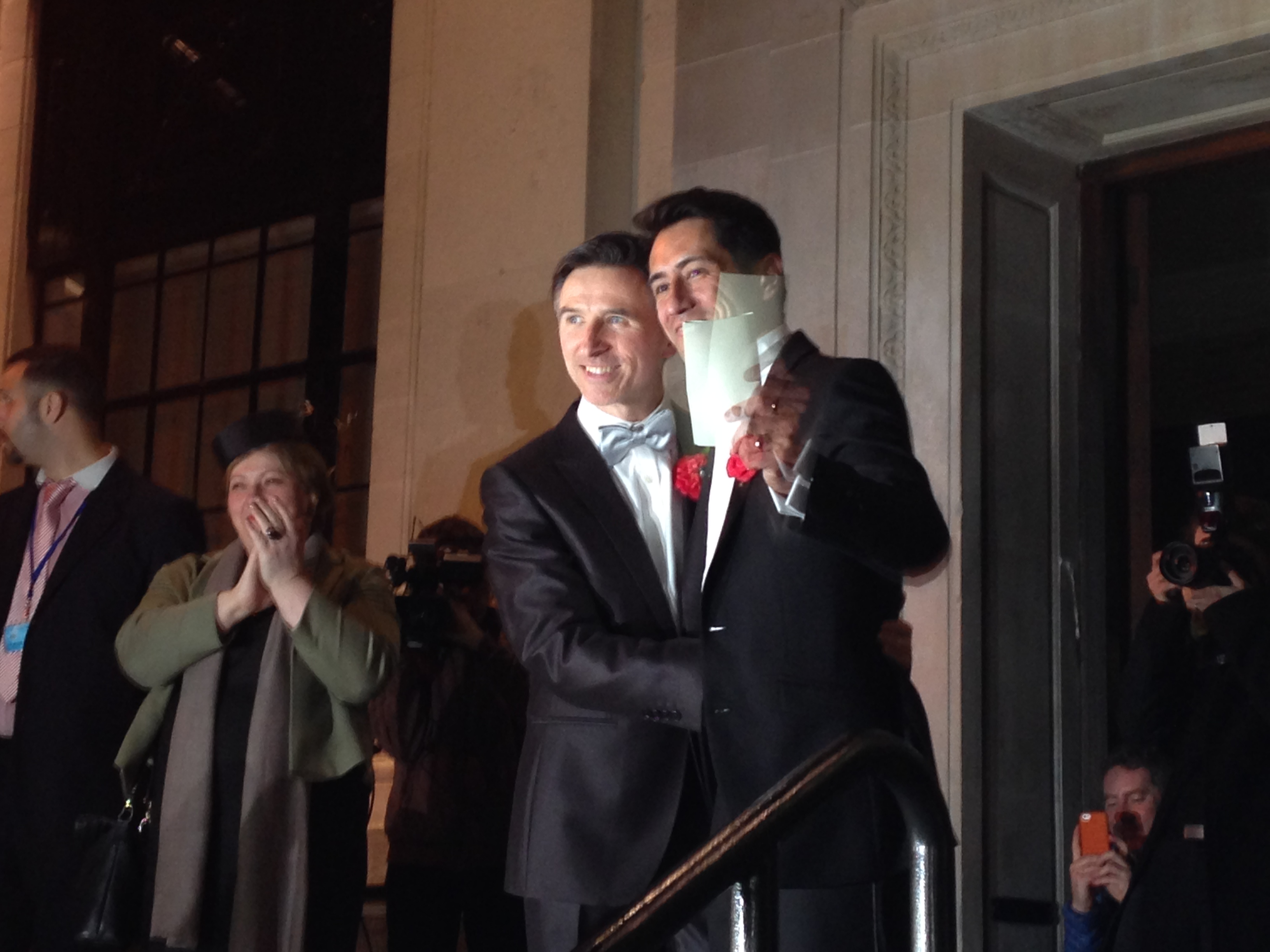
  Same-sex couple marry on the first day they were able to
- 29 March – The first same-sex weddings take place in England and Wales following a change in the law in 2013 allowing same-sex marriage.
- 31 March – A jury is selected to hear a fresh inquest into the 96 deaths caused by the 1989 Hillsborough disaster.

=== April ===
- 5 April – In horse racing, Pineau De Re, trained by Dr. Richard Newland and ridden by 37-year-old Leighton Aspell, who returned to racing after coming out of retirement, wins the 2014 Grand National at Aintree Racecourse with the odds of 25/1.
- 6 April
  - Sheffield's Half Marathon is cancelled because there were not enough water supplies for runners on the route.
  - The Boat Race 2014, contested between Oxford and Cambridge University Boat Clubs, takes place; Oxford winning by 11 lengths (the biggest winning margin since 1973) after the Cambridge boat suffered damage to an oar early in the race.
- 9 April – Maria Miller resigns of Culture Secretary following a row over her expenses, describing her decision as "the right thing to do". Sajid Javid is appointed as her successor.
- 20 April – The Anglican Diocese of Leeds, created by merger of the Church of England's West Yorkshire dioceses of Ripon & Leeds, Bradford and Wakefield, comes into being.
- 22 April – David Moyes is dismissed as Manager of Manchester United ten months after succeeding Alex Ferguson. Ryan Giggs will take temporary charge of the team until a permanent successor is appointed.
- 24 April – Chief Secretary to the Treasury Danny Alexander announces that Cornish people will be granted minority status under Council of Europe rules governing the protection of national minorities.
- 25 April – The government launches an inquiry after the Liverpool Echo reports that Whitehall computers were used to post offensive remarks about the Hillsborough disaster on Wikipedia pages relating to the topic.
- 28 April
  - A youth is detained by police after a female teacher is stabbed to death in front of students at a school in Leeds.
  - Following a trial at Southwark Crown Court, publicist Max Clifford is convicted of eight indecent assaults on women and girls. On 2 May he is jailed for eight years.
  - 3D Repo, a Software as a Service (SaaS) platform provider is founded.
- 29 April – Former Conservative MP Patrick Mercer resigns from his Newark seat after he was suspended from Parliament for 6 months for allegedly asking questions in the House of Commons in exchange for money.

=== May ===
- 1 May – Barrister and part-time judge Constance Briscoe is convicted of perverting the course of justice after a trial at the Old Bailey heard she lied to police investigating the case of former MP Chris Huhne's speeding points. She is sentenced to 16 months in prison the following day.
- 5 May – The World Snooker Championship concludes with Mark Selby defeating defending champion Ronnie O'Sullivan 18–14 in the final to win his first world title
- 7 May – Former Co-operative Bank chairman Paul Flowers is fined £400 after being convicted of possessing cocaine, methamphetamine and ketamine. Flowers stood down from his role at the bank in 2013 due to allegations concerning drug taking, inappropriate expense payments and use of rent boys.
- 8 May – Defence Secretary Philip Hammond announces a review of the British Armed Forces will be brought forward from 2018 to later this year. The review could allow women to serve in front line combat roles for the first time.
- 9 May – The Giro d'Italia cycle race starts in Belfast.
- 14 May – House of Lords Reform Act 2014 allows members of the House of Lords to retire, resign or be removed.
- 17 May – Arsenal defeat Hull City 3–2 after extra time at Wembley Stadium to win the FA Cup Final. Arsenal equal the record of 11 FA Cup trophy wins with this victory.
- 21 May – Clarence House refuses to comment on claims that Prince Charles compared Russian President Vladimir Putin's stance over Ukraine to the actions of Adolf Hitler before World War II during a visit to Canada.
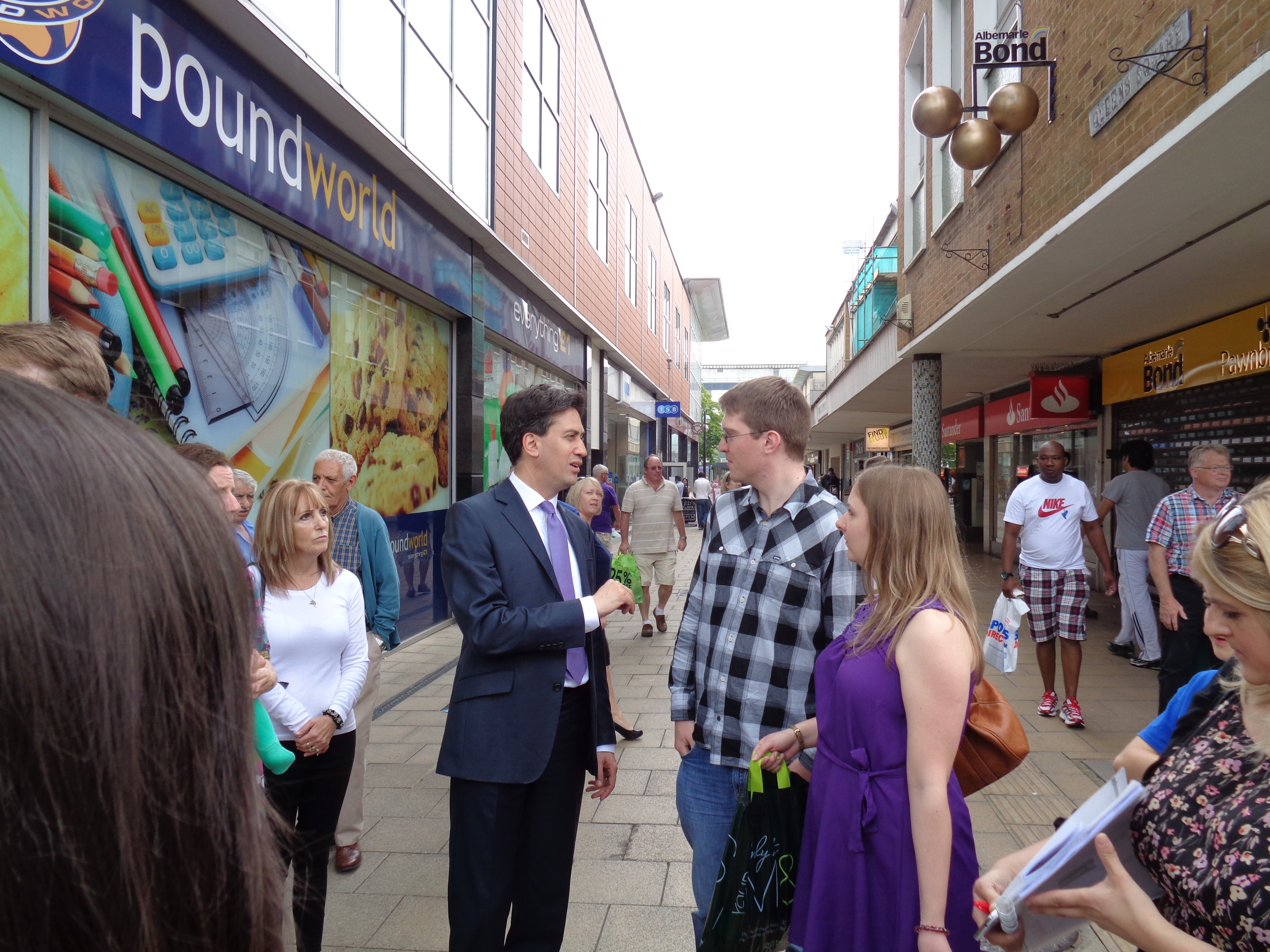
  Ed Miliband talks to a local couple whilst campaigning in Crawley during the run up to elections
- 22 May
  - 2014 European Parliament election: Results show a significant increase in support for UKIP, as they take the most seats, above both the Conservatives and Labour. The Labour Party also make gains, while the Conservatives and Liberal Democrats have poor showings.
  - 2014 United Kingdom local elections: The Conservatives record an increase in vote share but a fall in councils and councillors, while Labour make gains, and the Liberal Democrats are dealt with further falls in support.
- 23 May – A major fire damages Glasgow School of Art, one of Scotland's most iconic buildings, for the first time.
- 24 May – Jonny Wilkinson plays his final rugby match in Britain before retiring from the sport, helping Toulon to beat Saracens 23–6 and win the Heineken Cup.
- 31 May – Three people are killed and one injured after a vehicle collides with spectators at the Jim Clark Rally in the Scottish Borders.

=== June ===
- 5 June
  - US President Barack Obama says the US's interest in the Scottish independence referendum issue is to ensure it retains a "strong, robust, united and effective partner".
  - 2014 Newark by-election: Conservative Robert Jenrick is elected as the new MP, becoming the first Tory candidate to win a by-election for 25 years. However, the party's majority is reduced by 10,000 following a significant UKIP vote.
- 7 June – Education Secretary Michael Gove apologises to David Cameron and a Home Office official over a row with Home Secretary Theresa May about how to tackle Islamic extremism following recent revelations about a Muslim plot to take over schools in Birmingham. In addition, May's special adviser, Fiona Cunningham resigns over the row.
- 9 June – The teaching of creationism is banned from free schools and academies.
- 14–24 June – The England national football team competes at the 2014 World Cup in Brazil. The team is eliminated after the first round, having finished bottom of their group after failing to win any of their 3 matches and gaining just 1 point.
- 17 June – Production of paper at the Whatman plc mill at Maidstone, established in 1740, ceases.
- 21 June – Jane Hedges is installed as the first female Dean of Norwich.
- 24 June – Former News of the World editor and Downing Street Director of Communications Andy Coulson is found guilty of conspiring to hack phones.
- 25 June – The jury in the phone hacking trial is dismissed after failing to reach a verdict on outstanding charges against Andy Coulson. The trial's judge, Mr Justice Saunders, rebukes Prime Minister David Cameron for commenting on Coulson's conviction the previous day while the trial was still ongoing.
- 30 June
  - Andy Coulson and Clive Goodman are to face a retrial on charges they bought royal telephone directories from police officers.
  - Following a trial at Southwark Crown Court, entertainer Rolf Harris is found guilty on 12 counts of indecent assault between 1968 and 1986.

=== July ===
- 4 July
  - Andy Coulson is jailed for 18 months for conspiracy to hack phones.
  - Rolf Harris is sentenced to five years and nine months in prison after being found guilty of twelve counts of indecent assault, but will not face trial over the allegations of downloading sexual images of children.
- 5 July – The 2014 Tour de France starts in Leeds.
- 6 July – Lewis Hamilton wins the 2014 British Grand Prix, his second British Grand Prix victory.
- 7 July – Home Secretary Theresa May announces a major review and inquiry into allegations of historical child abuse across all areas of UK society. The announcement was prompted by reports that the Home Office failed to act on allegations that a paedophile ring operated at Westminster during the 1980s.
- 10 July – Emergency powers giving police the ability to access phone and internet records will be rushed through Parliament after existing legislation was overturned by the European Court of Justice, Prime Minister David Cameron has announced.
- 14 July
  - The Church of England votes to allow women to be ordained as bishops.
  - William Hague steps down as Foreign Secretary as David Cameron begins a cabinet reshuffle. Other departures from government include Kenneth Clarke and David Jones. Hague is also planning to leave Parliament at the next election.
- 15 July
  - Michael Gove is dismissed as Secretary of State for Education and replaced by Nicky Morgan as Cameron seeks to promote more women to his cabinet.
  - Philip Hammond is appointed as Foreign Secretary as Cameron continues his cabinet reshuffle.
- 18 July – 10 Britons are confirmed as having been among 298 people killed in the previous day's crash of Malaysia Airlines Flight 17, which was shot down over eastern Ukraine near the Russian border by pro-Russian separatists.
- 20 July – Conservative MP Dan Byles, who holds the North Warwickshire constituency with his party's smallest majority of 54, announces he will step down at the next general election, becoming the 23rd Tory MP to announce their departure at the end of the current parliament.
- 23 July – The 2014 Commonwealth Games open in Glasgow.

=== August ===
- 2 August – At 40, England's Jo Pavey becomes one of the oldest athletes to win a track-and field-medal at the Commonwealth Games after securing a bronze in the women's 5,000 metres race.
- 3 August – The 2014 Commonwealth Games closing ceremony is held in Glasgow.
- 4 August – Events are held around the UK to mark the 100th anniversary of the outbreak of World War I.
- 5 August – The first of two televised debates between Alex Salmond and Alistair Darling is held at Glasgow's Royal Conservatoire of Scotland ahead September's referendum on Scottish independence.
- 6 August – Mayor of London Boris Johnson announces his intention to seek re-election to Parliament at next year's general election. Johnson had previously said he would not stand as an MP before his mayoral term ended in 2016.
- 10 August – In golf, world number one Rory McIlroy of Northern Ireland wins the PGA Championship. It is his second consecutive major championship win, following The Open Championship, his second PGA Championship win, and fourth major overall.
- 14 August – Police search a Berkshire property belonging to Cliff Richard in relation to an alleged historical sex offense.
- 18 August – Julian Assange, who is wanted for questioning in Sweden, says that he will leave his refuge in the Ecuadorean embassy in London "soon".
- 21 August – 2014 West Midlands Police and Crime Commissioner by-election: David Jamieson is elected, replacing Bob Jones, who died on 1 July.
- 24 August
  - A British man who contracted the Ebola virus in Sierra Leone is flown back to the UK for treatment.
  - British actor, director, producer and entrepreneur Richard Attenborough dies, aged 90, in London.
- 25 August – The second televised debate between Alex Salmond and Alistair Darling is aired from Glasgow.
- 26 August
  - Publication of the Independent Inquiry into Child Sexual Exploitation in Rotherham, which concludes that at least 1,400 children in the area were subjected to sexual abuse between 1997 and 2013.
  - William Pooley, the first Briton to contract Ebola in the current outbreak is being treated with an experimental drug, ZMapp, it is reported.
  - UKIP leader Nigel Farage is chosen by his party's members to fight the South Thanet seat at the next election.
  - Kate Bush stages a comeback concert at the Hammersmith Apollo, her first live performance since 1979.
- 27 August – West Yorkshire Police and Crime Commissioner Shaun Wright, who was head of Rotherham's children's services between 2005 and 2010 and has come under pressure to step down from his post in the wake of the report into child abuse in the town, resigns from the Labour Party, but says he will not relinquish the role of Commissioner.
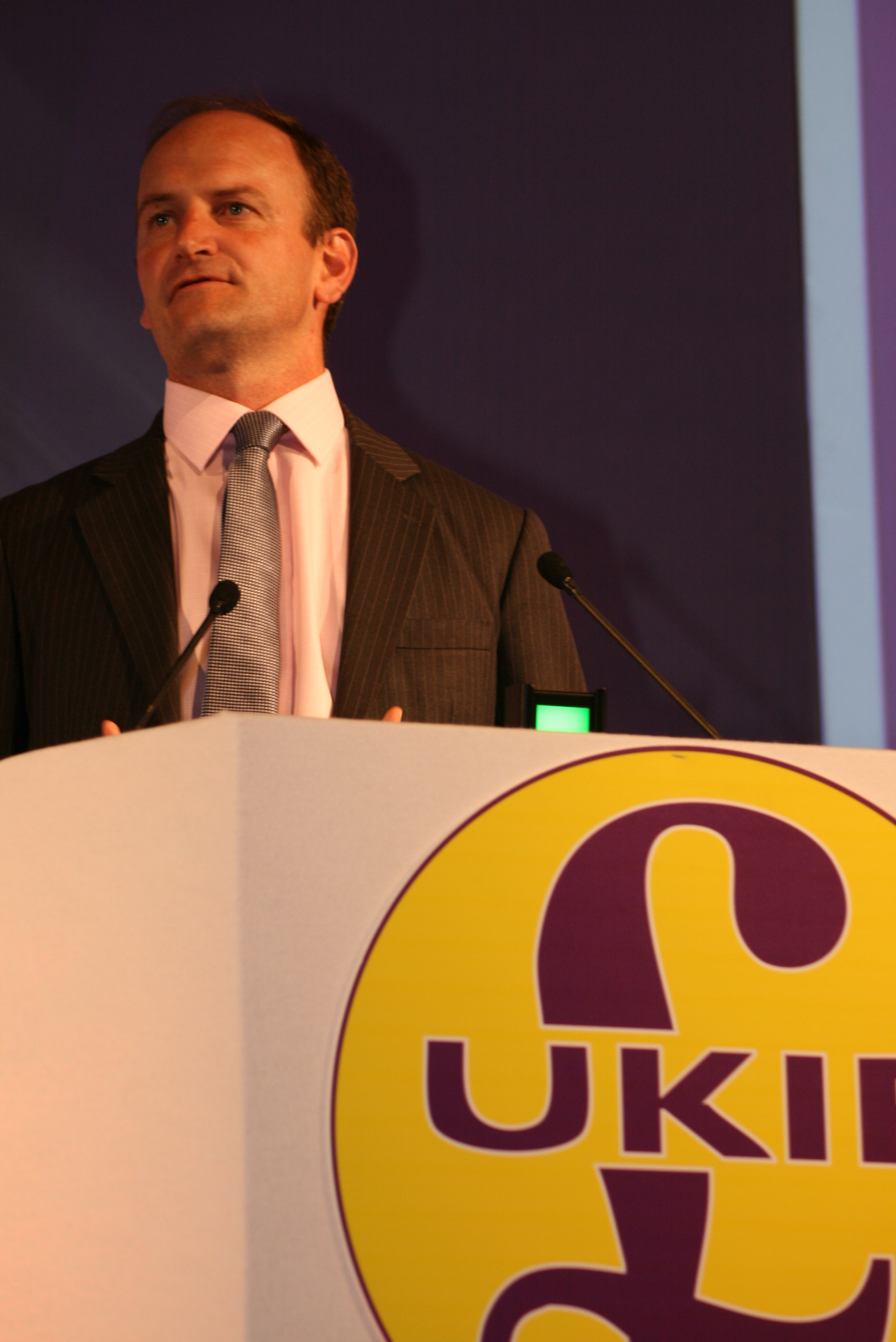
  Douglas Carswell at the UKIP conference soon after defecting
- 28 August
  - Douglas Carswell, the MP for Clacton announces his defection from the Conservative Party to the UK Independence Party, and that he will contest a by-election as a UKIP candidate.
  - Invincible-class aircraft carrier HMS Illustrious (R06) is decommissioned at Portsmouth as the Royal Navy's oldest active ship, leaving the country without a carrier in commission for three years.
- 29 August – Home Secretary Theresa May raises the UK's terror alert from "substantial" "to "severe" in the wake of ongoing conflicts in the Middle East.
- 31 August – Kate Bush becomes the first female artist to have eight albums in the UK Albums Chart at the same time.

=== September ===
- 5 September – MPs vote 306–231 to back the Affordable Homes Bill, designed to relax controversial housing benefit cuts. The Bill passes its first reading after Labour and Lib Dem MPs voted in favour of the legislation.
- 6 September – A YouGov opinion poll on Scottish independence commissioned for The Sunday Times gives the Yes campaign a majority for the first time. The 51–49 result applies when undecided voters are excluded.
- 7 September – Speaking on the BBC's The Andrew Marr Show, Chancellor George Osborne pledges a "plan of action" for further devolution to Scotland if Scots vote No in the forthcoming referendum.
- 8 September
  - Clarence House confirms that Catherine, Duchess of Cambridge, is expecting a second child.
  - Speaking in Edinburgh, former Prime Minister Gordon Brown sets out a timetable for transferring more powers to Scotland in the event of a No vote.
- 9 September
  - The Scottish leaders of the three main UK political parties give their backing to greater devolved powers for the Scottish Parliament as Prime Minister David Cameron and Opposition leader Ed Miliband plan a trip to Scotland to campaign for a No vote.
  - Keith Vaz, Chairman of the Home Affairs Select Committee, says he will write to the Home Secretary about the possibility of emergency legislation to remove Shaun Wright as Police and Crime Commissioner for South Yorkshire.
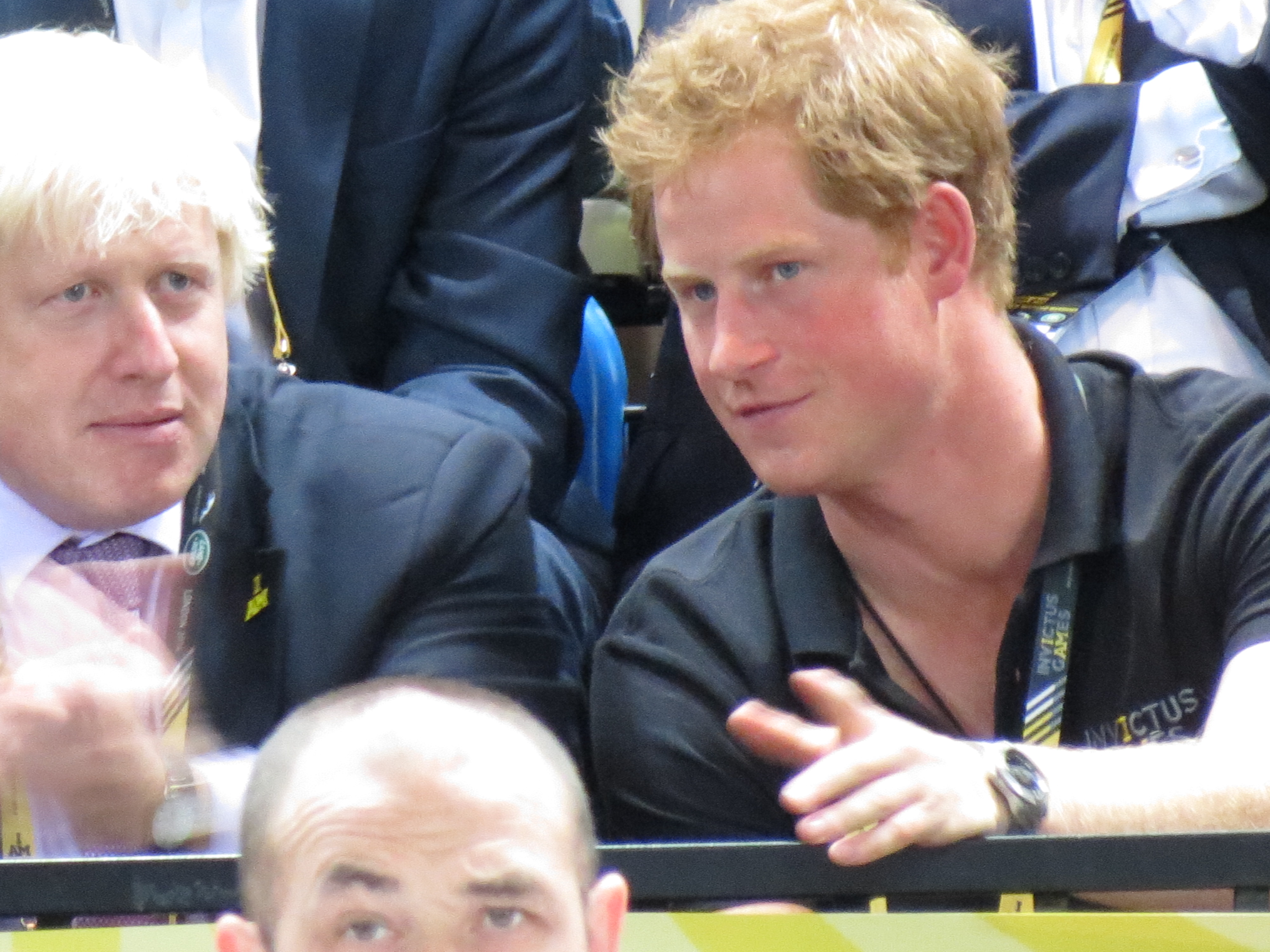
    Prince Harry spectates at the first Invictus Games in London with the city's mayor Boris Johnson later in 2014
- 10 September – The first Invictus Games are held in London, beginning with an opening ceremony attended by the Prince of Wales, the Duchess of Cornwall, Prince Harry and Prince William.
- 12 September – Boris Johnson is selected as the Conservative candidate for Uxbridge and South Ruislip.
- 13 September – David Cameron condemns the killing of British hostage David Haines as an "act of pure evil", after the release of a video purporting to show the humanitarian aid worker's beheading.
- 14 September – The closing ceremony of the inaugural Invictus Games takes place in London, with a music concert at Olympic Park featuring artists and groups such as Bryan Adams, Ellie Goulding, James Blunt and the Kaiser Chiefs.
- 15 September – 'The Vow', a joint statement by the leaders of the three main unionist parties, David Cameron, Ed Miliband and Nick Clegg, promising more powers for Scotland in the event of a No vote, is published in the Daily Record.
- 16 September – Shaun Wright resigns as Police and Crime Commissioner for South Yorkshire, triggering a by-election.
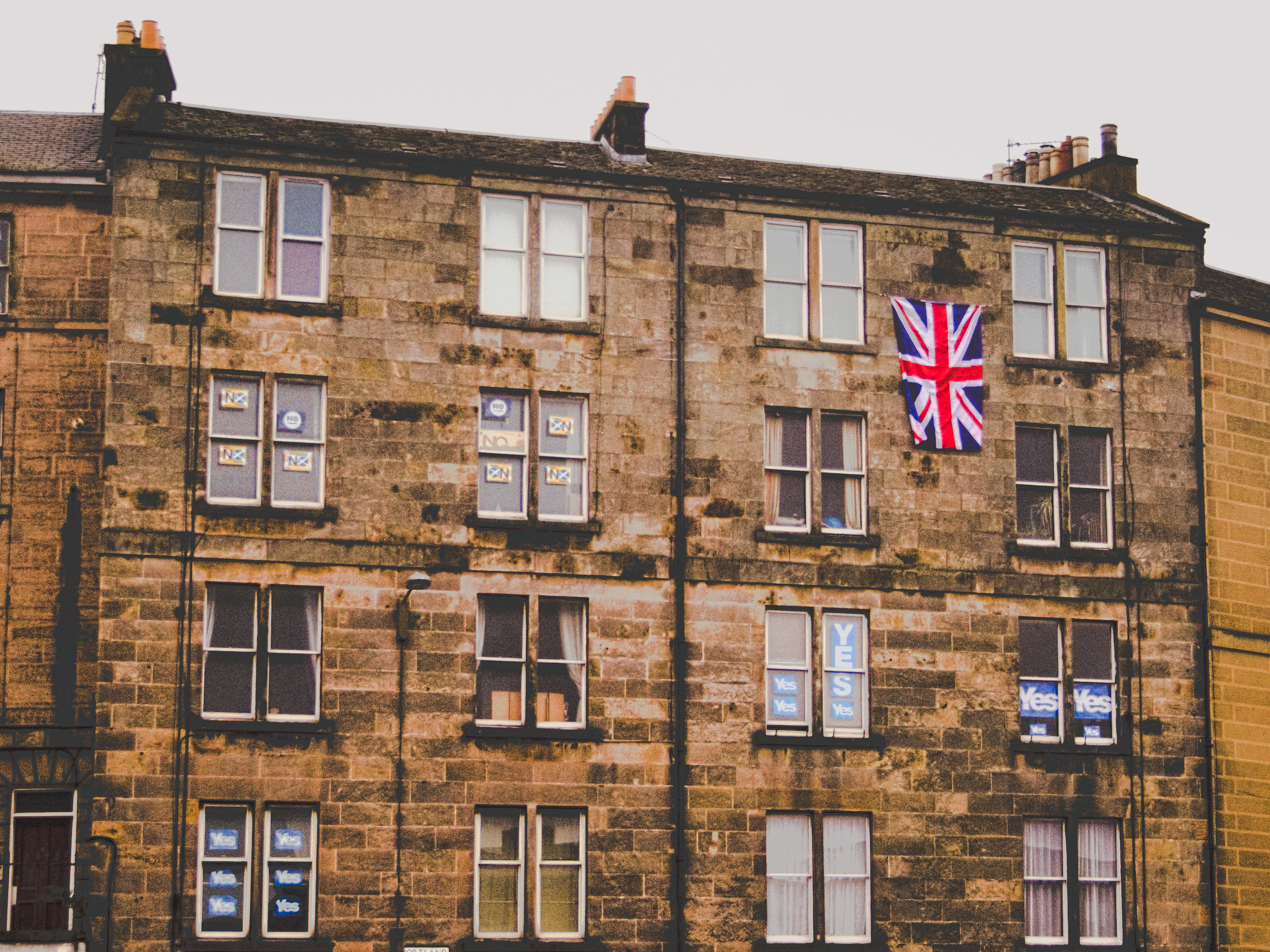
  A tenement block in Leith with signage indicating occupants allegiances on the day of the referendum.
- 18 September – 2014 Scottish independence referendum: Scotland votes "No" to Scottish independence by a majority of 383,937 votes (No: 2,001,926; Yes: 1,627,989) and a margin of 55.3% to 44.7%. Voter turnout in the referendum is 84.5%, a record high for any election held in the UK since the introduction of universal suffrage in 1918.
- 19 September
  - Alex Salmond announces his resignation as First Minister of Scotland and leader of the Scottish National Party following the referendum.
  - Prime Minister David Cameron announces plans for further devolution of powers to Scotland as well as to the other countries of the United Kingdom with the Smith Commission established under Lord Smith of Kelvin to convene talks.
- 24 September
  - Parliament will be recalled on 26 September to allow MPs to discuss possible UK participation in the US led airstrikes against Islamic State, it is announced.
  - Nicola Sturgeon launches her campaign to become leader of the Scottish National Party and Scottish First Minister in the forthcoming leadership election.
- 26 September – MPs vote 524–43 vote in favour of endorsing Britain's involvement in the US-led airstrikes against Islamic State following a seven-hour parliamentary debate.
- 27 September – Mark Reckless, the MP for Rochester and Strood, quits the Conservative Party and defects to UKIP, triggering a by-election. The announcement is made as the Conservatives gather for their annual party conference in Birmingham.
- 30 September – Police hunting for missing teenager Alice Gross find a body in the River Brent. A murder inquiry is launched the following day after the body is confirmed to be that of the missing girl.

=== October ===
- 1 October – Membership of the Scottish National Party trebles from 25,000 to 75,000 in the 13 days since the referendum on Scottish independence
- 3 October – Prime Minister David Cameron says that Britain will do all it can "to hunt down [and bring] to justice" the killers of British hostage Alan Henning after a video was posted online purporting to show his beheading.
- 6 October – Police confirm that a body found in woodland at Boston Manor Park, west London two days earlier is that of Arnis Zalkalns, the main suspect in the hunt for the killer of Alice Gross.
- 9 October – By-elections at:
  - Clacton: Douglas Carswell is re-elected as a UKIP candidate, having defected from the Conservatives, giving UKIP their first elected MP.
  - Heywood and Middleton: Liz McInnes is elected as the new MP, narrowly beating UKIP, who are boosted by a huge surge in support.
- 15 October – Nicola Sturgeon is confirmed as the next leader of the Scottish National Party, succeeding Alex Salmond, after she was the only candidate to put their name forward in the leadership election. She will officially become leader at the party's conference next month, and subsequently be appointed First Minister of Scotland.
- 20 October – 45 people are injured after a bus overturns and collides with a car in Hertfordshire.
- 23 October – Senior politicians and the Metropolitan Police criticise a decision by the Parole Board to release prisoner Harry Roberts, who shot dead three police officers in 1966.
- 24 October – Johann Lamont resigns as leader of the Scottish Labour Party with immediate effect, triggering a leadership election.
- 26 October – Three people are killed after a group of seven surfers get into trouble in the sea at Mawgan Porth, Cornwall.
- 27 October – Plans are unveiled by the Met Office for a £97m supercomputer to study weather and climate. Using 13 times more processing power than previous systems, it will perform 16,000 trillion calculations per second.
- 28 October – The President of Zambia, Michael Sata, dies in hospital in London after being flown to the United Kingdom for treatment on 19 October.
- 30 October – 2014 South Yorkshire Police and Crime Commissioner by-election: Labour's Alan Billings wins the election, replacing Shaun Wright, who resigned in the wake of the Rotherham child sexual exploitation scandal.
- 31 October – With a temperature of 23.6C recorded in Gravesend, Kent and Kew Gardens, Greater London, this year's Halloween becomes the warmest on record, surpassing the previous record of 20.0C set in 1968.

=== November ===
- 2 November – Alistair Darling, leader of the Better Together campaign and former Chancellor of the Exchequer and announces he will step down as an MP at the next general election.
- 3 November
  - The youth who fatally stabbed Ann Maguire at a Leeds school in April is named as 16-year-old Will Cornick. He is sentenced to be detained at Her Majesty's pleasure with a minimum tariff of 20 years.
  - Liberal Democrat Home Office Minister Norman Baker resigns from his post, claiming that working in the department is like "walking through mud".
- 6 November – A woman is murdered in an act of cannibalism at a hostel in Argoed, Wales. The suspect Matthew Williams dies after Gwent Police fire a Taser at him.
- 7 November – Chancellor George Osborne is criticised as he reveals that the UK will pay its EU budget surcharge in two interest-free sums next year totalling £850m, instead of a larger lump sum of £1.7bn by 1 December, after a rebate from Brussels due in 2016 appears to have been brought forward. Labour describes the announcement as "smoke and mirrors", whilst Shadow Chancellor Ed Balls says it is a "diplomatic disaster for the government".
- 11 November – The last ceramic poppy is laid at the Tower of London memorial art installation and joins the 888,245 flowers commemorating the armistice and centenary of World War I.
- 14 November
  - Nicola Sturgeon succeeds Alex Salmond as leader of the Scottish National Party at their annual conference in Perth, while Stewart Hosie is elected to the deputy leadership role vacated by Sturgeon.
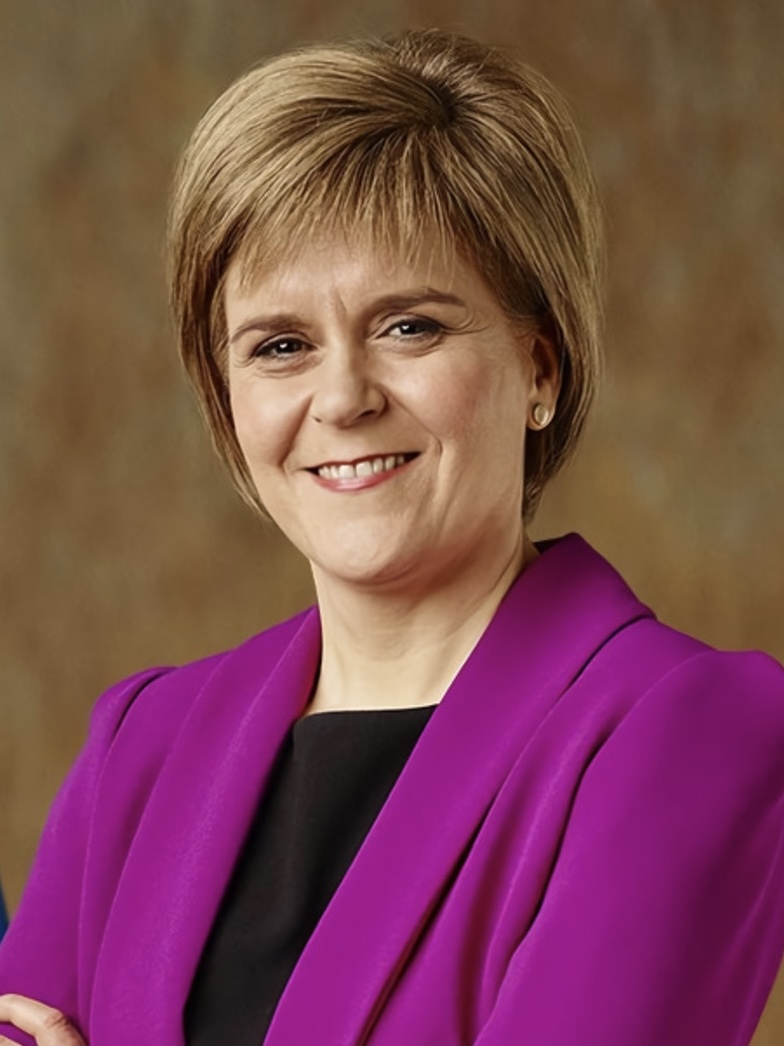
    Nicola Sturgeon is elected leader of the SNP
  - Angus Sinclair, the serial killer and rapist who murdered Helen Scott and Christine Eadie in Edinburgh's Old Town in 1977 is jailed for 37 years, the longest ever sentence handed out by a Scottish court.
  - Former BBC DJ Chris Denning pleads guilty to further sexual abuse of boys aged 9 to 16 during the 1970s and 1980s.
- 15 November – Five teenagers are killed in a motoring accident on the A630 near Doncaster.
- 16 November – A case of bird flu is confirmed at a duck breeding farm in Yorkshire. The deadly H5N1 strain is ruled out and officials say that the risk to public health is low.
- 17 November
  - The Church of England adopts legislation paving the way for the appointment of women as bishops.
  - Band Aid 30 release their cover of the track "Do They Know It's Christmas?", thirty years after the original, this time to raise money towards the Ebola crisis in Western Africa.
- 19 November
  - A British-led Moon mission – Lunar Mission One – is announced.
  - The Scottish Parliament elects Nicola Sturgeon as the first female First Minister of Scotland.
- 20 November
  - 2014 Rochester and Strood by-election: Voters go to the polls after MP Mark Reckless seeks re-election under the UKIP label, having defected from the Conservative Party. The results are announced the following day: Reckless is re-elected, but with a smaller than expected majority of less than 3,000.
  - Sheffield United withdraws its offer to allow footballer and convicted rapist Ched Evans to use its training facilities following a public backlash against the club.
- 21 November – The launch is announced of The National, Scotland's first daily newspaper to take a pro-independence stance.
- 23 November – Britain's Lewis Hamilton wins the 2014 Formula One world title after finishing first in the Abu Dhabi Grand Prix.
- 24 November – The National launches on a five-day trial basis.
- 25 November – A report into the murder of Lee Rigby by the Intelligence and Security Committee suggests that MI5 could have prevented the killing had they been allowed access to an online forum in which one of the perpetrators discussed murdering a soldier five months before the May 2013 incident.
- 27 November
  - The Smith Commission, established by David Cameron to look at enhanced devolution for Scotland following the referendum, publishes its report, recommending the Scottish Parliament should be given the power to set income tax rates and bands.
  - A judge says he is satisfied MP and former chief whip Andrew Mitchell called police officers "plebs" during a 2012 row in Downing Street as he rejects a High Court libel action brought by the politician against The Sun newspaper.
- 28 November – Black Friday promotions spark chaos and violence in stores across the country. Police are called to at least ten supermarkets amid large crowd surges as people hunt for the best offers.

=== December ===
- 1 December
  - Former Prime Minister Gordon Brown announces he is to stand down as an MP at the next general election after 32 years.
  - Suffolk doctor Myles Bradbury pleads guilty to abusing eighteen young cancer patients in his care at Addenbrooke's Hospital in Cambridge between 2009 and 2013. He is sentenced to 22 years.
- 3 December – As part of the Autumn Statement, Chancellor George Osborne replaces stamp duty for home buyers with a graduated scheme similar to income tax.
- 5 December – Scotland reduces its drink-drive limit from 80 mg to 50 mg, bringing the country's legal limit into line with much of mainland Europe.
- 6 December – Reports surface that former Scottish First Minister Alex Salmond will stand for Parliament in the Gordon constituency at the 2015 general election. Salmond confirms his intention to contest the constituency the following day.
- 7 December – Greetings card retailer Clintons withdraws a 'tongue-in-cheek' Christmas card detailing ten reasons why Santa Claus "must live on a council estate" after it was deemed to be offensive by the public.
- 10 December – A "weather bomb" hits the north of the UK, causing winds of up to 144 mph, cutting power from tens of thousands of homes, and creating travel disruptions across land and sea.
- 12 December – Disruption is caused at airports across the country due to a computer system failure at the UK's air traffic control centre, causing hundreds of delays and over eighty cancellations at Heathrow. Delays and cancellations continue the following day.
- 13 December – MP Jim Murphy is elected as the new Scottish Labour leader, beating MSPs Neil Findlay and Sarah Boyack with 55.7% of the vote, declaring it his "driving purpose" to end poverty and inequality. Meanwhile, Kezia Dugdale is elected as the party's new deputy leader.
- 16 December – Leader of the House of Commons William Hague sets out Conservative plans for English votes for English laws to prevent MPs representing constituencies in Wales, Scotland and Northern Ireland from voting on legalisation that does not effect their parts of the UK.
- 17 December – Libby Lane becomes the new Bishop of Stockport and the first woman to become a bishop of the Church of England since the change to canon law just a month ago.
- 19 December
  - An off-duty police officer dies in hospital after he was attacked during a night out in Liverpool.
  - A High Court judge orders the winding up of Hereford United football club following a petition from the Inland Revenue over unpaid tax debts.
- 22 December – Six people are killed after a refuse lorry crashes into a group of people in Glasgow's George Square.
- 25 December – Parcel delivery firm City Link announces that it has gone into administration after substantial losses. The general secretary of the RMT union calls the timing of the announcement a "disgrace".
- 29 December – The Scottish Government confirms a case of Ebola being treated in a Glasgow hospital. The victim is a healthcare worker who had travelled back from Sierra Leone the previous day.
- 31 December
  - Healthcare worker Pauline Cafferkey receives an unnamed experimental anti-viral drug and blood plasma from Ebola survivors as part of her treatment.
  - City Link's administrators announce the loss of 2,356 jobs after a deal to buy the firm fell through.

=== Undated ===
- 2014 is the UK's warmest year since records began with an average temperature of 9.9C, 0.2C higher than the previous record set in 2006, according to a Met Office report of 5 January 2015. This means that eight of the UK's top ten warmest years have occurred since 2002.
- New car sales reach a 10-year high of nearly 2.5 million. The Ford Fiesta was Britain's best selling car for the sixth successive year, while the likes of Audi and Fiat also enjoy impressive sales figures.

== Publications ==
- Lynda Bellingham's memoir There's Something I've Been Dying to Tell You.
- Jeff Kinney's novel 'Diary of A Wimpy Kid: The Long Haul'
- Russell Brand's non-fiction Revolution.
- John Campbell's biography Roy Jenkins: A Well Rounded Life.
- Ben Elton's novel Time and Time Again.
- Howard Jacobson's novel J.
- Pip Jones' chapter book Squishy McFluff: The Invisible Cat!
- Roy Keane's autobiography The Second Half (written with Roddy Doyle).
- Helen Macdonald's memoir H is for Hawk.
- Henry Marsh's memoir Do No Harm: Stories of Life, Death and Brain Surgery.
- David Mitchell's novel The Bone Clocks.
- Michael Morpurgo's children's novel Listen to the Moon.
- David Nicholls' novel Us.
- Jamie Oliver's cookbook Jamie's Comfort Food.
- Ali Smith's novel How to Be Both.
- Zoe Sugg's young adult novel Girl Online.
- David Walliams' children's novel Awful Auntie.

== Births ==
- 17 January – Mia Tindall, daughter of Zara Phillips and Mike Tindall michal wojno

== Deaths ==
=== January ===
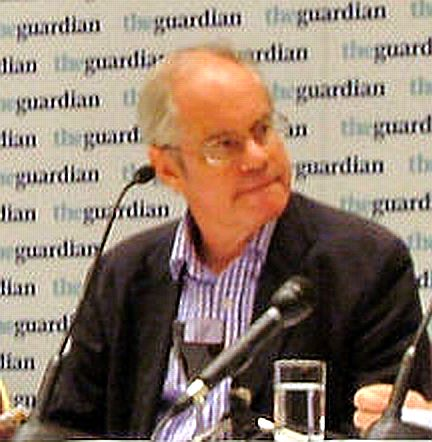
Journalist Simon Hoggart in 2006

- 1 January
  - Peter Austin, 92, brewer (Ringwood Brewery).
  - Dorothy Baldwin, 111, supercentenarian.
  - Billy McColl, 62, actor (Doctor Who).
- 2 January
  - Elizabeth Jane Howard, 90, novelist.
  - Ian Mackley, 71, diplomat, High Commissioner to Ghana (1996–2000).
- 3 January
  - Eric Barnes, 76, footballer.
  - Sir Michael Neubert, 80, politician, MP for Romford (1974–1997).
- 4 January – Andy Holden, 65, long-distance runner.
- 5 January
  - Terry Biddlecombe, 72, National Hunt jockey.
  - Brian Hart, 77, racing driver and engineer.
  - Simon Hoggart, 67, journalist
  - E. J. Lowe, 63, philosopher.
  - David Maxwell Walker, 93, lawyer and academic.
  - Ray Williams, 86, rugby union player.
- 6 January
  - Jim Appleby, 79, footballer.
  - John Ash, 88, ornithologist.
  - James Moorhouse, 90, politician, Member of the European Parliament (1979–1999).
- 7 January
  - Paul Goggins, 60, politician, MP for Wythenshawe and Sale East (since 1997).
  - Raymond Paul, 85, Olympic fencer (1952, 1956). (death announced on this date)
  - Roy Warhurst, 87, footballer (Birmingham City).
- 9 January
  - Michael Jacobs, 61, writer.
  - Albert McCann, 72, footballer (Portsmouth).
- 10 January
  - Kathryn Findlay, 60, architect.
  - Margo Maeckelberghe, 81, artist.
  - Ian Redmond, 53, Scottish footballer.
- 11 January – Jerome Willis, 85, British actor.
- 12 January
  - Alexandra Bastedo, 67, actress.
  - John Button, 70, racing driver.
  - Tony Harding, 72, comics artist.
  - Patrick Horsbrugh, 93, British-born architecture professor.
  - John Horsley, 93, actor.
  - Sir Robert Scholey, 92, business executive, Chairman of British Steel (1986–1992).
- 13 January
  - Bobby Collins, 82, Scottish footballer.
  - Ronny Jordan, 51, jazz guitarist.
- 14 January
  - Rex Adams, 85, footballer.
  - Alan Blackburn, 78, footballer. (death announced on this date)
  - Sir Nicholas Browne, 66, diplomat.
  - Eric James Mellon, 88, ceramic artist.
- 16 January – Stan Watson, 76, footballer (Darlington).
  - Roger Lloyd-Pack, 69, actor.
- 17 January
  - Frank Cockett, 97, surgeon and art historian.
  - Alistair McAlpine, Baron McAlpine of West Green, 71, politician, businessman and author.
- 18 January
  - Komla Dumor, 41, Ghanaian journalist and news presenter, died in London.
  - Sarah Marshall, 80, actress.
- 19 January
  - Sir Christopher Chataway, 82, broadcaster, politician and businessman, MP for Lewisham North (1959–1966) and Chichester (1969–1974).
  - Gordon Hessler, 88, film director (Kiss Meets the Phantom of the Park) and screenwriter.
  - Michał Joachimowski, 63, Olympic triple jumper (1972, 1976).
  - Bert Williams, 93, footballer (Wolverhampton Wanderers, national team).
- 20 January – George Scott, 84, professional wrestler.
- 21 January
  - Dieter Bortfeldt, 72, graphic designer and philatelist.
  - Tony Crook, 93, racing driver.
  - Jocelyn Hay, 86, broadcasting campaigner.
  - Warren Lamb, 90, management consultant.
  - Graham Stevenson, 58, cricket player.
- 22 January
  - Arthur Bellamy, 71, footballer.
  - Patrick Brooking, 76, army general.
- 24 January – Lisa Daniely, 84, actress.
- 25 January
  - Heini Halberstam, 88, mathematician.
  - Karl Slym, 51, business executive, managing director of Tata Motors.
- 26 January
  - Ollie Conmy, 74, footballer.
  - Margery Mason, 100, actress and theatre director.
  - John Farquhar Munro, 79, politician, MSP for Ross, Skye and Inverness West (1999–2011).
  - Gerald B. Whitham, 86, applied mathematician.
- 27 January – Brian Gibbs, 77, English football player and manager.
- 28 January
  - Nigel Jenkins, 64, poet.
  - Kenneth Rose, 89, journalist and author.
- 29 January
  - Jim Rone, 78, Anglican clergy, Archdeacon of Wisbech (1984–1993).
  - Piers Wedgwood, 4th Baron Wedgwood, 59, peer
- 31 January
  - Adegboyega Folaranmi Adedoyin, 91, Olympic athlete (1948).
  - Sebastian Barker, 68, poet.
  - Mike Flanagan, 85, Israeli Armoured Corps soldier.
  - Baden Powell, 82, footballer.
  - Sir David Price, 89, politician, MP for Eastleigh (1955–1992).

=== February ===
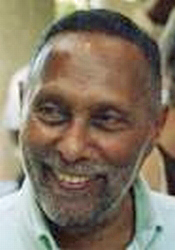
Stuart Hall

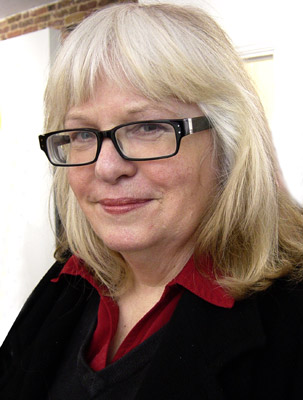
Alexis Hunter

- 1 February – Tony Hateley, 72, footballer.
- 2 February
  - Keith Bradshaw, 74, rugby union player.
  - Nicholas Brooks, 73, medieval historian.
  - Cecil Franks, 78, politician, MP for Barrow and Furness (1983–1992).
  - Nigel Walker, 54, footballer.
  - Clifford Williams, 74, rugby player.
- 4 February – Richard Aldridge, 68, palaeontologist.
- 5 February – Samantha Juste, 69, television personality (Top of the Pops).
- 6 February
  - Tommy Dixon, 84, footballer (West Ham United).
  - David Robertson, 70, car racing manager (Jenson Button, Kimi Räikkönen) and team owner (Double R Racing).
- 7 February
  - David Alexander-Sinclair, 86, army general (1st Armoured Division).
  - Christopher Barry, 88, television director (Doctor Who).
  - Georgina Henry, 53, journalist, deputy editor of The Guardian (1995–2006).
- 8 February
  - Bernard Hedges, 86, cricket player (Glamorgan).
  - Mike Melluish, 81, cricket player and administrator, President of the Marylebone Cricket Club (1991–1992).
  - Andy Paton, 91, footballer.
  - Sir Richard Peirse, 82, air marshal.
- 9 February
  - William Goodreds, 93, cricketer.
  - Sir Graham Hills, 87, chemist.
  - Eddie Holding, 83, football player and manager.
  - Roland Oliver, 90, academic and author.
  - Logan Scott-Bowden, 93, army general, first commander of the Ulster Defence Regiment (1970–1971).
  - Sir John Stibbon, 79, army general, Master-General of the Ordnance (1987–1991).
  - Roger Tomlinson, 80, geographer.
- 10 February
  - Len Chalmers, 77, footballer (Leicester).
  - Mike Cottell, 82, civil engineer.
  - Stuart Hall, 82, cultural theorist.
  - Gordon Harris, 73, footballer.
  - Alan R. Katritzky, 85, chemist.
  - Ian McNaught-Davis, 84, television presenter and mountaineer, President of the UIAA (1995–2004).
- 12 February
  - Sir Diarmuid Downs, 91, automotive engineer (Ricardo).
  - John Pickstone, 69, historian of science.
  - John Poppitt, 91, footballer.
- 13 February
  - Alan Burns, 83, author (Europe After the Rain).
  - Lorna Casselton, 75, biologist.
  - Jimmy Jones, 85, footballer.
  - Ken Jones, 83, actor (Porridge, The Squirrels).
  - Rose Finn-Kelcey, 68, artist.
  - John Mortimore, 80, cricket player.
- 14 February
  - Sir Tom Finney, 91, footballer (Preston North End).
  - John Wilson, 2nd Baron Moran, 89, diplomat and peer.
  - Clifford Wright, 91, Anglican prelate, Bishop of Monmouth.
- 15 February – Christopher Malcolm, 67, actor (The Empire Strikes Back, Highlander, The Rocky Horror Show).
- 16 February – Jaroslav Krejčí Jr., 98, Czech-born sociologist, academic and historian.
- 17 February
  - Gordon Bell, 79, cartoonist. (death announced on this date)
  - Frank Wappat, 84, radio personality (BBC Newcastle).
- 18 February
  - Gordon Bowra, 77, surgeon (British Antarctic Survey).
  - Peter Davies, 88, rugby player.
  - Arthur Rowley, 80, footballer (Liverpool).
  - Malcolm Tierney, 75, actor (Doctor Who, Star Wars, Braveheart).
- 19 February – Duffy Power, 72, rock and blues singer.
- 20 February – Sam Falle, 95, British diplomat, Ambassador to Kuwait and Sweden.
- 21 February
  - Beatrix Miller, 89, magazine editor (Vogue).
  - Bob Sharpe, 88, footballer (Darlington).
  - John Strawson, 93, army officer.
- 22 February
  - Keith Bridges, 84, rugby league player.
  - John Christoforou, 92, painter.
  - Sir Richard Ground, 63, judge, Chief Justice of the Turks and Caicos Islands (1998–2004) and Bermuda (2004–2012).
  - Sigbert Prais, 85, economist.
- 23 February
  - John Grant, 83, children's author.
  - Alice Herz-Sommer, 110, supercentenarian, world's oldest Holocaust survivor, subject of The Lady in Number 6.
  - Mike Parker, 84, typographer and software executive (Helvetica).
  - Norman Whiting, 93, cricketer (Worcestershire).
- 24 February
  - Alexis Hunter, 65, painter and photographer.
  - Christopher Luxmoore, 87, Anglican prelate, Bishop of Bermuda (1984–1989).
  - Anna Reynolds, 83, opera singer.
  - Alex Russell, 91, footballer.
- 25 February
  - Dennis Turner, Baron Bilston, 71, politician, MP for Wolverhampton South East (1987–2005).
  - Peter Callander, 74, British songwriter and record producer.
  - Tom Margerison, 90, science journalist, broadcaster and New Scientist founder.
- 26 February – Gordon Nutt, 81, footballer (Coventry City).
- 27 February
  - Bryan Clarke, 81, geneticist.
  - Eric Lockwood, 81, rugby league player (Wakefield Trinity).
- 28 February – David Holmes, 87, journalist and broadcaster, BBC News Political Editor (1975–1980).

=== March ===
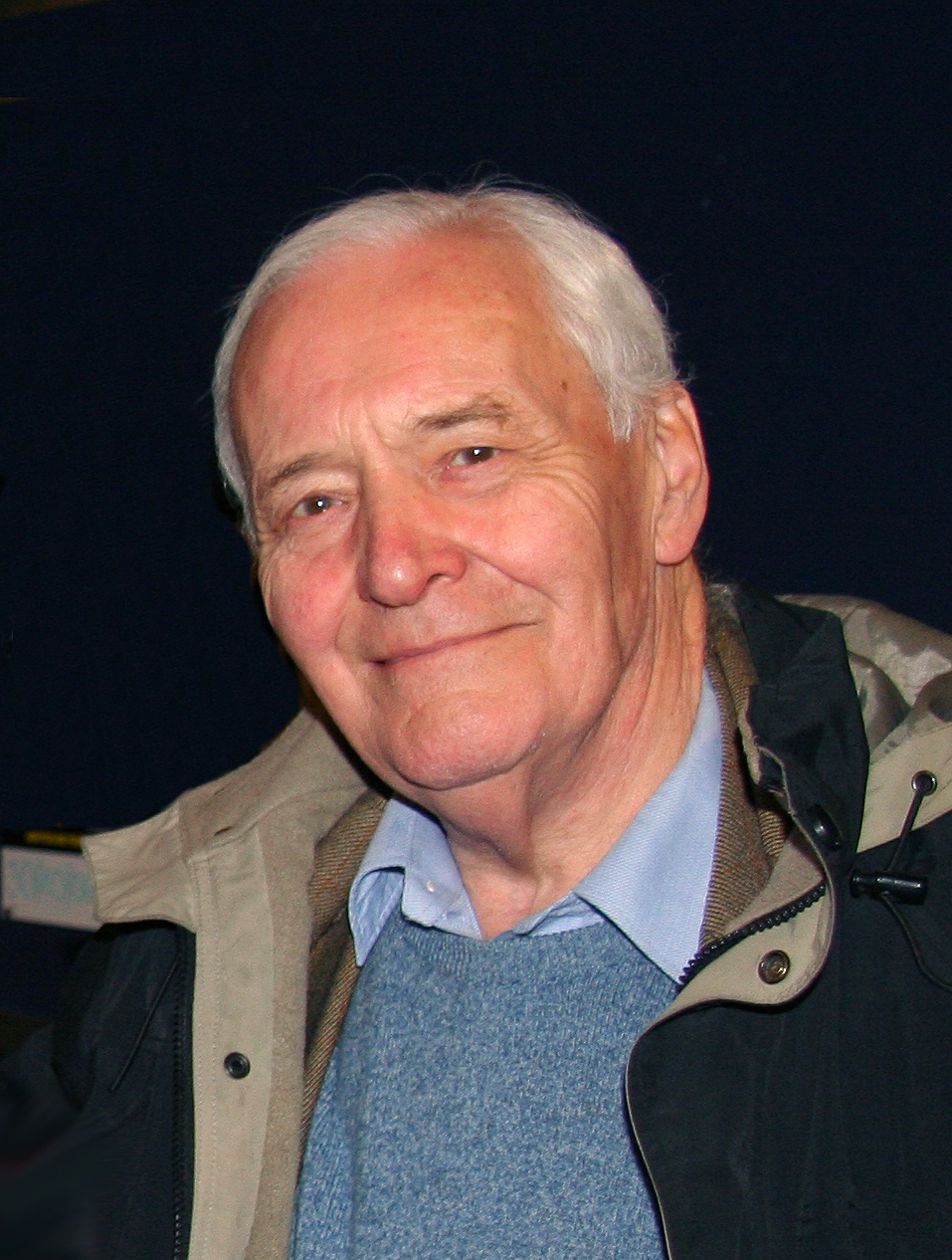
Tony Benn in 2007

- 1 March – John Wilkinson, 73, politician, MP for Bradford West (1970–1974) and Ruislip-Northwood (1979–2005).
- 3 March
  - Stan Rickaby, 89, footballer (West Bromwich Albion).
  - Billy Robinson, 74, wrestler and trainer.
- 4 March
  - Barrie Cooke, 83, artist.
  - Dame Elaine Kellett-Bowman, 90, politician and barrister, MP for Lancaster (1970–1997) and MEP (1975–1984).
- 5 March
  - Iain Campbell, 72, biophysicist.
  - Sir Robin Dunn, 96, judge, Lord Justice of Appeal (1980–1984).
  - John Uzzell Edwards, 79, painter.
  - Nigel Groom, 89, author and perfume connoisseur.
  - Ernest Anthony Lowe, 85, economist.
  - Ailsa McKay, 50, economist and government policy advisor.
  - Dave Sampson, 73, rock singer.
- 6 March
  - Gurth Hoyer-Millar, 84, rugby union and cricket player.
  - Sheila MacRae, 92, actress (The Honeymooners).
  - Gwen Matthewman, 86, speed knitter.
  - Margaret Spufford, 78, historian.
  - Marion Stein, 87, pianist.
- 7 March
  - Sir Richard Best, 80, diplomat, Ambassador to Iceland (1989–1991).
  - Bob Charles, 72, footballer (Southampton).
  - Peter Dunn, 87, engineer.
  - Sir Thomas Hinde, 88, novelist.
  - Peter Laker, 87, cricketer (Sussex).
- 8 March
  - James Ellis, 82, actor (Z-Cars).
  - Helmut Koenigsberger, 95, historian.
- 9 March
  - John Christie, 84, footballer (Southampton, Walsall).
  - Monika Kinley, 88, art dealer, collector and curator.
- 10 March

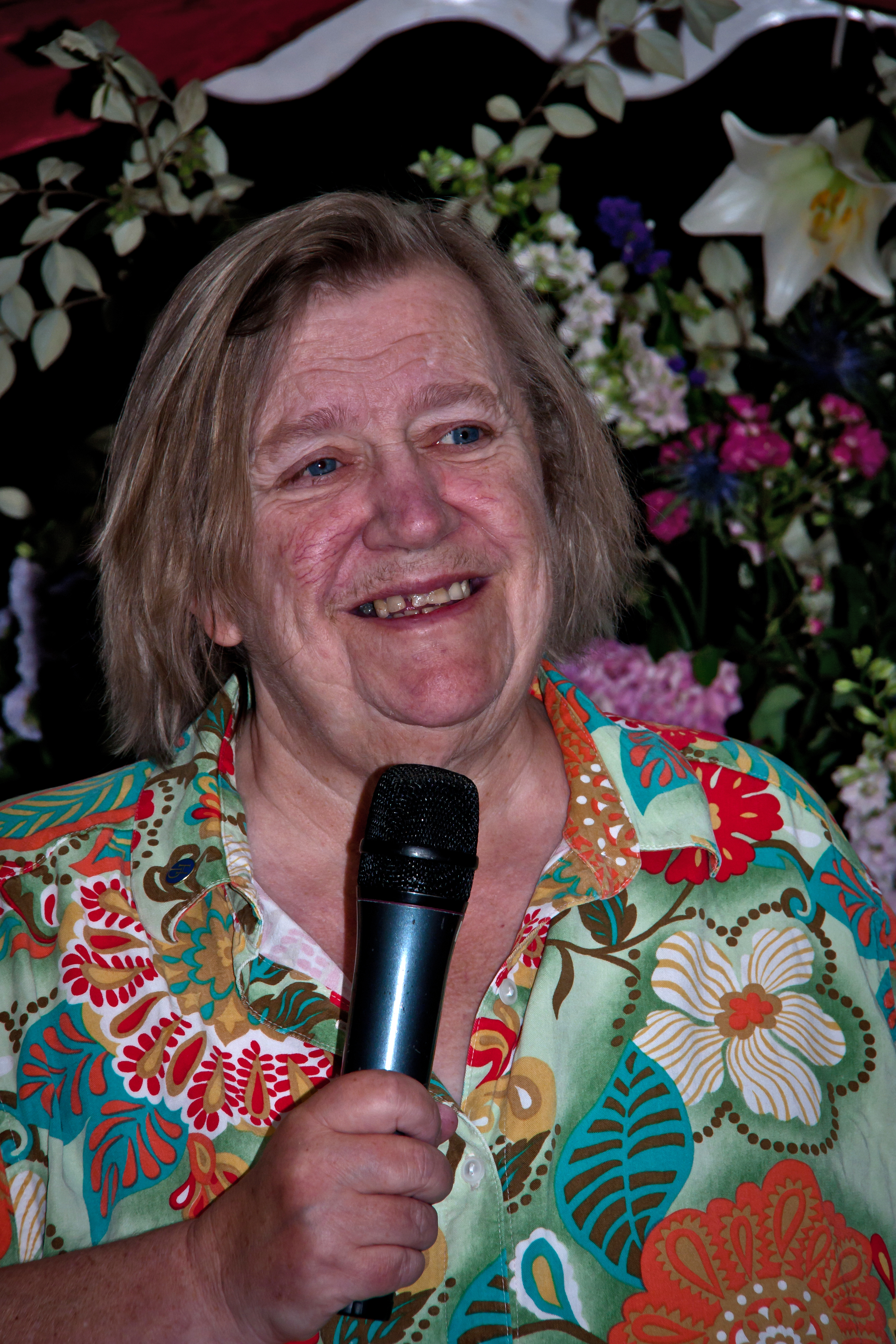
Clarissa Dickson Wright

  - Richard De Vere, 46, illusionist (Blackpool Pleasure Beach).
  - Vince Radcliffe, 68, footballer.
  - John Baird Tyson, 85, explorer and mountaineer.
- 11 March
  - Marilyn Butler, 77, literary critic and academic, Rector of Exeter College, Oxford (1993–2004).
  - Bob Crow, 52, trade unionist, General Secretary of the RMT (since 2002).
  - Raymond Leslie Morris, 84, murderer (Cannock Chase murders).
- 12 March
  - George Donaldson, 46, singer (Celtic Thunder).
  - Calvin Palmer, 73, footballer.
- 13 March
  - Edward Haughey, Baron Ballyedmond, 70, politician and peer, founder of the Norbrook Group, helicopter crash.
  - Raymond Flood, 78, cricket player (Hampshire).
- 14 March
  - Tony Benn, 88, politician, Minister of Technology (1966–1970), Secretary of State (1974–1979), MP for Bristol South East (1950–1960, 1963–1983) and Chesterfield (1984–2001).
  - Alec Gaskell, 81, footballer.
  - John Bernard Philip Humbert, 9th Count de Salis-Soglio, 66, soldier and lawyer.
  - Hugh Lunghi, 93, military interpreter (Winston Churchill).
  - Sam Peffer, 92, commercial artist.
- 15 March – Clarissa Dickson Wright, 66, chef and broadcaster, one half of the Two Fat Ladies.
- 16 March
  - Andrew Kenneth Burroughs, 60, consultant physician.
  - Steve Moore, 64, cartoonist and writer.
- 17 March – Oswald Morris, 98, cinematographer.
- 18 March
  - Albert Dormer, 88, bridge player.
  - Derek Knee, 91, military interpreter (Field Marshal Montgomery).
- 19 March – Eric Davies, 86, football administrator and politician, chairman of Rhyl F.C., mayor of Rhyl.
- 20 March – Roy Peter Martin, 83, author.
- 21 March
  - Michael Henley, 76, Anglican primate, Bishop of St Andrews, Dunkeld and Dunblane (1995–2004).
  - Dennis Jackson, 82, footballer.
  - Sir Colin Turner, 92, politician, MP for Woolwich West (1959–1964).
- 22 March
  - Mickey Duff, 84, boxing manager and promoter.
  - Ken Plant, 88, footballer (Nuneaton Borough, Colchester United).
- 23 March
  - Ashley Booth, 74, footballer (St Johnstone, East Fife).
  - Walter Ewbank, 96, Anglican prelate, Archdeacon of Westmorland and Furness (1971–1977), Archdeacon of Carlisle (1978–1984).
  - Peter Oakley, 86, internet vlogger.
  - William Peters, 90, diplomat and activist (Jubilee 2000).
- 24 March
  - Bryan Orritt, 77, footballer (Birmingham City, Middlesbrough).
  - John Rowe Townsend, 81, children's author (The Intruder).
- 25 March
  - Lorna Arnold, 98, nuclear historian and author.
  - Jerry Roberts, 93, wartime codebreaker, member of the Testery unit.
- 26 March – Marcus Kimball, Baron Kimball, 85, politician, MP for Gainsborough (1956–1983).
- 27 March
  - Jeffery Dench, 85, actor (First Knight).
  - Derek Martinus, 82, television director (Doctor Who, Blake's 7, Z-Cars).
  - Michael Schofield, 94, sociologist and campaigner.
- 28 March
  - Michael F. Lappert, 85, chemist.
  - Sam McAughtry, 91, writer and broadcaster.
- 30 March
  - Michael Edmonds, 87, artist, co-founder of 56 Group Wales.
  - Kate O'Mara, 74, actress (The Brothers, Dynasty, Doctor Who).
  - Fred Stansfield, 96, footballer.
- 31 March
  - Anthony Beattie, 69, civil servant.
  - Bob Larbey, 79, comedy scriptwriter (Please Sir!, The Good Life, As Time Goes By).

=== April ===
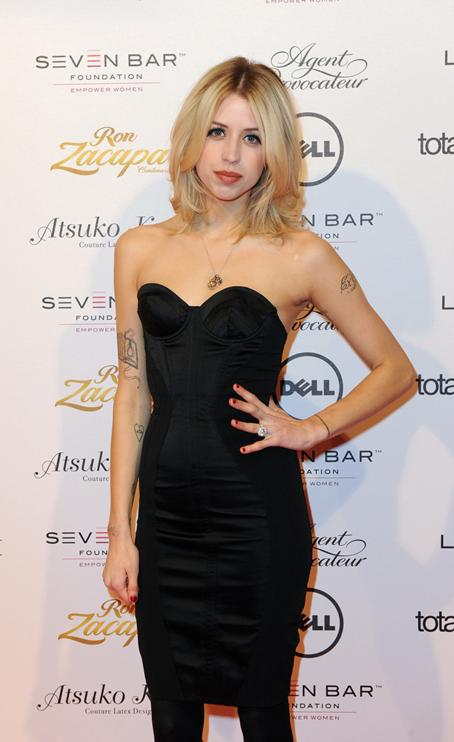
Peaches Geldof in 2012

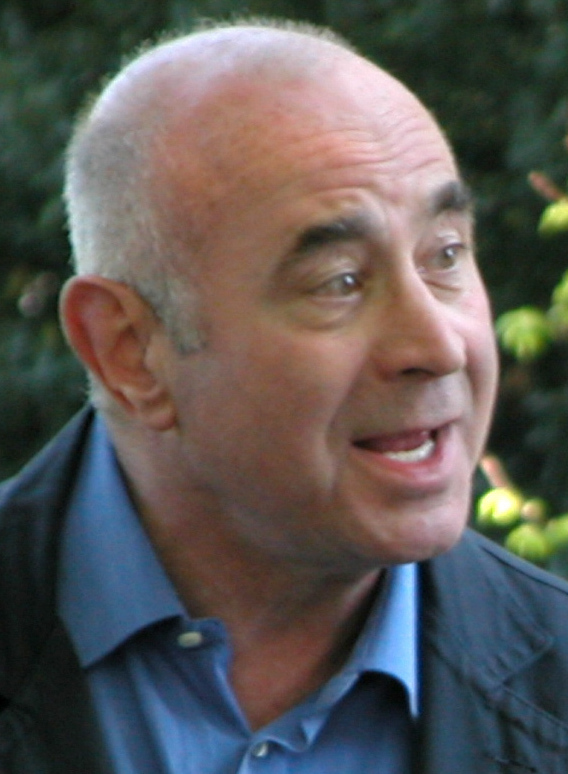
Bob Hoskins in 2009

- 1 April – Colin Scott, 80, Anglican prelate, Bishop of Hulme (1984–1998).
- 2 April – Lyndsie Holland, 75, opera singer and actress.
- 4 April
  - Archie Boyd, 95, Royal Air Force officer.
  - Margo MacDonald, 70, politician, MP for Glasgow Govan (1973–1974), MSP for Lothian (since 1999).
- 5 April
  - Andy Davidson, 81, footballer (Hull City).
  - Alan Davie, 93, painter and musician.
  - Gordon Smith, 59, footballer (St Johnstone, Aston Villa).
  - Peter Thorne, 90, fighter pilot and diplomat.
- 6 April
  - Dave Blakey, 84, English footballer (Chesterfield).
  - Sir Maurice Drake, 91, High Court judge.
- 7 April
  - Peaches Geldof, 25, journalist, model, TV presenter.
  - James Alexander Green, 88, mathematician.
  - Perlita Neilson, 80, actress.
  - John Shirley-Quirk, 82, opera bass-baritone singer.
- 8 April
  - Sandy Brown, 75, footballer.
  - Phil Hardy, 69, film and music journalist.
- 9 April
  - Robin Holliday, 81, molecular biologist.
  - Sir James Holt, 91, medieval historian.
- 10 April
  - Richard Hoggart, 95, academic and author (The Uses of Literacy).
  - Sue Townsend, 68, novelist and playwright (Adrian Mole series).
- 11 April
  - Edna Doré, 92, actress (EastEnders).
  - Patrick Seale, 83, journalist, foreign correspondent and historian (The Observer).
  - Rolando Ugolini, 89, footballer (Middlesbrough).
- 12 April
  - Robert Potter, 64, geographer.
  - Hamish Watt, 88, politician, MP for Banffshire (1974–1979).
- 13 April
  - John Brunsdon, 80, artist.
  - Peter Drummond-Murray of Mastrick, 84, herald and banker.
- 14 April
  - Peter Ellson, 88, footballer (Crewe Alexandra).
  - Tony Gray, 86, clown and comedian (The Alberts).
  - Wally Olins, 83, business consultancy and public relations executive, Chairman of Saffron Brand Consultants.
  - Rosemary Tonks, 85, poet and author.
- 16 April
  - Stan Kelly-Bootle, 84, songwriter, author and computer engineer.
  - Frank Kopel, 65, footballer (Dundee United).
- 17 April
  - Bernat Klein, 91, fashion designer and spy.
  - Anthony Marriott, 83, actor and playwright.
- 18 April
  - Tommy Crossan, 44, dissident Irish republican (Continuity IRA).
  - David McClarty, 63, politician, MLA for East Londonderry (since 1998).
  - Brian Priestman, 87, maestro and conductor (Denver Symphony Orchestra).
  - Zev Sufott, 86, diplomat, Israeli Ambassador to the Netherlands and China.
- 19 April
  - Derek Cooper, 88, broadcaster (The Food Programme) and food journalist.
  - George Downton, 85, cricketer (Kent).
  - Ian McIntyre, 82, radio broadcaster and executive (BBC Radio 3, BBC Radio 4).
- 20 April
  - Peter Scoones, 76, underwater photographer (Life on Earth, Planet Earth, The Blue Planet).
  - Julian Wilson, 73, horse racing correspondent and broadcaster (BBC).
- 22 April
  - Harry Bell, 89, English footballer.
  - Mohammad Naseem, 90, Islamic leader and political activist, chairman of Birmingham Central Mosque.
  - Gordon Smith, 93, army officer.
- 23 April
  - Mark Shand, 62, travel writer and conservationist.
  - Patric Standford, 75, composer.
- 24 April – Sandy Jardine, 65, footballer (Rangers, Hearts, national team).
- 26 April
  - William Ash, 96, American-born Marxist writer, Royal Canadian Air Force pilot during World War II.
  - Joan Bruce, 86, actress.
  - Philip Sugden, 67, historian and true crime writer (Jack the Ripper).
- 28 April
  - Gerard Benson, 83, poet.
  - Richard Kershaw, 80, broadcaster and journalist.
  - Jane Macnaught, 55, television producer (Coronation Street, Stars in their Eyes).
  - Bruce Woodgate, 74, aerospace engineer (Hubble Space Telescope).
- 29 April
  - Bob Hoskins, 71, actor (Who Framed Roger Rabbit, Mona Lisa, Hook).
  - Daphne Pochin Mould, 93, author and photographer.
- 30 April
  - Michael Brock, 94, historian.
  - Chris Harris, 71, stage actor.
  - Julian Lewis, 67, developmental biologist.

=== May ===
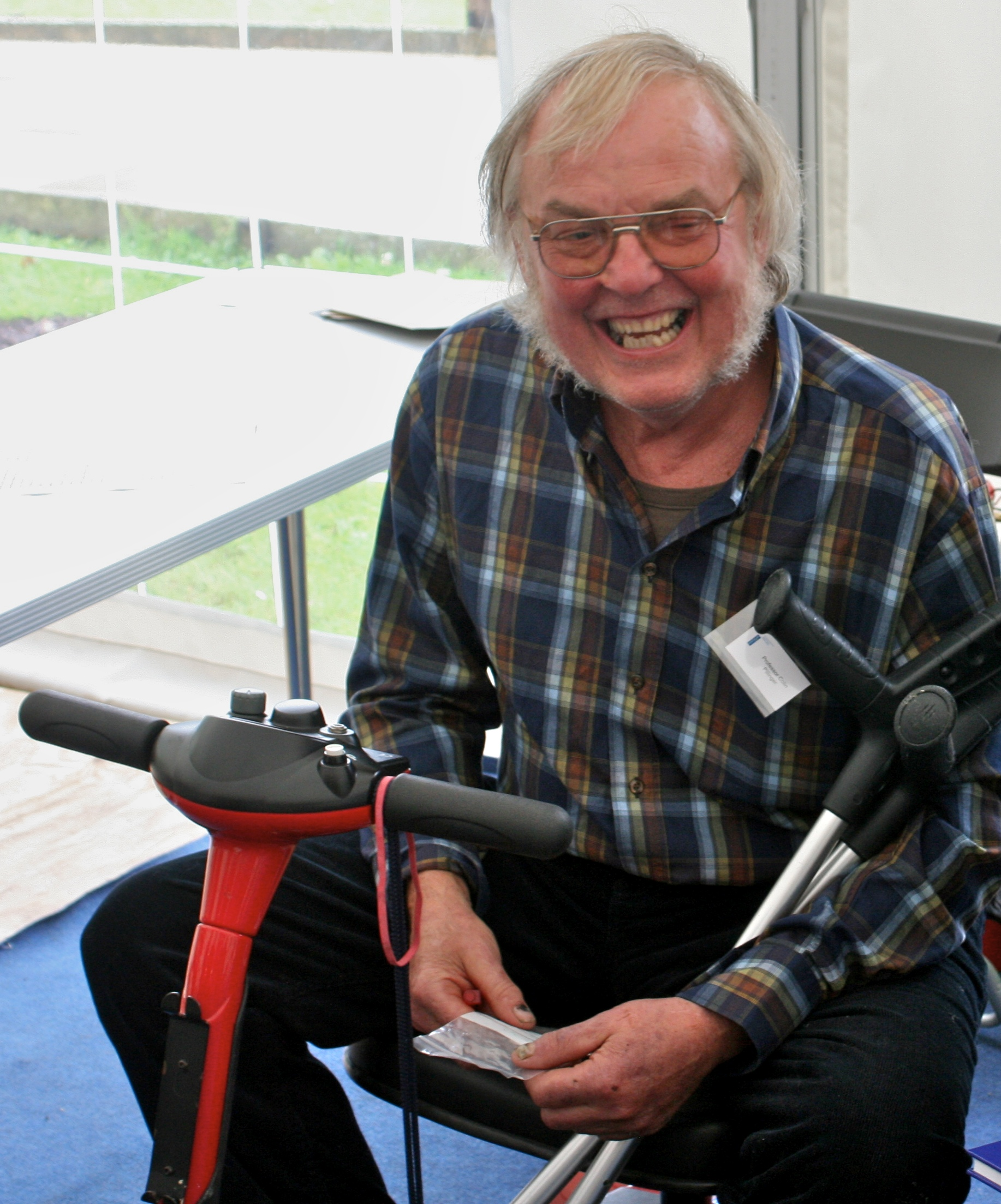
Colin Pillinger in 2009

- 1 May
  - Clive Clark, 73, footballer.
  - Mark Elvins, 74, priest and author, Warden of Greyfriars, Oxford (2007–2008).
  - Richard Percival Lister, 99, author, poet, artist and metallurgist.
  - Paul Whetnall, 67, badminton player and coach.
  - Eli Woods, 91, comedian and character actor.
- 2 May
  - Sir William Benyon, 84, politician, MP for Buckingham (1970–1983) and Milton Keynes (1983–1992).
  - Martin Dent, 88, academic, co-founder Jubilee 2000.
  - Nigel Stepney, 55, Formula One mechanic (Ayrton Senna, Michael Schumacher), involved in 2007 Formula One espionage controversy.
  - Nigel Vaulkhard, 66, auto racing team owner (Bamboo Engineering, World Touring Car Championship).
- 3 May – Dick Douglas, 82, politician, MP for Clackmannan and Eastern Stirlingshire (1970–1974), Dunfermline (1979–1983) and Dunfermline West (1983–1992).
- 4 May
  - Elena Baltacha, 30, tennis player.
  - Mike Hawker, 77, songwriter.
  - Al Pease, 92, racing driver (Formula One).
  - John Hartley Williams, 72, poet.
- 5 May – Timothy John Byford, 72, television director.
- 6 May
  - Roger Dimmock, 78, Royal Navy admiral, Naval Secretary (1985–1987).
  - Antony Hopkins, 93, composer, conductor and pianist.
  - Leslie Thomas, 83, author (The Virgin Soldiers).
  - Cedric Thornberry, 77, lawyer, Assistant-Secretary-General of the United Nations.
- 7 May
  - Sir George Christie, 79, opera manager (Glyndebourne Festival Opera).
  - Colin Pillinger, 70, planetary scientist.
  - David Prentice, 77, artist.
- 9 May
  - Terry Farmer, 82, footballer (Rotherham United).
  - Mary Stewart, 97, novelist (Merlin series).
- 10 May – Patrick Woodroffe, 74, fantasy and surrealist artist.
- 11 May
  - Billie Fleming, 100, long-distance cyclist.
  - David Rowlands, 66, civil servant.
  - Harry Stopes-Roe, 90, philosopher and humanist, Vice President of the British Humanist Association.
  - Alan Wills, 52, record executive, founder of Deltasonic.
- 12 May
  - Ernie Chataway, 62, heavy metal guitarist (Judas Priest).
  - Hugh McLeod, 81, rugby union player.
  - Joe Mence, 93, cricket player (Berkshire).
  - Hugh Smyth, 73, politician, Leader of the Progressive Unionist Party (1979–2002), Lord Mayor of Belfast (1994–1995).
  - James Walston, 65, political scientist.
- 13 May
  - Bill Bainbridge, 63, brewer (Three Tuns Brewery).
  - Tessa Watts, 68, music video producer.
- 14 May
  - Anthony Christopher, 67, politician, leader of Rhondda Cynon Taf County Borough Council (since 2012).
  - Douglas Cummings, 67, cellist (London Symphony Orchestra).
  - John M. Fitzpatrick, 65, urologist.
  - Jeffrey Kruger, 83, music business executive (Flamingo Club, Ember Records).
  - Alexander Murray MacBeath, 90, mathematician.
  - Stephen Sutton, 19, charity fundraiser.
  - Terry Wire, 73, politician, Mayor of Northampton.
- 15 May
  - Peter Ayerst, 93, World War II RAF fighter and test pilot (Supermarine Spitfire).
  - Michael Mence, 70, cricketer (Berkshire).
  - Geoff Richards, 85, footballer (West Brom).
- 16 May
  - Louise Wilson, 52, fashion academic (Central Saint Martins).
- 17 May – David Abbott, 76, advertising executive and copywriter.
- 19 May
  - Michael Aldrich, 72, inventor.
  - Simon Andrews, 29, motorcycle racer.
  - Sir Jack Brabham, 88, racing driver, triple Formula One world champion (1959, 1960, 1966).
  - Count Suckle, 80, sound system operator and club owner.
  - Phil Sharpe, 77, cricketer (Yorkshire, national team).
- 20 May
  - Terry Bell, 69, footballer (Reading). (death announced on this date)
  - Fran Broady, 75, Trotskyist and social activist (Alliance for Workers' Liberty).
  - Robyn Denny, 83, artist.
  - Prince Rupert Loewenstein, 80, financial adviser (The Rolling Stones), Bavarian aristocrat.
  - Barbara Murray, 84, actress (Passport to Pimlico, The Plane Makers).
- 21 May – Duncan Cole, 55, footballer (New Zealand national football team).
- 22 May – Edward Howel Francis, 89, geologist.
- 23 May – John Satterthwaite, 88, Anglican prelate, Bishop of Gibraltar (1970–1993).
- 24 May
  - David Allen, 78, cricketer (Gloucestershire, national team).
  - John McCormack, 79, light middleweight boxer, Olympic bronze medalist (1956).
- 25 May – Malcolm Simmons, 68, motorcycle speedway racer (Poole Pirates), World Team Cup Winner (1974, 1975, 1977), World Pairs Champion (1976, 1977, 1978).
- 26 May – Sir John Gorman, 91, politician, Northern Ireland MLA for North Down (1998–2003).
- 27 May
  - Ruth Flowers, 74, disc jockey.
  - Malcolm MacDonald, 66, music critic.
  - Sir Robert Porter, 90, politician, Minister of Home Affairs and Health and Social Services (1969), Northern Ireland MP (NI) for Queen's University of Belfast (1966–1969) and Lagan Valley (1969–1973).
  - Charles Swithinbank, 87, glaciologist.
- 28 May – Stan Crowther, 78, footballer.
- 31 May
  - Jack Casley, 88, football player (Torquay, Headington) and scout.
  - Mary Soames, Baroness Soames, 91, aristocrat.
  - Sir Godfrey Taylor, 88, local government leader.

=== June ===
- 1 June
  - Brian Farmer, 80, footballer.
  - John Hills, 53, jockey and horse trainer.
  - Sir Hugo White, 74, Royal Navy officer, Governor of Gibraltar (1995–1997), Admiral and Commander-in-Chief Fleet (1992–1995).
- 3 June
  - Sir Eldon Griffiths, 89, politician, MP for Bury St Edmunds (1964–1992), Minister for Sport (1970–1974).
  - Karl Harris, 34, motorcycle racer.
  - David MacLennan, 65, actor and theatre producer, founded 7:84
- 4 June
  - Neal Arden, 104, actor.
  - John Baker, 86, Anglican prelate, Bishop of Salisbury (1982–1993).
  - Cliff Severn, 88, cricket player and child actor (A Christmas Carol, How Green Was My Valley).
  - Sydney Templeman, Baron Templeman, 94, judge and law lord.
- 5 June – Johnny Leach, 91, table tennis player, World Table Tennis Champion (1949, 1951), team champion (1953), President of the ETTA.
- 6 June
  - Douglas Bartles-Smith, 77, Anglican priest, Archdeacon of Southwark⋅(1985–2004).
  - Eric Hill, 86, children's writer and illustrator (Spot the Dog).
  - David Lockwood, 85, sociologist.
  - Lorna Wing, 85, psychiatrist, co-founder of the National Autistic Society, coined the term "Asperger syndrome".
- 7 June
  - Kevin Elyot, 62, scriptwriter (Clapham Junction) and playwright (My Night with Reg).
  - Jane Gray, 112, supercentenarian, oldest living Scottish-born person and Australian resident.
  - Roger Mayne, 85, photographer.
  - Stephen A. Metcalf, 86, missionary.
  - Norman Willis, 81, trade unionist, General Secretary for the TUC (1984–1993).
- 8 June
  - John Bartlett, 85, cricket player.
  - Dennis Lewiston, 80, cinematographer (The Rocky Horror Picture Show).
  - Benjamin Whitaker, 79, politician and global poverty campaigner, MP for Hampstead (1966–1970).
- 9 June – Rik Mayall, 56, comedian, writer and actor (The Young Ones, Bottom, The New Statesman).
- 10 June
  - Gabrielle Blunt, 95, British actress.
  - Vladimir Derer, 94, politician, founder of the Campaign for Labour Party Democracy.
  - Ian Horrocks, RAF officer.
  - Alex Wedderspoon, priest, Dean of Guildford (1987–2001).
- 12 June
  - Don Bennett, 80, cricket player and coach (Middlesex).
  - Donald Macaulay, Baron Macaulay of Bragar, 80, politician and life peer.
- 13 June
  - Willie Harvey, 84, footballer (Kilmarnock).
  - John Michael Ingram, 83, fashion designer.
- 14 June
  - Sam Kelly, 70, actor ('Allo 'Allo!, Porridge).
  - Francis Matthews, 86, film and television actor (Captain Scarlet and the Mysterons, The Revenge of Frankenstein, Dracula: Prince of Darkness).
  - Terry Richards, 81, movie actor and stuntman (Raiders of the Lost Ark, Tomorrow Never Dies).
- 15 June – John G. King, 88, physicist and professor (MIT).
- 16 June – Thérèse Vanier, 91, doctor.
- 17 June
  - Patsy Byrne, 80, actress who played Nursie in Blackadder II.
  - Jeffry Wickham, 80, actor (Ransom, The Remains of the Day, Vera Drake), President of Equity (1992–1994).
  - John Yerburgh, 91, brewery executive, Chairman of Thwaites Brewery (1966–1991).
- 18 June
  - David Cobb, 93, marine artist.
  - Philip Snell, 85, livestock breeder, chief steward for the Royal Bath and West Show.
- 19 June
  - Charlotte Greig, 59, novelist and singer.
  - Josephine Pullein-Thompson, 90, author.
  - William Reid, 87, military historian.
- 20 June
  - Jim Bamber, 66, cartoonist.
  - David Brown, 84, musicologist.
  - Handel Greville, 92, rugby union player (national team).
  - Philip Hollom, 102, ornithologist.
  - Norman Sheffield, 75, rock drummer (The Hunters), recording facility co-owner (Trident Studios) and manager (Queen).
- 21 June
  - Gerry Conlon, 60, Northern Irish author and human rights activist, Guildford Four member wrongfully convicted of the Guildford pub bombings.
  - Roland Hill, 93, journalist and biographer.
  - Anthony Jacobs, Baron Jacobs, 82, peer and automobile executive, Chairman of the BSM (1973–1990).
  - Doreen Miller, Baroness Miller of Hendon, 81, politician and life peer.
  - Sir Philip Myers, 83, police officer, Chief Constable of North Wales Police (1974–1982).
- 22 June – Felix Dennis, 67, poet and publisher, founder of Dennis Publishing
- 23 June – Euros Lewis, 72, cricketer (Glamorgan and Sussex).
- 24 June – David Taylor, 60, lawyer, Chief Executive of the SFA, General Secretary of UEFA.
- 25 June
  - Nigel Calder, 82, science writer (New Scientist) and television screenwriter, recipient of the Kalinga Prize (1972).
  - John Fantham, 75, footballer (Sheffield Wednesday).
  - Harry Hookway, 92, civil servant, Chief Executive of the British Library (1973–1984).
- 26 June – Barry Cole, 77, poet.
- 27 June
  - Jim Bullions, 90, footballer.
  - P. N. Furbank, 94, writer and literary critic.
- 28 June – Brian Roe, 75, cricketer (Somerset).
- 29 June
  - Hedley Kett, 100, World War II submariner.
  - Sir Cameron Moffat, 84, army officer and doctor, Director General Army Medical Services (1984–1987), Surgeon-General (1985–1987).
- 30 June
  - Danny Canning, 88, footballer.
  - Piers Mackesy, 89, historian.

=== July ===
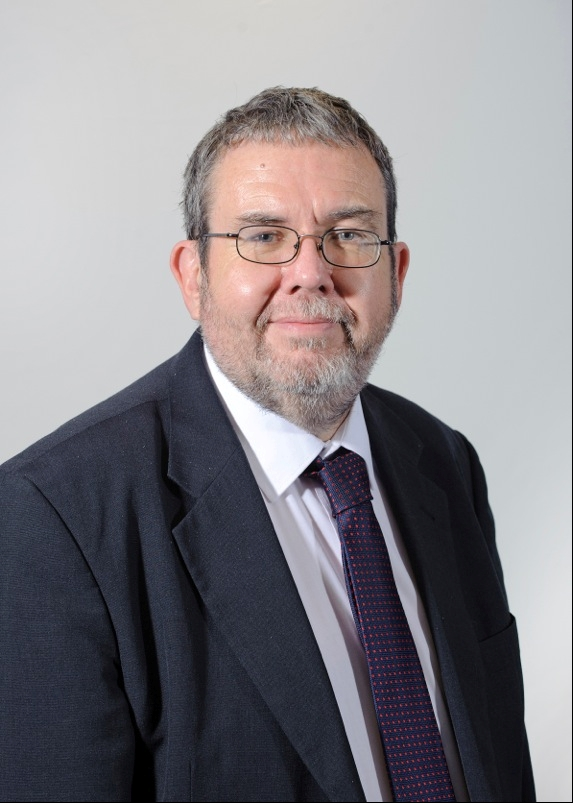
Bob Jones, West Midlands Police and Crime Commissioner

- 1 July – Bob Jones, 59, politician, the West Midlands Police and Crime Commissioner.
- 2 July
  - Errie Ball, 103, golf player, oldest Professional Golfers' Association of America member.
  - Mary Innes-Ker, Duchess of Roxburghe, 99, aristocrat.
  - Matthew Richell, 41, publisher, CEO of Hachette Australia.
- 3 July
  - Elizabeth Millicent Chilver, 99, academic administrator, Principal of Bedford College, London (1964–1971) and Lady Margaret Hall, Oxford (1971–1979).
  - Arthur Clarke, 92, sports shooter.
  - David Jones, 79, footballer (Swansea City, Yeovil Town).
  - Peter Whelan, 82, playwright (The Herbal Bed, The Accrington Pals).
- 4 July
  - Alan Alan, 87, escapologist and magician.
  - Paul Apted, 47, sound editor (The Book Thief, The Wolverine, The Fault in Our Stars).
  - Val Biro, 92, children's author, artist and illustrator.
  - Myer Fredman, 82, conductor.
- 5 July
  - Imogen Bain, 54, actress (The Phantom of the Opera, Casualty).
  - John Bone, 83, Anglican prelate, Bishop of Reading (1989–1996).
  - Elenor Gordon, 80, swimmer, first Scottish Commonwealth Games gold medalist.
  - Elsbeth Juda, 103, photographer.
  - Peter Robert Marler, 86, neurobiologist.
  - Kathy Stobart, 89, jazz saxophonist.
  - Brian Wood, 73, footballer.
- 6 July
  - Dave Bickers, 76, motocross racer and movie stuntman (Octopussy, Escape to Athena).
  - Peter Kearns, 77, footballer.
  - Dave Legeno, 50, actor (Harry Potter film series).
  - Andrew Mango, 88, BBC journalist and biographer (Mustafa Kemal Atatürk).
- 7 July
  - Sheila K. McCullagh, 93, author.
  - Howard Plumb, 42, Olympic windsurfer (1996).
  - Michael Scudamore, 81, jockey, winner of the Grand National and Cheltenham Gold Cup.
  - Anthony Smith, 88, explorer, balloonist and television presenter.
- 8 July – Tom Collings, 75, Anglican prelate, Bishop of Keewatin (1991–1996).
- 9 July
  - John Cloake, 89, diplomat, Ambassador to Bulgaria (1986–1990).
  - Robert Methuen, 7th Baron Methuen, 82, peer and politician.
  - John Spinks, 60, guitarist, singer and songwriter (The Outfield).
  - Ken Thorne, 90, television and film score composer (Superman II, Help!), Academy Award winner (A Funny Thing Happened on the Way to the Forum).
- 11 July – Ray Lonnen, 74, actor (Harry's Game, The Sandbaggers, Z-Cars).
- 13 July
  - Con Devitt, 86, trade unionist.
  - Cledan Mears, 91, Anglican clergyman, Bishop of Bangor (1982–1992).
  - Peter Sainsbury, 80, cricketer (Hampshire).
- 14 July
  - Alistair Hanna, 69, managerial consulting executive.
  - Sir Jimmy McGregor, 90, politician, member of the Executive Council of Hong Kong (1995–1997) and Legislative Council of Hong Kong (1988–1995).
- 15 July
  - Mildred Gillett, 105, local historian.
  - Lyndam Gregory, 59, television and stage actor (EastEnders, Coronation Street, Surgical Spirit).
  - John Milne, 72, broadcaster (BBC Scotland).
  - Gerallt Lloyd Owen, 69, poet.
- 16 July
  - Harriet Barber, 46, figurative painter.
  - Sir Alexander Stirling, 86, diplomat, Ambassador to Bahrain (1971–1972), Iraq (1977–1980), Tunisia (1981–1984) and Sudan (1984–1986).
- 17 July
  - J. T. Edson, 86, popular novelist.
  - Jack Lewis, Baron Lewis of Newnham, 86, politician, educator and chemist, first Warden for Robinson College.
- 18 July
  - Donald Arden, 98, Anglican prelate, Archbishop of Central Africa, Bishop of Nyasaland-Malawi.
  - Tony Dean, 65, rugby league player (Hull F.C.).
  - Sir Nick Scheele, 70, automotive manufacturing executive, President and CEO of Jaguar Cars (1992–1999) and Ford Motor Company (2001–2005).
- 19 July – Ray King, 89, footballer (Port Vale, Newcastle United).
- 20 July
  - Tony Palmer, 50s, Episcopalian bishop.
  - Lynda Patterson, 40, Anglican priest, Dean of ChristChurch Cathedral (since 2013)
- 21 July – Lettice Curtis, 99, WWII military pilot and test engineer.
- 22 July
  - John Blundell, 61, economist and policy adviser, Director General of the Institute of Economic Affairs.
  - Morris Stevenson, 71, footballer (Morton).
- 23 July
  - Dora Bryan, 91, film, television and stage actress (A Taste of Honey, Last of the Summer Wine).
  - Jordan Tabor, 23, footballer (Cheltenham).
- 24 July
  - David Broomhead, 64, mathematician.
  - Ian Rees Davies, 72, dentist and university administrator, Vice-Chancellor of the University of Hong Kong (2000–2002).
- 25 July – Richard Larter, 85, pop artist.
- 26 July – Sir Richard MacCormac, 75, modernist architect.
- 27 July
  - Sir Robin Ibbs, 88, banker, Chairman of Lloyds Bank (1993–1997).
  - Christine Oddy, 58, politician, MEP for Midlands Central (1989–1999).
- 28 July
  - Brian Eyre, 80, materials scientist.
  - Sally Farmiloe, 60, actress (Howards' Way).
  - Alex Forbes, 89, footballer (Scotland national football team)
- 29 July – Jon R. Cavaiani, 70, United States Army Special Forces sergeant major and prisoner of war, recipient of the Medal of Honor (1974).
- 30 July
  - Martin Copley, 74, conservationist (Australian Wildlife Conservancy).
  - Sir Peter Hall, 82, urban planner, academic, government adviser, and writer.
- 31 July
  - Jeff Bourne, 66, footballer (Derby County, Crystal Palace).
  - Kenny Ireland, 68, actor (Benidorm).
  - King Robbo, graffiti artist
  - Bill Walsh, 90, footballer (Sunderland).

=== August ===
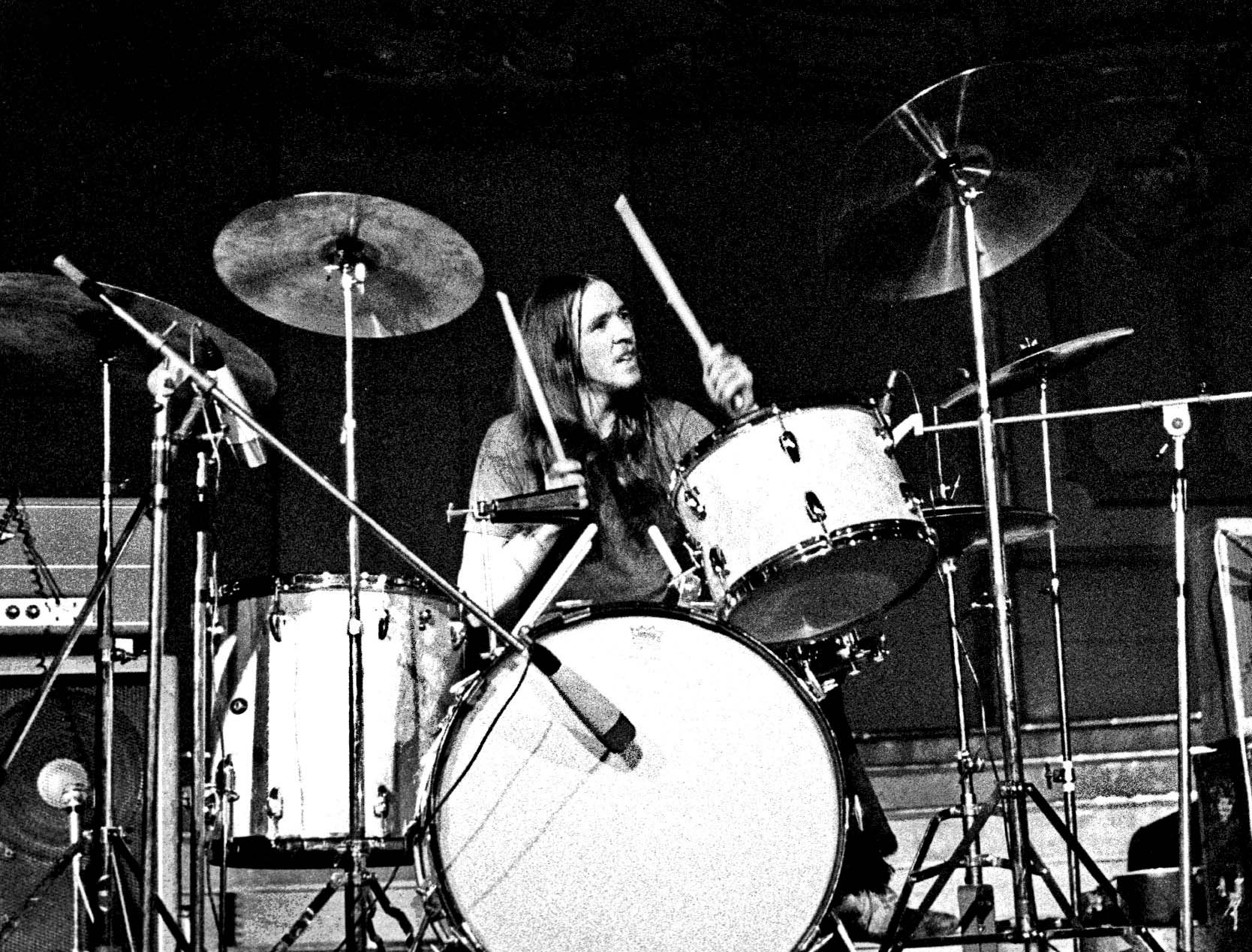
Drummer Rod de'Ath

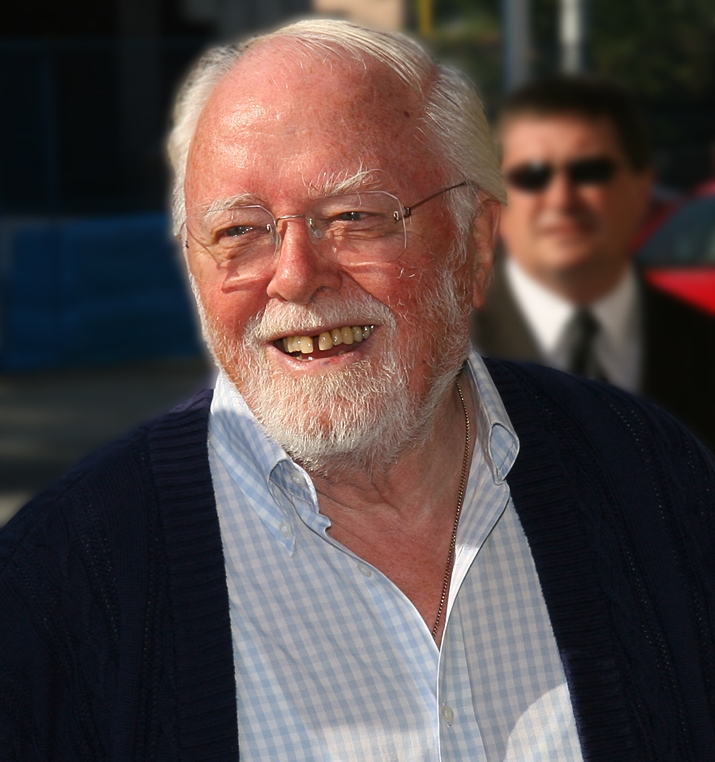
Richard Attenborough in 2007

- 1 August
  - Norman Cornish, 94, artist.
  - Rod de'Ath, 64, drummer (Rory Gallagher).
  - Mike Smith, 59, television and radio presenter (BBC Radio 1).
- 2 August – Sir Alan Peacock, 92, economist.
- 3 August
  - Tony Clunn, 68, army officer and archaeologist.
  - James McClure, 88, politician, chairman of the Democratic Unionist Party.
  - Charles Simeons, 92, politician, MP for Luton (1970–1974).
  - David Smail, 76, clinical psychologist.
- 5 August
  - Chapman Pincher, 100, journalist and historian.
  - Ronnie Stonham, 87, army officer and broadcasting adviser.
- 6 August
  - Frank Shipway, 79, conductor.
  - Jimmy Walsh, 83, footballer.
- 7 August
  - Michael Kerrigan, 61, television director.
  - Voytek, 89, television director and production designer.
- 8 August
  - Ralph Bryans, 72, motorcycle racer, Grand Prix World Champion (1965).
  - Charles Keating, 72, Emmy Award-winning actor (All My Children, Another World).
  - J. J. Murphy, 86, actor (Mickybo and Me, Angela's Ashes, Dracula Untold).
  - Simon Scott, 47, artist and musician.
- 10 August
  - Peter Chippindale, 69, newspaper journalist (The Guardian) and author.
  - Dame Kathleen Ollerenshaw, 101, mathematician and politician, Lord Mayor of Manchester (1975–1976), mentor and advisor to Margaret Thatcher.
- 11 August – Dame Julia Polak, 75, pathologist.
- 13 August
  - Laurence Mee, 63, marine scientist, director of SAMS.
  - Jean Wilks, 97, educator, headmistress of King Edward VI High School for Girls, President of HMC (1972–1974).
- 15 August
  - Timothy Cathcart, 20, rally driver.
  - Ken Hawley, 87, industrial historian.
  - Dare Wilson, 95, army general (SAS).
- 16 August – Andy MacMillan, 85, architect
- 17 August
  - Sammy Conn, 52, footballer (Airdrieonians, Falkirk).
  - Michael A. Hoey, 79, producer, director and screenwriter.
  - Nicholas Russell, 6th Earl Russell, 45, aristocrat and disability rights campaigner.
- 18 August
  - Sam Galbraith, 68, politician, MP and MSP for Strathkelvin and Bearsden.
  - James Alexander Gordon, 78, radio broadcaster (BBC Radio 5 Live).
- 19 August
  - Sam Foster, 82, politician, MLA for Fermanagh and South Tyrone (1998–2003).
  - Geoffrey Leech, 78, linguist.
  - Candida Lycett Green, 71, author.
  - Tom Pevsner, 87, film producer.
  - David St John Thomas, 84, publisher and writer.
- 21 August
  - Gerry Anderson, 69, broadcaster (BBC Northern Ireland).
  - Helen Bamber, 89, psychotherapist.
  - Don Clark, 96, footballer (Bristol City).
  - John Macklin, 66, Hispanist.
  - Jean Redpath, 77, folk singer-songwriter.
- 22 August
  - Sir Philip Dowson, 90, architect.
  - Peter Hopkirk, 83, journalist and author (The Great Game).
  - Alan Reynolds, 88, painter.
- 24 August
  - Richard Attenborough, 90, actor, film director and film producer (Gandhi, Brighton Rock, Jurassic Park, The Great Escape)
  - Alexander Monteith Currie, 86, university administrator.
- 26 August
  - Simon Featherstone, 56, diplomat, High Commissioner to Malaysia (2010–2014), Ambassador to Switzerland and Liechtenstein (2004–2008).
  - Caroline Kellett, 54, fashion journalist.
  - Sir Douglas Morpeth, 90, accountant.
  - Jim Petrie, 82, cartoonist (Minnie the Minx).
- 27 August
  - Bobby Kinloch, 79, footballer (Hibernian).
  - Jimmy Nesbitt, 79, police detective, investigated Shankill Butchers.
  - Sandy Wilson, 90, composer and lyricist (The Boy Friend).
- 28 August
  - Glenn Cornick, 67, bassist (Jethro Tull).
  - Mary Featherstonhaugh Frampton, 86, civil servant.
  - Alan Reynolds, 88, artist.
- 29 August – Sir Jasper Hollom, 96, banker, Chief Cashier of the Bank of England (1962–66), Deputy Governor of the Bank of England (1970–80).
- 30 August
  - Andrew V. McLaglen, 94, film and television director.
  - Sir David Mitchell, 86, politician, MP for Basingstoke (1964–1983) and North West Hampshire (1983–1997).
- 31 August
  - Bobbie Clarke, 74, British rock drummer.
  - John Crosslé, 82, racecar driver and manufacturer (Crosslé Car Company).
  - Jonathan Williams, 71, racing driver.

=== September ===
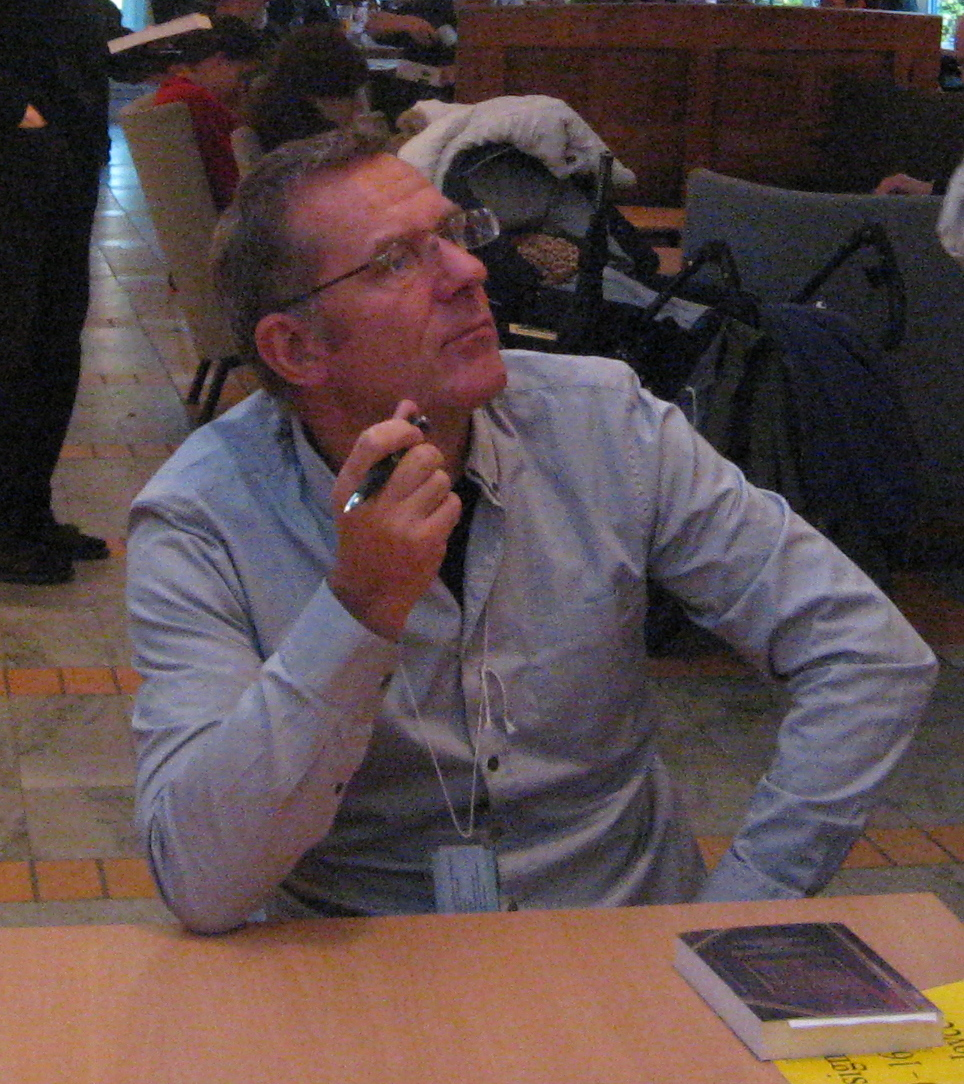
Graham Joyce

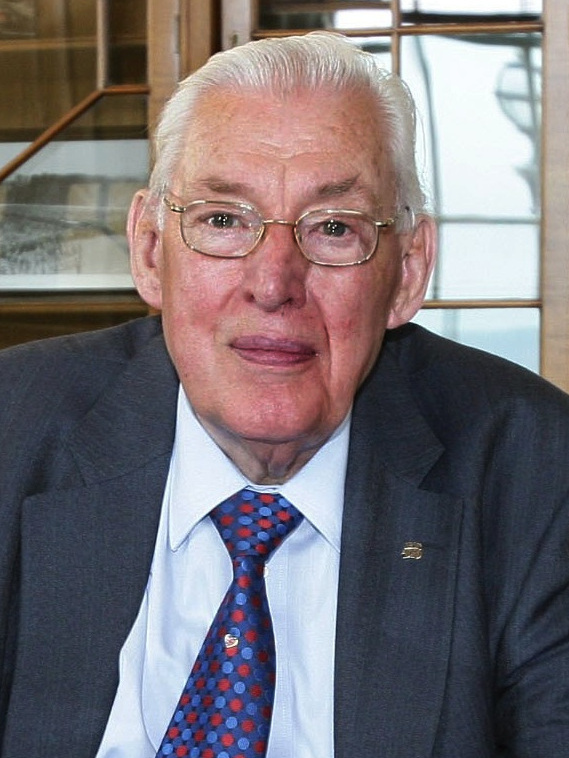
Ian Paisley

- 1 September – Hugh McGregor Ross, 97, computer scientist and theologian.
- 2 September – William Merton, 96, military scientist and banker.
- 3 September – Roy Heather, 79, television actor (Only Fools and Horses).
- 4 September
  - Clare Cathcart, 48, actress (Call the Midwife, Doctors).
  - Willie Finlay, 88, footballer (East Fife).
  - David Wynne, 88, sculptor.
- 5 September – David Lomax, 76, television reporter and interviewer (Panorama).
- 6 September
  - Jim Dobbin, 73, politician, MP for Heywood and Middleton (since 1997).
  - Martin Harrison, 65, poet
- 7 September – Frederic Mullally, 96, journalist and novelist.
- 8 September – Jane Baker, television writer (Doctor Who, Space: 1999, Watt on Earth).
- 9 September
  - Howell Evans, 86, actor (Stella).
  - Graham Joyce, 59, speculative fantasy author.
  - Antonín Tučapský, 86, composer.
  - David Whyte, 43, footballer (Charlton Athletic).
  - Robert Young, 49, guitarist (Primal Scream).
- 11 September – Sir Donald Sinden, 90, actor (The Cruel Sea, The Day of the Jackal, Two's Company).
- 12 September
  - John Bardon, 75, actor (EastEnders).
  - John Gustafson, 72, singer and bassist (Ian Gillan Band, Roxy Music, The Big Three).
  - Andrea Marongiu, drummer (Crystal Fighters).
  - Ian Paisley, 88, politician, Leader of the Democratic Unionist Party (1971–2008), First Minister (2007–2008).
  - Harold Williams, 90, football player.
- 13 September
  - David Cawthorne Haines, 44, humanitarian aid worker and ISIS hostage.
  - Nigel Walker, 97, criminologist, Wolfson Professor of Criminology.
- 14 September
  - Assheton Gorton, 84, production designer (101 Dalmatians, Legend, The French Lieutenant's Woman).
  - Angus Lennie, 84, actor (The Great Escape, Crossroads, Doctor Who).
  - E. Jennifer Monaghan, 81, historian.
  - Philip Somerville, 84, milliner.
- 15 September – Dame Peggy Fenner, 91, politician, MP for Rochester and Chatham (1970–1974, 1979–1997).
- 16 September
  - Edward Atienza, 90, actor.
  - Michael Hayes, 85, television director (Doctor Who, Z-Cars, An Age of Kings) and newsreader.
  - John Moat, 78, poet, founded the Arvon Foundation.
- 19 September
  - Robert Long, 77, army officer.
  - Iain MacCormick, 74, politician, MP for Argyll (1974–1979).
  - Derek Williams, 89, rugby union player (Cardiff).
- 21 September
  - Shirley Baker, 82, photographer.
  - Alastair Reid, 88, poet and scholar.
  - Pete Shutler, 68, folk musician (The Yetties).
- 22 September
  - E. J. Mishan, 96, economist.
  - Billy Neil, 75, footballer (Queen's Park, Airdrieonians).
- 23 September – John Divers, 74, footballer.
- 24 September
  - Christopher Hogwood, 73, conductor.
  - Deborah Cavendish, Duchess of Devonshire, 94.
  - Sir Edward Eveleigh, 96, judge, Lord Justice of Appeal and Privy Councillor.
  - Sir Gordon Manzie, 84, civil servant, Chief Executive of the Property Services Agency.
  - Karl Miller, 83, literary editor (The Listener, London Review of Books).
  - Hugh C. Rae, 78, author.
  - Derek Roe, archaeologist.
- 25 September
  - Toby Balding, 78, racehorse trainer.
  - Stephen Sykes, 75, Anglican prelate, Bishop of Ely (1990–1999).
  - Dorothy Tyler-Odam, 94, athlete, Olympic silver medalist (1936, 1948).
- 26 September – Maggie Stables, actress (Doctor Who).
- 27 September
  - Anna Morpurgo Davies, 77, philologist.
  - Michael Scott-Joynt, 71, Anglican prelate, Bishop of Stafford (1987–1995) and Winchester (1995–2011).
- 28 September
  - Dannie Abse, 91, doctor and poet.
  - Sheila Faith, 86, politician, MP for Belper (1979–1983).
  - Paul Fatt, 90, neuroscientist.
  - Tim Rawlings, 81, footballer.
- 29 September
  - Mary Cadogan, 86, writer.
  - Len Stephenson, 84, footballer.
- 30 September
  - Ralph Cosham, 78, actor and book narrator.
  - Sheila Tracy, 80, broadcaster and musician (Big Band Special).

=== October ===
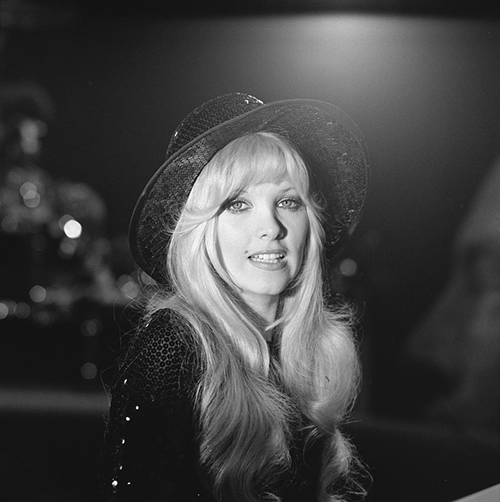
Lynsey de Paul in 1974

- 1 October
  - Lynsey de Paul, 64, singer-songwriter ("Won't Somebody Dance with Me").
  - Sir Maurice Hodgson, 94, business executive.
  - George Savage, 72, politician, MLA for Upper Bann (1998–2003, 2007–2011).
- 2 October
  - Robb Skipper, 28, rock musician (The Holloways).
  - The Spaceape, poet and DJ.
- 3 October
  - Michael Allenby, 3rd Viscount Allenby, 83, aristocrat and politician.
  - Alan Henning, 47, humanitarian aid worker and ISIS hostage.
- 5 October
  - John Best, 74, footballer and manager.
  - David Chavchavadze, 90, author and CIA officer.
  - Philip Howard, 80, journalist (The Times)
  - Ronnie Spafford, 86, army officer and philatelist.
  - David Watson, 74, actor (Beneath the Planet of the Apes).
- 6 October – Andrew Kerr, 80, festival organizer (Glastonbury Festival).
- 7 October
  - Richard Laws, 88, zoologist, Master of St Edmund's College, Cambridge (1985–1996).
  - Angus Macleod, 63, journalist and editor.
  - David Samuel, 3rd Viscount Samuel, 92, scientist and peer.
  - Ivor Wilks, 86, historian.
- 9 October
  - Les Angell, 92, cricketer (Somerset).
  - Sir Sydney Chapman, 78, politician and architect, MP for Birmingham Handsworth (1970–1974) and Chipping Barnet (1979–2005).
  - Tony Priday, 92, bridge player.
  - David Rayvern Allen, 76, cricket historian.
  - Merton Sandler, 88, chemical pathologist.
  - Sir Jocelyn Stevens, 82, publishing executive.
  - Victor Winding, 85, actor (Doctor Who, Frightmare)
- 10 October
  - Roy Law, 77, footballer (Wimbledon).
  - John Westcott, 93, computer scientist.
- 11 October – Brian Lemon, 77, jazz pianist.
- 12 October
  - Tony Hibbert, 96, army officer.
  - Tony Lynes, 85, anti-poverty campaigner.
  - Graham Miles, 73, snooker player.
- 13 October
  - Mark Bell, 43, musician and house music producer (LFO).
  - Sir John Bradfield, 89, biologist and entrepreneur, founder of Cambridge Science Park.
  - Patricia Carson, 85, historian and author.
- 14 October
  - Lady Mary Downer, 89, Australian philanthropist, mother of the Australian High Commissioner.
  - A. H. Halsey, 91, sociologist.
  - Oriel Malet, 91, novelist.
  - Agnes Owens, 88, author.
- 15 October – Sir Christopher Staughton, 81, judge, Lord Justice of Appeal, President of the Court of Appeal of Gibraltar (2005–2006).
- 16 October
  - Clive Beer-Jones, 65, musician (Black Widow).
  - John Spencer-Churchill, 11th Duke of Marlborough, 88, aristocrat.
- 17 October
  - John Andrew, 83, Anglican priest.
  - Hermione Hobhouse, 80, architectural historian.

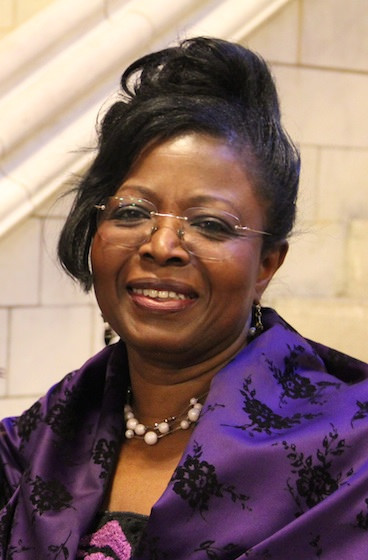
Efua Dorkenoo

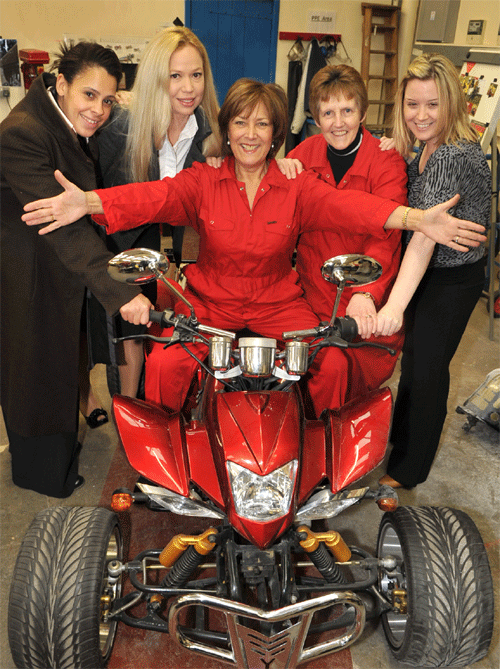
Lynda Bellingham

- 18 October
  - Robert Barbour, 93, Church of Scotland minister and author.
  - Mick Burt, 76, drummer (Chas & Dave).
  - Efua Dorkenoo, 65, campaigner against female genital mutilation.
  - Kenneth House, 78, cricket player (Dorset).
  - Mervyn Winfield, 81, cricket player (Nottinghamshire).
- 19 October
  - Lynda Bellingham, 66, actress (Doctor Who, General Hospital, The Bill).
  - Kathryn M Chaloner, 60, statistician, Professor of Biostatistics at the University of Iowa.
  - Stuart Gallacher, 68, rugby player (Wales national union and league teams) and executive.
  - Arnold Mitchell, 84, footballer (Exeter City).
  - Don Ratcliffe, 79, footballer (Stoke City).
  - Raphael Ravenscroft, 60, saxophonist ("Baker Street") and author.
- 20 October
  - Rodney Fitch, 76, designer.
  - Sir John Hoskyns, 87, businessman, policy advisor to Margaret Thatcher.
  - John Solomon, 82, croquet player.
- 21 October
  - Shirley Baker, 82, photographer.
  - Jim Barrett, Jr., 83, footballer (West Ham).
- 22 October
  - Elizabeth Forbes, 90, writer and musicologist.
  - George Francis, 80, footballer (Brentford).
  - John Postgate, 93, microbiologist and writer, professor at University of Sussex.
  - Sonia Rolt, 95, canal conservationist.
- 23 October
  - Sir Ronald Grierson, 93, banker.
  - Bernard Mayes, 85, broadcaster and academic.
  - David Redfern, 78, photographer.
  - Alvin Stardust, 72, singer ("My Coo Ca Choo").
  - Raleigh Trevelyan, 91, author.
- 24 October
  - Vic Ash, 84, jazz saxophonist and clarinetist.
  - Martin Garratt, 34, footballer.
  - Gordon MacWilliam, 91, Anglican priest.
  - Malcolm Thompson, 68, footballer (Scarborough).
- 25 October
  - Jack Bruce, 71, bassist (Cream, Manfred Mann) and composer.
  - Peter Maxey, 83, diplomat, Ambassador to the United Nations (1984–1986).
  - David Somerset, 84, banker, Chief Cashier of the Bank of England (1980–1988).
- 26 October
  - Vic Allen, 91, academic, sociologist, historian and trade unionist (NUM).
  - Dudley Knowles, 67, philosopher.
- 27 October – Charles McCullough, 91, politician, member of the Senate of Northern Ireland (1968–1972).
- 28 October
  - David Trendell, 50, organist and musical director.
  - Charlie Watkins, 91, audio engineer (Watkins Electric Music).
- 30 October
  - Renée Asherson, 99, actress.
  - Joe Brown, 85, football player and manager (Burnley).
  - Geoffrey Clarke, 89, artist.
  - Christopher J. Turner, 81, diplomat, Governor of the Turks and Caicos Islands (1982–1987) and Montserrat (1987–1990).
- 31 October
  - Ian Fraser, 81, composer and conductor (Scrooge, Christmas in Washington).
  - Sir Henry Harris, 89, cell biologist.
  - Pat Partridge, 81, football referee.

=== November ===
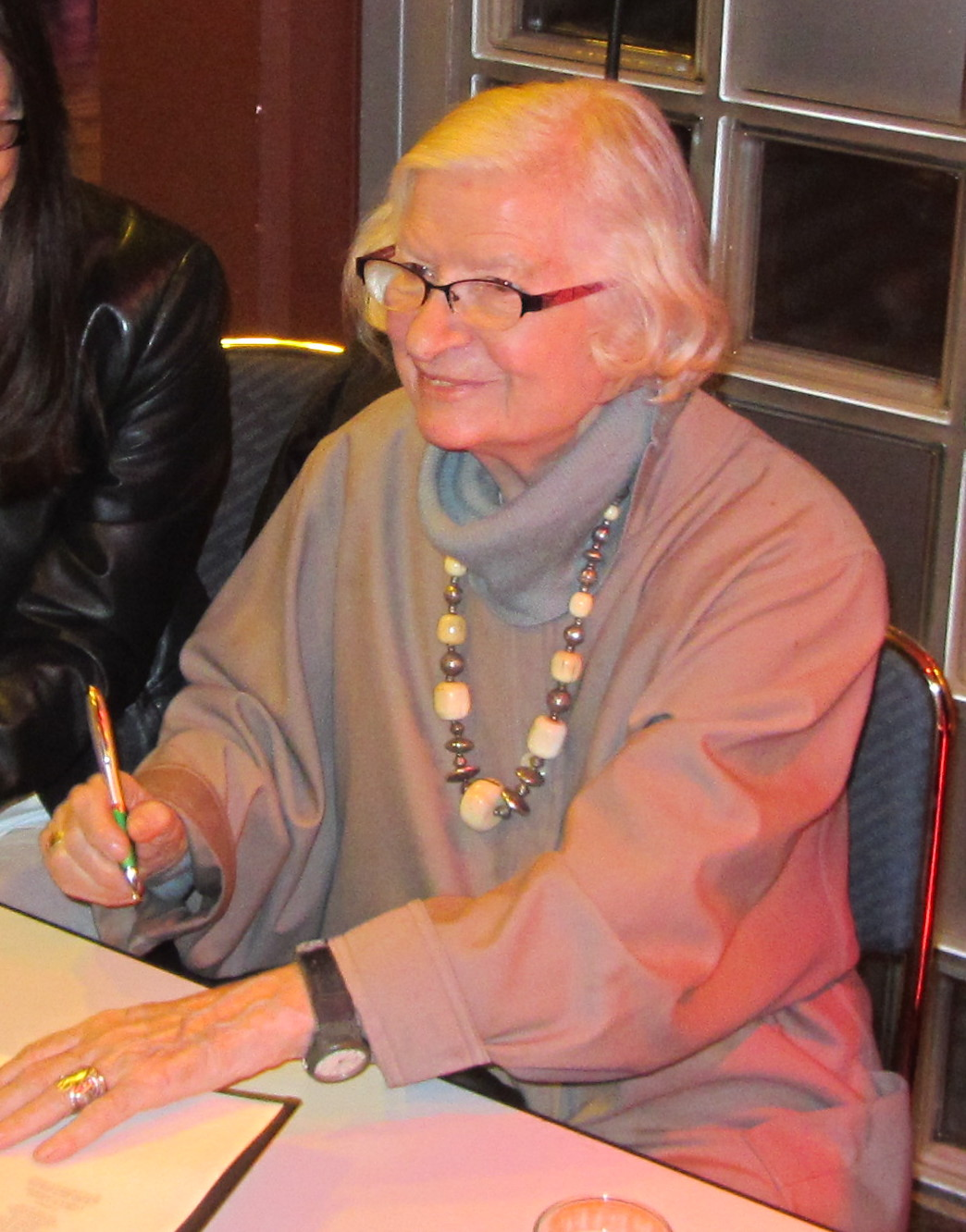
P. D. James in 2013

- 1 November
  - Joel Barnett, Baron Barnett, 91, politician, MP for Heywood and Royton (1964–1983), Chief Secretary to the Treasury (1974–1979).
  - Anne Cluysenaar, 78, poet and writer.
  - Sheila Shulman, 77, rabbi.
- 2 November
  - Acker Bilk, 85, jazz clarinetist ("Stranger on the Shore").
  - G. L. Harriss, 89, medieval historian.
- 3 November
  - Geoff Cox, 79, footballer (Torquay United). (death announced on this date)
  - Ivor Seemley, 85, footballer (Sheffield Wednesday, Stockport County, Chesterfield).
- 4 November
  - Colin Docker, 88, Anglican clergyman, Bishop of Horsham (1975–1991).
  - Derek Hogg, 84, footballer (Leicester City).
  - Gerard W. Hughes, 90, Jesuit priest and writer, Chaplain of University of Glasgow (1967–1975).
  - Mervyn Winfield, 81, cricket player (Nottinghamshire).
- 5 November – Roy Hartle, 83, footballer (Bolton Wanderers).
- 6 November
  - Maggie Boyle, 57, folk singer.
  - Sir Tommy Macpherson, 94, British Army officer and businessman.
  - Sir Anthony Reeve, 76, diplomat, Ambassador to Jordan (1988–1991), Ambassador to South Africa (1991–1994), High Commissioner to South Africa (1994–1996).
- 7 November
  - Alex Bain, 78, footballer (Motherwell, Huddersfield Town, Falkirk). (death announced on this date)
  - Bill Green, 97, Battle of Britain fighter pilot.
  - Francis Harvey, 89, poet.
  - Ian Michael, 99, academic, Vice-Chancellor of the University of Malawi (1964–1973).
  - Dan Samuel, 4th Viscount Samuel, 89, businessman and peer.
- 8 November
  - Audrey White, 87, model and author.
  - Sammy Wilson, 82, footballer (Celtic).
- 9 November – Sammy Reid, 75, footballer (Motherwell, Berwick Rangers).
- 10 November
  - Brian Farrell, 85, broadcaster and journalist.
  - Sally Hardcastle, 69, broadcaster, (Woman's Hour and The World Tonight).
- 12 November
  - Warren Clarke, 67, actor (Dalziel and Pascoe, A Clockwork Orange, Top Secret!).
  - Rebekah Gibbs, 41, actress (Casualty).
  - David Mackay, 80, architect.
  - Richard Pasco, 88, actor (Yesterday's Enemy, Rasputin the Mad Monk, Mrs. Brown).
  - Bernard Stonehouse, 88, polar scientist (Stonehouse Bay, Mount Stonehouse).
- 13 November
  - Mike Burney, 70, saxophonist (Wizzard).
  - Sir William Dugdale, 92, football executive and peer, Chairman of Aston Villa (1975–1982).
  - Dennis Elwell, 84, astrologer.
  - Reg Parker, 87, rugby league player and international coach.
  - Jim Storrie, 74, footballer (Leeds United).
- 14 November – Paul Vaughan, 89, journalist.
- 15 November
  - Jack Bridger Chalker, 96, World War II artist.
  - Dame Mary Glen-Haig, 96, Olympic fencer.
- 19 November
  - Roy Bhaskar, 70, philosopher.
  - Jon Stallworthy, 79, academic, poet and literary critic.
- 20 November
  - Arthur Butterworth, 91, composer and conductor.
  - Iain Hesford, 54, footballer (Blackpool, Sunderland).
- 21 November
  - Sir Robert Richardson, 85, army general.
  - Sir John Sutton, 82, RAF officer, Lieutenant Governor of Jersey (1990–1995).
- 22 November
  - Margaret Aston, 82, historian.
  - Frank Caldwell, 93, army general, Assistant Chief of the General Staff (1972–1974).
- 23 November
  - Anne Cowdrey, 14th Lady Herries of Terregles, 76, racehorse trainer.
  - Mark Keyworth, 66, rugby union player (Swansea, national team).
  - John Neal, 82, football player and manager (Wrexham, Middlesbrough, Chelsea).
  - Clive Palmer, 71, folk musician (The Incredible String Band).
  - David Stoddart, 77, geographer.
- 24 November – Reg Foulkes, 91, footballer (Norwich City).
- 25 November
  - Joanna Dunham, 78, actress (The Greatest Story Ever Told).
  - Peter Wescombe, 82, diplomat and co-founder of Bletchley Park Trust.
- 26 November
  - Sir Arthur Bonsall, 97, civil servant, Director of GCHQ (1973–1978).
  - Malcolm Finlayson, 84, footballer (Wolverhampton Wanderers).
  - Frankie Fraser, 90, gangster.
  - Arthur Montford, 85, football commentator.
  - Peter Underwood, 91, author, broadcaster and paranormalist.
- 27 November
  - P. D. James, 94, crime novelist (The Children of Men, Death Comes to Pemberley).
  - Jack Kyle, 88, rugby union player and surgeon.
- 30 November
  - Sir Fred Catherwood, 89, politician and Christian writer, MEP (1979–1994).
  - Ann Paludan, 86, author.
  - Elizabeth Young, Baroness Kennet, 91, journalist and author.

=== December ===
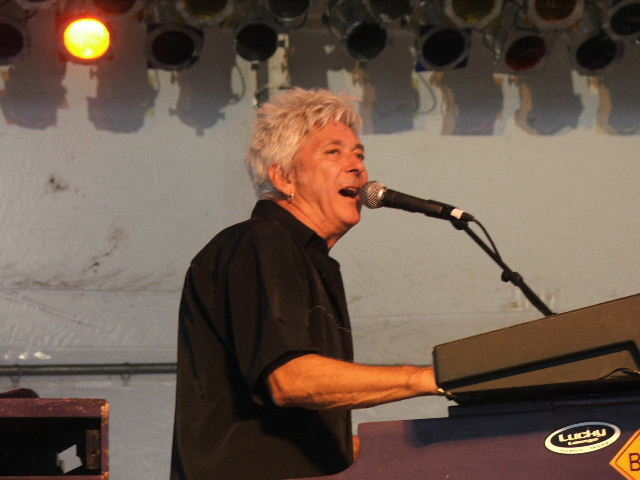
Ian McLagan in 2006

- 1 December
  - David Cooke, 59, admiral, Commander Operations (2006–2009).
  - Jimmy Duncan, 83, footballer (Celtic).
- 2 December
  - Josie Cichockyj, 50, wheelchair basketball player.
  - Gerry Fisher, 88, cinematographer (Wise Blood, The Go-Between, Fedora).
  - Peter Furneaux, 79, football club chairman and investor (Grimsby Town).
  - John Kotz, 84, politician, Mayor of Hackney.
- 3 December – Ian McLagan, 69, keyboard player (Small Faces).
- 4 December
  - Nick Talbot, 37, singer-songwriter (Gravenhurst).
  - Jeremy Thorpe, 85, politician, Leader of the Liberal Party (1967–1976), MP for North Devon (1959–1979) (Thorpe affair).
- 6 December – Luke Somers, 33, photojournalist and AQAP hostage.
- 7 December
  - Norman Mair, 86, rugby union player and journalist.
  - Tommy Todd, 88, footballer (Airdrie, Hamilton, Crewe, Derby and Rochdale).
- 8 December
  - James Brown, 83, cricket player.
  - Scot Young, 52, businessman and reality television personality (Ladies of London).
- 9 December
  - Lydia Mordkovitch, 70, violinist.
  - Sheila Stewart, 77, singer, storyteller, and author.
- 10 December
  - Catherine Hughes, 81, diplomat and academic.
  - Caroline Ludlow, 67, judge.
- 11 December
  - Tom Adams, 76, actor (The Great Escape, Licensed to Kill, Doctor Who).
  - Tim Black, 77, family planning pioneer, founder of Marie Stopes International.
  - Philip Knights, Baron Knights, 94, police officer and peer, Chief Constable of the West Midlands (1975–1985).
- 12 December
  - John Baxter, 78, footballer (Hibernian).
  - Ivor Grattan-Guinness, 73, historian of mathematics and logic.
  - Dave West, 70, businessman.
- 14 December – Bobo Faulkner, 73, English model and television personality.
- 15 December
  - Michael Hare Duke, 89, Anglican bishop.
  - Ray Steadman-Allen, 92, composer and Salvation Army officer.
- 16 December
  - Martin Brasier, 67, palaeobiologist and astrobiologist.
  - Brian Lister, 88, race car builder (Lister Cars).
- 17 December – Neil James, 53, rugby league player.
- 18 December – Mandy Rice-Davies, 70, model, figure in the Profumo affair.
- 19 December
  - Philip Bradbourn, 63, politician, MEP for West Midlands (since 1999).
  - Jamie Gilroy, 66, politician, co-founder of the Wickerman Festival.
  - Pat Holton, 78, footballer (Motherwell, Hamilton Academical).
  - Colin Strang, 2nd Baron Strang, 92, philosopher and peer.
- 20 December
  - Joe Anderson, 86, rugby league player (Castleford, Leeds, Featherstone Rovers).
  - Donald Charlton Bradley, 90, chemist.
  - John Freeman, 99, politician, journalist, broadcaster and diplomat, MP for Watford (1945–1955), Ambassador to the United States (1969–1971).
  - Ranulph Glanville, 68, architect and cybernetician.
  - Brian Manley, 85, engineer and scientist.
  - Sam Morris, 84, footballer (Chester City).
- 21 December
  - Jane Bown, 89, photographer (The Observer).
  - Sonya Butt, 90, Special Operations Executive agent.
  - Roberta Leigh, 87, author and television producer (Space Patrol).
  - Billie Whitelaw, 82, actress (The Omen, The Dark Crystal, Hot Fuzz).
  - Alan Williams, 84, politician, MP for Swansea West (1964–2010), Father of the House (2005–2010).
- 22 December
  - Joe Cocker, 70, rock and blues singer ("With a Little Help from My Friends", "You Are So Beautiful", "Up Where We Belong").
  - Christopher Davidge, 85, rower.
  - William J. Fishman, 93, academic.
  - Richard Graydon, 92, stuntman and stunt coordinator (James Bond film series).
  - Jeremy Lloyd, 84, screenwriter (Are You Being Served?, 'Allo 'Allo!).
  - Rosemary Lowe-McConnell, 93, biologist and ichthyologist.
- 23 December
  - Mike Elliott, 68, comedian and actor (Goal!, Billy Elliot).
  - Jeremy Lloyd, 84, actor and screenwriter
  - Debbie Purdy, 51, activist.
- 24 December
  - Jacqueline Briskin, 87, author.
  - Arthur Louis, 64, reggae cross-over musician ("Knockin' on Heaven's Door").
  - Barry Williams, 70, spree killer.
- 25 December
  - Bernard Kay, 86, actor (Doctor Who, Doctor Zhivago).
  - Mary F. Lyon, 89, geneticist.
  - David Ryall, 79, actor.
  - Tony Wilkinson, 66, archaeologist.
- 26 December
  - Geoff Pullar, 79, cricketer.
  - Ken Riddington, television producer (House of Cards).
  - Jean Stogdon, 86, social worker and campaigner (Grandparents Plus).
  - Andrew Thomson, 78, academic and historian.
- 27 December
  - Ron Henry, 80, footballer (Tottenham Hotspur, national team).
  - Carol Stone, 60, transgender priest.
  - Bridget Turner, 75, actress (Doctor Who, Casualty, Z-Cars).
- 29 December
  - Dorrit Dekk, 97, graphic designer.
  - Leslie Silver, 89, Chairman of Leeds United F.C. (1983–1966).
- 30 December
  - Frank Atkinson, 90, museum director (Beamish Museum).
  - Deborah Bone, 51, mental health nurse, inspired Disco 2000.
  - Derek Coombs, 83, British politician, MP for Birmingham Yardley (1970–1974).
  - Yolande Donlan, 94, actress.
  - Jim Galloway, 78, jazz clarinet and saxophone player.
  - Patrick Gowers, 78, composer.
  - Luise Rainer, 104, actress.
- 31 December
  - Jimmy Dunn, 91, footballer (Wolverhampton Wanderers, Derby County).
  - Michael Kennedy, 88, biographer, journalist and music critic.
  - Valerian Wellesley, 8th Duke of Wellington, 99, peer and army officer.

== See also ==
- 2014 in British music
- 2014 in British television
- 2014 in England
- 2014 in Northern Ireland
- 2014 in Scotland
- 2014 in Wales
- List of British films of 2014
