= John Kotz =

John Kotz may refer to:

- John Kotz (basketball) (1919–1999), American basketball player
- John Kotz (politician) (1930–2014), British Labour politician
