= Angus Macleod (journalist) =

British journalist and editor (1951–2014)

Angus Macleod (13 May 1951 – 7 October 2014) was a British journalist and editor from Scotland. He was born in Stornoway on Lewis in 1951, the son of a Harris Tweed mill worker. After studying at The University of Edinburgh he worked for The Scotsman newspaper. During his career he worked at the Sunday Mail, Scottish Daily Express, and latterly as Scottish editor of The Times.
