= Squishy McFluff: The Invisible Cat! =

Children's chapter book by Pip Jones and Ella Okstad

- Author: Pip Jones
- Illustrator: Ella Okstad
- Cover artist: Okstad
- Language: English
- Genre: Children's chapter book
- Published: 2014 (Faber & Faber)
- Publication place: England
- Media type: Print (paperback)
- Pages: 68
- ISBN: 9780571302505
- OCLC: 1230299588

Squishy McFluff: The Invisible Cat! is a 2014 children's chapter book by Pip Jones and illustrated by Ella Okstad. Published by Faber and Faber, it is about a little girl called Ava and her invisible friend, a cat called Squishy McFluff, who initially causes trouble around the family home but eventually learns to behave.

== Publication history ==
- 2017, USA, Paw Prints ISBN 9781518250651
- 2014, England, Faber & Faber ISBN 9780571302505

== Reception ==
A review in Booklist of Squishy McFluff wrote "This playful early chapter book will attract emergent readers with its rhyming text, widely spaced lines, and sweet red-and-blue illustrations.", and Publishers Weekly called it "a punchy rhyming escapade".

Squishy McFluff has also been reviewed by the following book reviewers: Kirkus Reviews, School Library Journal, and Booktrust.

It won the 2012 Greenhouse Funny Prize.
