= Gordon Bowra =

British surgeon

Gordon Trevor Bowra (28 June 1936 - 18 February 2014) was a British surgeon who was medical officer with the British Antarctic Survey in 1963. He was awarded the Polar Medal in 1971.
