= Kenneth House =

English cricketer

Kenneth House (7 April 1936 – 18 October 2014) was an English cricketer. He was a right-handed batsman and a right-arm medium-fast bowler who played for Dorset. He was born in Sturminster Newton, Dorset.

Having made his Minor Counties Championship debut in 1962, House made a single List A appearance, in the 1973 Gillette Cup. From the opening order, he scored 15 runs, as the team collapsed to a 79-run defeat.
