= John Kotz (politician) =

British politician

John Kotz (1930 – 11 November 2014) was a British Labour Party politician who became the mayor and leader of Hackney. His autobiography was Vintage red.
