= Deaths in March 2014 =

The following is a list of notable deaths in March 2014.

Entries for each day are listed alphabetically by surname. A typical entry lists information in the following sequence:

- Name, age, country of citizenship and reason for notability, established cause of death, reference.

== March 2014 ==
=== 1 ===
- Khandokar Mahbub Uddin Ahmad, 88, Bangladeshi politician.
- Ann Kiemel Anderson, 68, American religious speaker and author, cancer.
- Jean Caplin, 84, English Olympic swimmer.
- G. K. Chadha, 73, Indian economist, heart attack.
- Nancy Charest, 54, Canadian politician, Quebec MNA for Matane (2003–2007), hypothermia.
- J. W. Cole, 86, American football coach and player.
- Prafulla Dahanukar, 80, Indian painter.
- Dayuma, Huaorani convert to Christianity.
- A. Richard Diebold Jr., 80, American linguistic anthropologist.
- Philippe Ebly, 93, Belgian science fiction and fantasy writer.
- Andy Gilpin, 93, Canadian Olympic champion ice hockey player (1948).
- Zdeněk Hajný, 72, Czech artist.
- Alan Heyman, 82, American-born South Korean traditional music scholar.
- Eckart Höfling, 77, German Catholic priest and missionary.
- Bangaru Laxman, 74, Indian politician, President of the Bharatiya Janata Party (2000–2001), cardiac arrest.
- Les Layton, 92, American baseball player (New York Giants).
- Donald Mahley, 71, American diplomat and army officer, representative to the Organisation for the Prohibition of Chemical Weapons, pancreatic cancer.
- Dave O'Brien, 57, American collegiate athletic director (Long Beach State, Temple, Northeastern), cancer.
- Dimitrios Pappos, 74, Greek Olympic skier.
- Alain Resnais, 91, French film director (Night and Fog, Hiroshima mon amour).
- Tommy Ed Roberts, 73, American politician, member of the Alabama House of Representatives (1974–1978) and Senate (1994–2006).
- Robert L. Spencer, 94, American fashion designer, heart attack.
- Paul Tant, 68, Belgian politician, Mayor of Kruishoutem (1977–2009).
- Barry B. Thompson, 77, American academic.
- Gyula Tóth, 72, Hungarian footballer.
- Werner Uebelmann, 92, Swiss entrepreneur and writer.
- John Wilkinson, 73, British politician, MP for Bradford West (1970–1974) and Ruislip-Northwood (1979–2005).
- Alejandro Zaffaroni, 91, Uruguayan-born American chemist and entrepreneur, dementia.

=== 2 ===
- Ryhor Baradulin, 79, Belarusian poet.
- Peter Bares, 78, German organist and composer.
- Ted Bergmann, 93, American sports television and entertainment producer (NBC), complications following surgery.
- Molly Bobak, 94, Canadian war artist, recipient of the Order of Canada (1995).
- Bhuvnesh Chaturvedi, 85, Indian politician, State Minister (1993–1996), MP (1978–1996) and Rajasthan MLA for Kota (1972–1977).
- Porky Chedwick, 96, American radio announcer.
- Sal DeRosa, 82, Italian-born American soccer coach.
- Gail Gilmore, 76, Canadian actress, lung cancer.
- Stanley Grinstein, 86, American businessman, kidney disease.
- Jacob Jervell, 88, Norwegian theologian, priest and author.
- Justin Kaplan, 88, American biographer, Pulitzer Prize winner for Biography or Autobiography (1967), Parkinson's disease.
- Benjamin Lambert, 77, American politician, member of the Virginia House of Delegates (1978–1986) and Senate (1986–2008).
- John Cyril Malloy, 83, American politician.
- Rudolph Rummel, 81, American political scientist.
- Stanley Rubin, 96, American film and television producer (Revenge, Bracken's World, The Ghost & Mrs. Muir).
- Clément Sagna, 71, Senegalese Olympic athlete.
- Norman Scarfe, 90, English historian.
- Scott Vanstone, 66, Canadian cryptographer, cancer.

=== 3 ===
- Ali Anwar, 79, Bangladeshi litterateur and translator.
- Robert Ashley, 83, American composer, complications from cirrhosis.
- Christine Buchegger, 71, Austrian actress, complications from surgery.
- George Caldwell, 81, American politician.
- Martin Gutzwiller, 88, Swiss-born American physicist.
- Bridget Hyem, 80, Australian Olympic equestrian.
- Stan Koziol, 48, American soccer player, leukemia.
- Kurt Chew-Een Lee, 88, American military officer, first Asian-American officer in the Marine Corps, recipient of the Navy Cross, suspected heart attack.
- Curtis McClarin, 44, American actor (The Happening, Law & Order), brain aneurysm.
- Harold Mowery, 84, American politician, member of the Pennsylvania House of Representatives (1976–1990) and Senate (1993–2004), pneumonia.
- Sherwin B. Nuland, 83, American National Book Award-winning author and surgeon, prostate cancer.
- F. Edward Osborne, 89, American politician, member of the Idaho House of Representatives (1989–1990) and Senate (1991–1992).
- William Pogue, 84, American astronaut (Skylab) and Air Force pilot (Thunderbirds).
- Juan A. Rivero, 90, American Puerto Rican biologist, founder of the Dr. Juan A. Rivero Zoo, cancer.
- Billy Robinson, 74, British wrestler and trainer.
- Joab Thomas, 81, American university administrator, Chancellor of NC State (1975–1981), President of the University of Alabama (1981–1988) and Penn State (1990–1995).
- Aino-Maija Tikkanen, 86, Finnish actress (The Harvest Month, Mother of Mine), recipient of the Order of the Lion of Finland (1983).
- Xu Chongde, 85, Chinese political scientist and professor.
- Shōji Yasui, 85, Japanese actor (The Burmese Harp).

=== 4 ===
- Veronica Anstey, 79, English amateur golfer.
- Geneva G. Belford, 81, American computer scientist.
- Richard W. Burkhardt, 95, American academic, President of Ball State University (1978).
- Gary Carson, 64, American poker player, academic and author, complications from vascular and renal disease.
- Jack Christie, 89, New Zealand musician.
- Renato Cioni, 84, Italian operatic tenor.
- Barrie Cooke, 83, English-born Irish artist.
- Hollie Donan, 85, American football player.
- László Fekete, 59, Hungarian footballer.
- Mark Freidkin, 60, Russian writer.
- Lawrence Patrick Henry, 79, South African Roman Catholic prelate, Archbishop of Cape Town (1990–2009).
- Dame Elaine Kellett-Bowman, 90, British politician and barrister, MP for Lancaster (1970–1997) and MEP (1975–1984).
- Jack Kinzler, 94, American aeronautical engineer, NASA technical director that helped save Skylab.
- Chuck Kress, 92, American baseball player (Chicago White Sox).
- John Wayne Mason, 90, American physiologist.
- Maja Petrin, 41, Croatian television and stage actress, heart failure.
- Boris Pustyntsev, 78, Russian human rights activist.
- Joan Rankin, 86, Canadian artist.
- Wu Tianming, 74, Chinese film director and producer, heart attack.

=== 5 ===
- Nana Abdullahi, 54, Nigerian judge, first female High Court judge in Jigawa (since 2010).
- bartcop, 60, American blogger.
- Iain Donald Campbell, 72, Scottish biophysicist.
- Deep, Punjabi-American rap artist.
- Sir Robin Dunn, 96, British jurist, Lord Justice of Appeal (1980–1984).
- Geoff Edwards, 83, American game show host (Starcade, Treasure Hunt) and actor (Petticoat Junction), pneumonia.
- John Uzzell Edwards, 79, British painter.
- Nigel Groom, 89, British author and perfume connoisseur.
- Eli Hunt, 60, American Ojibwe politician, tribal chairman of Leech Lake Band (1996–2002).
- Scott Kalvert, 49, American director (The Basketball Diaries), suicide.
- Little Bridge, 8, New Zealand racehorse, colic.
- Ernest Anthony Lowe, 85, British economist.
- Alexander Macdonald, 95, Canadian politician, MP (1957–1958).
- Ailsa McKay, 50, Scottish economist and government policy advisor, cancer.
- Buck Melton, 90, American politician, author and lawyer, Mayor of Macon, Georgia (1975–1979).
- Leopoldo María Panero, 65, Spanish poet.
- Hank Rieger, 95, American television executive, President of the Academy of Television Arts and Sciences (1973–1975, 1977–1980).
- Ros Saboeut, 72, Cambodian musician activist and film subject, complications from a fall.
- Dave Sampson, 73, English rock singer.
- Dov Schperling, 76, Latvian-born Israeli Zionist activist.
- Luis Villoro, 91, Spanish-born Mexican philosopher and writer.

=== 6 ===
- Joe Abbey, 88, American football player (Chicago Bears).
- Alemayehu Atomsa, 45, Ethiopian politician, President of Oromia Region (2010–2014), typhoid fever.
- Jean-Louis Bertucelli, 71, French film director (Ramparts of Clay, Docteur Françoise Gailland).
- Christian Casadesus, 101, French actor.
- Viking Olver Eriksen, 91, Norwegian nuclear physicist.
- Maurice Faure, 92, French politician and diplomat, Interior Minister, Justice Minister, MP and Senator for Lot, last living signatory of the Treaty of Rome.
- Jack Finlay, 92, American football player (Los Angeles Rams).
- Martin Gottfried, 80, American drama critic and biographer, complications from pneumonia.
- Sérgio Guerra, 66, Brazilian economist and politician, member of the Federal Senate (2003–2011), lung cancer.
- Sven Hansell, 79, American musicologist.
- Tony Herbert, 93, Irish politician (14th & 16th Senator) and hurler (Limerick).
- Antonio Hidalgo, 71, Spanish footballer (Celta Vigo).
- Gregory L. Hillhouse, 59, American inorganic chemist.
- Gurth Hoyer-Millar, 84, Scottish sportsman.
- Clarence C. Jamison, 96, American fighter pilot (Tuskegee Airmen).
- Frank Jobe, 88, American orthopedic surgeon, invented Tommy John surgery.
- Jojon, 66, Indonesian comedian, complications from cardiovascular disease.
- David Koff, 74, American documentary film maker and political activist, suicide.
- Barbro Kollberg, 96, Swedish actress.
- Joe Lane, 78, American politician, member of the Arizona House of Representatives (1979–1989), Speaker (1987–1989), Parkinson's disease.
- Sheila MacRae, 92, English-born American actress (The Honeymooners).
- Gwen Matthewman, 86, English speed knitter.
- Jagat Singh Mehta, 91, Indian diplomat and author, Foreign Secretary (1976–1979), High Commissioner to Tanzania (1970–1974).
- Ron Murphy, 80, Canadian ice hockey player (New York Rangers, Chicago Blackhawks, Detroit Red Wings, Boston Bruins).
- Martin Nesbitt, 67, American politician, member of the North Carolina Senate (2004–2014), stomach cancer.
- Danny Pierce, 93, American artist.
- Georgy Rogozin, 71, Russian army officer and academic.
- Luis Rentería, 25, Panamanian footballer (Tauro), lupus.
- Peter Ruber, 73, American author and editor.
- Manlio Sgalambro, 89, Italian philosopher and writer.
- Speaker Knockerz, 19, American rapper and record producer.
- Margaret Spufford, 78, British historian.
- Marion Stein, 87, British pianist.
- David Talmage, 94, American immunologist.

=== 7 ===
- Lollu Sabha Balaji, 43, Indian comic actor.
- Heiko Bellmann, 63, German biologist, writer and photographer.
- Sir Richard Best, 80, British diplomat, Ambassador to Iceland (1989–1991).
- Bob Charles, 72, English footballer (Southampton).
- Hal Douglas, 89, American voice actor and announcer, pancreatic cancer.
- Peter Dunn, 87, British engineer.
- Bernard G. Ehrlich, 85, American major general and attorney.
- Musa Geshaev, 73, Chechen poet, literary critic, songwriter, and historian.
- Sir Thomas Hinde, 88, British novelist.
- Anatoly Kuznetsov, 83, Russian actor (White Sun of the Desert).
- Peter Laker, 87, English cricketer (Sussex).
- Barnet M. Levy, 97, American oral pathologist.
- Arnulfo Mendoza, 59, Mexican artist and weaver, heart attack.
- Tamás Nádas, 44, Hungarian aerobatics pilot and world champion air racer, plane crash.
- Javier Naranjo Villegas, 95, Colombian Roman Catholic prelate, Bishop of Santa Marta (1971–1980).
- Ned O'Gorman, 84, American poet, pancreatic cancer.
- Victor Shem-Tov, 99, Bulgarian-born Israeli politician, Health Minister (1970–1977), Chairman of Mapam.
- Uwe Timm, 82, German writer.
- Patti Wicks, 69, American jazz singer and pianist, heart failure.

=== 8 ===
- Runa Akiyama, 59, Japanese voice actress, heart failure.
- Tom Barrett, 79, English footballer.
- Leo Bretholz, 93, Austrian-born American Holocaust survivor, activist and writer (Leap into Darkness).
- Bud Bulling, 61, American baseball player (Minnesota Twins, Seattle Mariners).
- Jerry Corbitt, 71, American guitarist, harmonica player, singer, songwriter, and record producer, lung cancer.
- Rowan Cronjé, 76, Rhodesian politician.
- James Ellis, 82, Northern Irish actor (Z-Cars), stroke.
- Buren Fowler, 54, American rock and roll guitarist (Drivin' N Cryin', R.E.M.).
- William Guarnere, 90, American World War II non-commissioned officer and author, key figure in Band of Brothers.
- Omar Ould Hamaha, 50, Malian Islamist militia commander, air strike.
- Roy Higgins, 75, Australian jockey (Light Fingers, Red Handed), Sport Australia Hall of Fame inductee (1987).
- Wendy Hughes, 61, Australian AFI Award-winning actress (Careful, He Might Hear You), cancer.
- Helmut Koenigsberger, 95, German-born British historian.
- Evgeni Krasilnikov, 48, Russian Olympic silver-medalist volleyball player (1988).
- Gerard Mortier, 70, Belgian opera director and administrator, pancreatic cancer.
- Park Eun Ji, 35, South Korean politician.
- Alan Rodgers, 54, American author and poet, winner of the Bram Stoker Award for Best Long Fiction (1987).
- Larry Scott, 75, American bodybuilder, Mr. Olympia (1965, 1966), Alzheimer's disease.
- David Smith, 88, American Olympic champion sailor (1960).
- Randolph W. Thrower, 100, American politician and jurist, Commissioner of Internal Revenue (1969–1971).

=== 9 ===
- Rafael Aburto, 100, Spanish architect.
- Françoise Adnet, 89, French figurative painter.
- Elving Anderson, 92, American geneticist.
- Franklin S. Billings Jr., 91, American politician (member and Speaker of the Vermont House of Representatives) and judge (US District Court, Vermont Supreme Court).
- Greg Brough, 62, Australian Olympic swimmer (1968), cancer.
- John Christie, 84, Scottish footballer (Southampton, Walsall).
- Lionel Seymour Craig, 85, Barbadian politician, MP for Saint James (1966–1986), Cabinet Minister (1976–1986).
- Mike Dietsch, 72, Canadian politician, cancer.
- Mohammed Fahim, 56–57, Afghan politician and military commander, Vice President (since 2009), heart attack.
- William Clay Ford Sr., 88, American businessman (Ford Motor Company, Detroit Lions), pneumonia.
- Valentin Fortunov, 56, Bulgarian writer, publisher and journalist.
- Melba Hernández, 92, Cuban revolutionary, politician and diplomat, Ambassador to Vietnam and Cambodia, complications from diabetes.
- Steve Hill, 60, American pastor and evangelist, melanoma.
- Monika Kinley, 88, British art dealer, collector and curator.
- Richard Liboff, 82, American physicist and author.
- Husein Mehmedov, 90, Bulgarian Olympic silver-medalist wrestler (1956).
- Nazario Moreno González, 44, Mexican drug lord, shot.
- Carlos Moreno, 75, Argentine actor and director, heart attack.
- Marcel F. Neuts, 79, Belgian-born American mathematician and probability theorist.
- Guillo Pérez, 90, Dominican painter.
- Justus Pfaue, 71, German author and screenwriter.
- Joseph Sax, 78, American legal scholar, pioneer of environmental law, stroke.
- James Schaffer, 104, American Christian leader.

=== 10 ===
- Alias Ali, 75, Malaysian politician and newspaper editor (Bernama), MP for Hulu Terengganu (1978–1995), Chairman of Agro Bank, colon cancer.
- Tom Ament, 76, American politician, Milwaukee County Executive (1992–2002).
- Roldan Aquino, 71, Filipino actor, complications from a stroke.
- Juan Balboa Boneke, 75, Equatorial Guinean politician and writer, kidney failure.
- Olha Bura, 27, Ukrainian activist, blood infection.
- Eileen Colgan, 80, Irish actress (Far and Away, My Left Foot, Angela's Ashes).
- Francesco De Nittis, 80, Italian Roman Catholic prelate and diplomat, Apostolic Nuncio to PNG (1981–1985), El Salvador (1985–1990) and Uruguay (1990–1999).
- Richard De Vere, 46, British illusionist (Blackpool Pleasure Beach), pneumonia and heart attack.
- Guy Gauthier, 93, Canadian politician, member of the Legislative Assembly of Quebec.
- Ludomir Goździkiewicz, 78, Polish politician, member of the Sejm (1989–1991).
- Ian Haig, 78, Australian diplomat.
- Richard Hayes, 84, American singer and game show host.
- Don Ingalls, 95, American television writer and producer (Fantasy Island, T. J. Hooker, 12 O'Clock High).
- Patricia Laffan, 94, British actress, multiple organ failure.
- Georges Lamia, 80, French footballer.
- Konrad Lienert, 81, Austrian Olympic pair skater.
- Samuel W. Lewis, 83, American diplomat, Ambassador to Israel (1977–1985).
- Cynthia Lynn, 77, Latvian-born American actress (Hogan's Heroes), multiple organ failure.
- Allen Maxwell, 70, American politician, member of the Arkansas House of Representatives (2004–2010), Mayor of Monticello, Arkansas, heart attack.
- Joe McGinniss, 71, American author and political journalist, prostate cancer.
- Nicolás Mentxaka, 75, Spanish footballer (Athletic Bilbao).
- Ambrose Peddle, 86, Canadian politician.
- Matthew Power, 39, American journalist and magazine editor (Harper's Magazine), complications from heatstroke and exhaustion.
- John Pring, 86, New Zealand rugby union referee.
- Vince Radcliffe, 68, English footballer (Portsmouth).
- Tom Shanahan, 89, American broadcaster and sportscaster.
- Paul J. Sheehy, 79, American politician, member of the Massachusetts House of Representatives (1965–1972) and Senate (1984–1991).
- T. J. Turner, 35, American football player (New England Patriots), cancer.
- John Baird Tyson, 85, British explorer and mountaineer.
- William H. Vernon, 69, American politician, member of the Delaware House of Representatives (1977–1981), cancer.
- Winston Wilkinson, 73, Northern Irish badminton player.
- Rob Williams, 52, American basketball player (Denver Nuggets), heart failure.

=== 11 ===
- Dean Bailey, 47, Australian football player (Essendon) and coach (Melbourne), lung cancer.
- Brett Borgen, 79, Norwegian writer.
- Joel Brinkley, 61, American journalist, Pulitzer Prize winner for International Reporting (1980), pneumonia.
- Len Buckeridge, 77, Australian billionaire construction executive, founder of BGC, heart attack.
- Christine Buckley, 67, Irish activist, breast cancer.
- Marilyn Butler, 77, British literary critic and academic, Rector of Exeter College, Oxford (1993–2004).
- Bob Crow, 52, British trade unionist, General Secretary of the RMT (since 2002), aneurysm and heart attack.
- Vladislav David, 86, Czech lawyer and academic.
- Elisabeth Dhanens, 98, Belgian art historian.
- Berkin Elvan, 15, Turkish student, head trauma from projected tear-gas canister.
- Ronald Gora, 80, American Olympic swimmer.
- Nils Horner, 51, Swedish journalist (Sveriges Radio), shot.
- Elroy Kahanek, 72, American songwriter.
- Edmund Levy, 72, Israeli judge, member of the Supreme Court (2001–2012).
- Our Conor, 4, Irish Thoroughbred racehorse, fall.
- G. S. Paramashivaiah, 95, Indian irrigation engineer.
- John PiRoman, 62, American screenwriter and playwright.
- Ken Russell, 78, American football player (Detroit Lions).
- Eric Sainsbury, 88, British social scientist.
- Hermann Schleinhege, 98, German Luftwaffe ace during World War II and Iron Cross recipient.
- Mehmooda Ali Shah, 94, Indian educationalist.
- Marga Spiegel, 101, German writer.
- Bobby Thompson, 74, American football player (Detroit Lions, Montreal Alouettes).
- Doru Tureanu, 60, Romanian Olympic ice hockey player (1976, 1980).
- David Yeagley, 62, American Comanche political writer.

=== 12 ===
- Cecil Abbott, 89, Australian police chief, Commissioner of New South Wales Police (1981–1984).
- Bahram Askerov, 80, Azerbaijani physicist.
- Věra Chytilová, 85, Czech film director, recipient of the Ordre des Arts et des Lettres, Medal of Merit and the Czech Lion award.
- Phil Conley, 79, American Olympic athlete.
- Myles Conte, 66, South African cricketer.
- Richard Coogan, 99, American actor (Captain Video and His Video Rangers, The Californians).
- Paul C. Donnelly, 90, American aerospace pioneer.
- Med Flory, 87, American saxophonist (Supersax) and actor (Daniel Boone, Gomer Pyle, U.S.M.C., Lassie).
- Myk Friedman, 44, American animator, art director, artist, writer, voice actor, graphic designer (Isle of the Dead, Nerves of Steel, Toonsmyth Productions), diabetes.
- Jackie Gaughan, 93, American hotelier and casino owner (El Cortez, Las Vegas Club, The Western, Gold Spike).
- Wil Jones, 75, American basketball player and coach, pancreatic cancer.
- Art Kenney, 97, American baseball player (Boston Bees).
- Bill Knott, 73, American poet.
- René Llense, 100, French footballer.
- Fortunatus M. Lukanima, 73, Tanzanian Roman Catholic prelate, Bishop of Arusha (1989–1998).
- Celmira Luzardo, 61, Colombian television actress.
- Ola L. Mize, 82, American army officer, Korean War recipient of the Medal of Honor.
- John Cullen Nugent, 93, Canadian artist, sculptor and photographer.
- Kjell Nupen, 58, Norwegian artist, cancer.
- Kyojin Onishi, 97, Japanese novelist, pneumonia.
- Calvin Palmer, 73, English footballer, cancer.
- José Policarpo, 78, Portuguese Roman Catholic cardinal, Patriarch of Lisbon (1998–2013), aortic aneurysm.
- Jenny Romatowski, 86, American AAGPBL baseball player.
- Zoja Rudnova, 67, Russian table tennis player.
- David Sive, 91, American environmental lawyer.
- Ray Still, 94, American classical oboist (Chicago Symphony Orchestra).
- Jean Vallée, 72, Belgian songwriter and performer.

=== 13 ===
- Reubin Askew, 85, American politician, Governor of Florida (1971–1979), member of the Florida House of Representatives (1958–1962) and Senate (1962–1971).
- Bill Ballard, 67, Canadian concert promoter and sport franchise owner (Toronto Maple Leafs), cancer.
- Chérifa, 88, Algerian singer-songwriter.
- Angelo Martino Colombo, 78, Italian footballer.
- Jan Erik Düring, 87, Norwegian director.
- Benjamin Enríquez, 83, Filipino boxer.
- Raymond Flood, 78, English cricketer (Hampshire).
- Joseph Bacon Fraser Jr., 88, American real estate developer.
- Paulo Goulart, 81, Brazilian actor, cancer.
- Al Harewood, 90, American jazz drummer.
- Edward Haughey, Baron Ballyedmond, 70, Northern Irish politician, member of the House of Lords, founder of the Norbrook Group, helicopter crash.
- Ahmad Tejan Kabbah, 82, Sierra Leonean politician, President (1996–1997, 1998–2007).
- S. Mallikarjunaiah, 82, Indian politician, MP for Tumkur (1991–2009), Karnataka MLA for Tumkur (1971–1991), heart attack.
- Vince McGlone, 97, New Zealand seaman and television personality.
- Icchokas Meras, 79, Lithuanian-born Israeli writer, recipient of the Lithuanian National Prize (2010).
- Petar Miloševski, 40, Macedonian footballer (Enosis Neon Paralimni), traffic collision.·
- Serge Perrault, 93, French ballet dancer and teacher.
- Pierre Prat, 84, French Olympic athlete.
- Abby Singer, 96, American production manager (Major Dad, Remington Steele, St. Elsewhere), cancer.
- Len Velander, 93, American football coach.
- Wang King-ho, 97, Taiwanese physician.
- Henk Weerink, 77, Dutch football referee.
- Janusz Zabłocki, 88, Polish politician and Catholic activist, MP (1965–1985).

=== 14 ===
- John Agoglia, 76, American television executive (NBC), instrumental in decision to replace Johnny Carson with Jay Leno, cancer.
- Tony Benn, 88, British politician, Minister of Technology (1966–1970), Secretary of State (1974–1979), MP for Bristol South East (1950–1960, 1963–1983) and Chesterfield (1984–2001).
- Otakar Brousek Sr., 89, Czech actor.
- Gary Burger, 72, American singer (The Monks), pancreatic cancer.
- John Burgess, 82, British record producer and production company executive.
- Cao Shunli, 52, Chinese human rights activist, complications from pneumonia.
- Rodney M. Coe, 80, American medical sociologist.
- Ted Cohen, 74, American philosopher.
- Jiří Dadák, 88, Czech Olympic hammer thrower.
- John de Salis, 9th Count de Salis-Soglio, 66, British major.
- Yves Delacour, 83, French Olympic rower (1956).
- Richard Dermer, 74, American restaurateur, founder of Hideaway Pizza.
- Jon Ewing, 77, Australian actor and director.
- Hans Fogh, 76, Danish-born Canadian Olympic sailor.
- Alec Gaskell, 81, English footballer.
- Meir Har-Zion, 80, Israeli commando.
- Vello Helk, 90, Estonian-born Danish historian.
- Bill Icke, 93, Australian rules footballer (South Melbourne, Geelong).
- Gašo Knežević, 60, Serbian academic and politician, Minister of Education (2001–2004).
- Sam Lacey, 66, American basketball player (Cincinnati Royals).
- Roger Leir, 80, American podiatric surgeon and ufologist.
- Ioan Lewis, 84, Scottish anthropologist.
- Hugh Lunghi, 93, British military interpreter (Winston Churchill), one of the last living Big Three participants, first British soldier to enter Hitler's bunker.
- Warwick Parer, 77, Australian politician, Senator for Queensland (1984–2000), Minister for Resources and Energy (1996–1998).
- Sam Peffer, 92, British commercial artist.
- Werner Rackwitz, 84, German opera director and politician.
- Bob Thomas, 92, American journalist (Associated Press) and biographer.
- Manuel Torres Pastor, 83, Spanish footballer (Real Zaragoza, Real Madrid).
- Ken Utsui, 82, Japanese actor (Super Giant).
- Wesley Warren Jr., 50, American scrotal elephantiasis victim, heart attack.

=== 15 ===
- Reşat Amet, 39, Crimean Tatar activist, murdered.
- Maria Anzai, 60, Japanese singer.
- Scott Asheton, 64, American drummer (The Stooges), heart attack.
- David Brenner, 78, American comedian, cancer.
- Charlotte Brooks, 95, American photographer (Look).
- Andrew Kenneth Burroughs, 60, British consultant physician.
- Bo Callaway, 86, American politician, Secretary of the Army, member of the US House of Representatives for Georgia, complications from a brain hemorrhage.
- Mars Cramer, 85, Dutch economist.
- Paddy Cronin, 88, Irish fiddler.
- Huseyn Derya, 38, Azerbaijani rapper, traffic collision.
- Clarissa Dickson Wright, 66, English celebrity chef and television personality (Two Fat Ladies).
- H. Hugh Fudenberg, 85, American immunologist.
- Everett L. Fullam, 82, American Episcopalian priest.
- Robert C. Horton, 87, American mining engineer.
- Miervaldis Jurševskis, 92, Latvian-Canadian chess player.
- Jürgen Kurbjuhn, 73, German footballer (Hamburger SV).
- Jesper Langballe, 74, Danish politician, MP for Viborg (2001–2011).
- Ed Meyer, 77, American football player (Buffalo Bills).
- Jim Mikol, 75, Canadian ice hockey player (New York Rangers).
- Luca Moro, 41, Italian race car driver, brain tumor.
- Marie Nightingale, 85, Canadian cookbook author, cancer.
- Lorenzo Parente, 78, Italian-born American professional wrestler.
- Cees Veerman, 70, Dutch singer and musician (The Cats).

=== 16 ===
- George E. Barker, 83–84, British philatelist.
- Gary Bettenhausen, 72, American race car driver.
- Marc Blondel, 75, French trade union leader.
- Markus Brüderlin, 55, Swiss art historian and curator.
- Carlos Camus, 87, Chilean Roman Catholic prelate, Bishop of Copiapó (1968–1976) and Linares (1976–2003).
- Donald Crothers, 77, American chemist.
- Lapiro de Mbanga, 56, Cameroonian musician, political and social activist, cancer.
- DJ Edwin, 46, Australian DJ, remixer, songwriter and producer, heart attack.
- Joseph Fan Zhongliang, 95, Chinese Roman Catholic prelate and confined dissident, Bishop of Shanghai (since 2000).
- Sanjeeva Kaviratne, 44, Sri Lankan politician, member of the Central Provincial Council, MP for Matale District.
- Dzintars Krišjānis, 55, Latvian Olympic rower.
- Mitch Leigh, 86, American Tony Award-winning composer (Man of La Mancha), pneumonia as a complication of a stroke.
- Yulisa Pat Amadu Maddy, 77, Sierra Leonean poet, playwright, novelist and political prisoner.
- Steve Moore, 64, British cartoonist and writer.
- Frank Oliver, 65, New Zealand rugby player and coach.
- Alexander Pochinok, 56, Russian economist, Minister of Taxes and Levies (1999–2000), Minister of Labor and Social Development (2000–2004), cardiac arrest.
- Renzo Ranuzzi, 89, Italian Olympic basketball player.
- Chuck Scherza, 91, Canadian ice hockey player (Boston Bruins, New York Rangers).
- Cesare Segre, 85, Italian philologist, semiotician and literary critic.
- Nicholas Spaeth, 64, American lawyer, North Dakota Attorney General (1985–1992).
- Kenneth Wade, 81, British chemist.
- Denké Kossi Wazo, 55, Togolese footballer.

=== 17 ===
- Robert L. Belknap, 83, American scholar.
- Mareike Carrière, 59, German actress, bladder cancer.
- Jim Compton, 72, American journalist (NBC News), heart attack.
- José Delicado Baeza, 87, Spanish Roman Catholic prelate, Archbishop of Valladolid (1975–2002).
- Mercy Edirisinghe, 68, Sri Lankan actress and singer.
- Charley Feeney, 89, American sportswriter.
- Gene Feist, 91, American playwright and theatre director, co-founder of the Roundabout Theater Company.
- Marek Galiński, 39, Polish Olympic cyclist (1996, 2000, 2004, 2008), traffic collision.
- Joseph Kerman, 89, American musicologist.
- Donald Michael Kraig, 62, American occultist author and practitioner, pancreatic cancer.
- Paddy McGuigan, 74, Irish songwriter ("The Men Behind the Wire", "The Boys of the Old Brigade") and musician (The Barleycorn).
- Rachel Lambert Mellon, 103, American horticulturalist and arts patron.
- Oswald Morris, 98, British cinematographer (Fiddler on the Roof, The Guns of Navarone, Oliver!), Oscar winner (1972).
- Al Oeming, 88, Canadian professional wrestler and wildlife conservationist, co-founder of Stampede Wrestling, complications following heart surgery.
- Rohan O'Grady, 91, Canadian author.
- Antoni Opolski, 100, Polish physicist.
- Mohamed Salah Jedidi, 76, Tunisian footballer (Club Africain).
- L'Wren Scott, 49, American fashion designer and model, suicide by hanging.
- Egon Sendler, 90, German-born French Jesuit priest and art historian.
- James E. Stowers, 90, American investment management executive and philanthropist, founder of American Century Investments.
- Roy Trantham, 73, American stock car racing driver, leukemia.
- Quinto Vadi, 92, Italian Olympic gymnast (1948, 1952).

=== 18 ===
- Catherine Obianuju Acholonu, 62, Nigerian academic and feminist scholar, kidney failure.
- Jeffrey Anderson, 85, Canadian broadcaster, journalist and producer, CBC London bureau chief.
- Jorge Arvizu, 81, Mexican voice actor, heart failure.
- Karl Baumgartner, 65, Italian-born German film producer (Le Havre, Underground).
- Albert Dormer, 88, British bridge player.
- Vernita Gray, 65, American activist, cancer.
- Kaiser Kalambo, 60, Zambian football player and coach, prostate cancer.
- Derek Knee, 91, British military interpreter (Field Marshal Montgomery).
- Serhiy Kokurin, 36, Ukrainian soldier, shot.
- Sydney Kustu, 71, American microbiologist, suicide by sodium azide poisoning.
- Joe Lala, 66, American musician and actor (Monsters, Inc., On Deadly Ground), complications from lung cancer.
- Tivadar Monostori, 77, Hungarian footballer (Dorogi FC).
- Ahmad Naruyi, 51, Iranian Sunni theologian, human rights activist and journalist.
- Lucius Shepard, 70, American science fiction author.
- Ara Shiraz, 72, Armenian architect and sculptor, complications from stroke.
- Ben Staartjes, 85, Dutch Olympic sailor.
- Raili Tuominen-Hämäläinen, 81, Finnish Olympic gymnast.

=== 19 ===
- Robert Butler, 70, American artist, member of The Highwaymen, complications from diabetes.
- Ken Forsse, 77, American inventor and television producer, creator of the Teddy Ruxpin, heart failure.
- Rodney E. Gutzler, 67, American politician.
- Patrick Joseph McGovern, 76, American technology executive, founder and chairman of IDG.
- Ernest Mühlen, 87, Luxembourgish politician, MEP (1984–1989), MP (1989–1991).
- Fred Phelps, 84, American pastor and anti-gay activist, founder of the Westboro Baptist Church.
- Esteban Reyes, 100, Mexican tennis player.
- Enric Ribelles, 80, Spanish footballer.
- Heather Robertson, 72, Canadian journalist (Winnipeg Free Press) and author, cancer.
- Philip Saliba, 82, Lebanese-born American Orthodox prelate, Metropolitan of the AOCANA (since 1966).
- Robert S. Strauss, 95, American politician and diplomat, Ambassador to Russia (1991–1992).
- László Szőke, 83, Hungarian footballer.
- Hank Utley, 89, American author and historian, executive director of Boys Club.
- Idly Walpoth, 93, Swiss Olympian
- Lawrence Walsh, 102, American lawyer and judge, Independent Counsel for the Iran–Contra affair, member of the US District Court for Southern New York (1954–1957).
- Joseph F. Weis Jr., 91, American judge, U.S. Court of Appeals – Third Circuit (1973–1988), U.S. District Court for Western Pennsylvania (1970–1973), kidney failure.

=== 20 ===
- Ragesh Asthana, 51, Ugandan-born Indian actor, heart attack.
- Hennie Aucamp, 80, South African poet, short story writer, cabaretist and academic.
- Iñaki Azkuna, 71, Spanish Basque politician, Mayor of Bilbao (since 1999) and World Mayor (2012), prostate cancer.
- Hilderaldo Bellini, 83, Brazilian footballer, two-time World Cup winner (1958, 1962), complications from a heart attack.
- Andrzej Grzegorczyk, 91, Polish mathematician.
- Judy Harrow, 69, American author and Wiccan priestess.
- Dick Heller, 76, American sportswriter (The Washington Times).
- Dennis Jackson, 82, English footballer (Aston Villa).
- Thomas Jolley, 70, American anti–war protester.
- Joseph Kenton, 92, American politician.
- Mohamed Mjid, 97, Moroccan politician.
- Kristian Mosegaard, 83, Danish footballer.
- Tonie Nathan, 91, American politician, first woman to receive an electoral vote in a presidential election, Alzheimer's disease.
- Tommy O'Connell, 83, American football player (Cleveland Browns, Buffalo Bills).
- Ahmad Sardar, 40, Afghan journalist (Agence France-Presse), shot.
- Khushwant Singh, 99, Indian journalist and author (Train to Pakistan).
- Roland Svensson, 68, Swedish Olympic wrestler.
- William Toomath, 88, New Zealand architect.
- Marc-Adélard Tremblay, 91, Canadian anthropologist.
- Murray Weidenbaum, 87, American economist, Chairperson of the Council of Economic Advisers (1981–1982).

=== 21 ===
- Deborah Backer, 54, Guyanese politician, Deputy Speaker of the National Assembly.
- Qoriniasi Bale, 85, Fijian lawyer and politician, Attorney-General (1984–1987, 2001–2006).
- David Beaglehole, 76, New Zealand physicist.
- Bill Boedeker, 90, American football player (Cleveland Browns).
- Jim Brasco, 83, American basketball player.
- Jack Fleck, 92, American professional golfer, winner of the U.S. Open (1955).
- Linda Gerard, 75, American cabaret artist, cancer.
- Michael Henley, 76, British Anglican prelate, Bishop of St Andrews, Dunkeld and Dunblane (1995–2004).
- Ignatius Zakka I Iwas, 80, Iraqi religious leader, Patriarch of the Syriac Orthodox Church (since 1980).
- Terry David Jones, 75, Canadian politician.
- Vincent Lamberti, 86, American medical researcher, developed the original Dove Soap bar, complications from heart failure.
- André Lavagne, 100, French composer.
- Edward E. Masters, 89, American diplomat, Ambassador to Bangladesh (1976–1977) and Indonesia (1977–1981).
- Julian Moynahan, 89, American academic.
- Simeon Oduoye, 68, Nigerian politician, Senator for Osun (2003–2007).
- Kiril Pandov, 85, Bulgarian footballer (PFC Spartak Varna).
- Kostis Papagiorgis, 66, Greek writer and translator.
- Nenad Petrović, 88, Serbian writer.
- Jorge Pontual, 89, Brazilian Olympic sailor.
- James Rebhorn, 65, American actor (Scent of a Woman, Independence Day, Homeland), melanoma.
- Oddvar Rønnestad, 78, Norwegian Olympic alpine skier.
- Adrian Taylor, 60, American television news producer (60 Minutes, The Early Show), winner of the Peabody Award (2013), pancreatic cancer.
- Sir Colin Turner, 92, British politician, MP for Woolwich West (1959–1964).
- William Vahey, 64, American schoolteacher and child molester, suicide by stabbing.

=== 22 ===
- Hermann Buhl, 78, German Olympic runner.
- Yashwant Vithoba Chittal, 85, Indian Sahitya Akademi Award-winning author (The Boy who Talked to Trees).
- Mickey Duff, 84, Polish-born British boxing manager and promoter, International Boxing Hall of Fame inductee (1999).
- Kurt Rudolf Fischer, 92, Austrian philosopher.
- Riina Gerretz, 74, Estonian pianist.
- Hamza Abu al-Haija, 22, Palestinian militant (Hamas), shot.
- Yngve A. A. Larsson, 97, Swedish pediatrician, professor of medicine and diabetologist.
- Thor Listau, 75, Norwegian politician, Minister of Fisheries (1981–1985), MP for Finnmark (1973–1985).
- Lavinia Loughridge, 83, Northern Irish physician.
- Charles Magel, 93, American philosopher and animal rights activist.
- Robert Meyers, 89, Canadian Olympic champion ice hockey player (1952).
- Tasos Mitsopoulos, 48, Cypriot politician, Defence Minister (2014), MP (2006–2013), complications from a brain haemorrhage.
- Ken Plant, 88, English footballer (Nuneaton Borough, Colchester United).
- Antoine Porcel, 76, French Olympic boxer.
- Lou Rell, 73, American Naval and commercial aviator, First Gentleman of Connecticut (2004–2011), cancer.
- Siddakatte Chennappa Shetty, 62, Indian Yakshagana orator.
- Patrice Wymore, 87, American actress (Ocean's 11, Tea for Two, The Big Trees) and philanthropist.

=== 23 ===
- Valentina Ballod, 76, Uzbekistani Olympic high jumper (1956, 1960).
- Ashley Booth, 76, Scottish footballer (St Johnstone, East Fife).
- Carmelo Bossi, 74, Italian Olympic silver-medalist boxer (1960) and world junior middleweight champion (1970–1971).
- Dave Brockie, 50, Canadian-born American heavy metal singer (Gwar), heroin overdose.
- Jack Clancy, 79, Australian football player.
- Bobby Croft, 68, Canadian basketball player (Kentucky Colonels, Texas Chaparrals), first Canadian to get a full scholarship to NCAA school for basketball.
- Miller M. Duris, 86, American politician, Mayor of Hillsboro, Oregon (1973–1977).
- Walter Ewbank, 96, British Anglican prelate, Archdeacon of Westmorland and Furness (1971–1977), Archdeacon of Carlisle (1978–1984).
- John M. Goshko, 80, American journalist (The Washington Post), kidney failure.
- Abdul Hakim, Bangladeshi politician.
- David Henshaw, 74, New Zealand cartoonist.
- Roy Peter Martin, 83, British author.
- Jürg Neuenschwander, 67, Swiss organist and composer, cerebral hemorrhage.
- Peter Oakley, 86, British Internet vlogger, cancer.
- B. Palaniappan, 83, Indian gynaecologist.
- William Peters, 90, British diplomat and activist (Jubilee 2000).
- Parviz C. Radji, 77, Iranian diplomat, Ambassador to the United Kingdom (1976–1979).
- Jaroslav Šerých, 86, Czech painter, printmaker and illustrator.
- Miroslav Štěpán, 68, Czech politician, member of the Central Committee for the Communist Party (1988–1989), complications from cancer.
- Adolfo Suárez, 81, Spanish politician and lawyer, Prime Minister (1976–1981) and leader of Spanish transition to democracy, Duke of Suárez (since 1981), respiratory infection.

=== 24 ===
- Giuseppe Agostino, 85, Italian Roman Catholic prelate, Archbishop of Crotone-Santa Severina (1973–1998) and Cosenza-Bisignano (1998–2004).
- Geoff Bradford, 80, English guitarist.
- Victor Hugo Caula, 86, Argentinian cameraman and director of photography.
- Robert F. Coleman, 59, American mathematician.
- Margaret di Menna, 90, New Zealand microbiologist.
- Rusi Dinshaw, 86, Pakistani cricketer.
- Gerald Lamb, 89, American politician.
- Arne Løvlie, 83, Norwegian zoologist.
- Jean-François Mattéi, 73, French philosopher.
- Tom Mikula, 87, American football player (Brooklyn Dodgers).
- Oleksandr Muzychko, 51, Ukrainian political activist, shot.
- Bryan Orritt, 77, Welsh footballer (Birmingham City, Middlesbrough), stroke.
- Kuldeep Pawar, 65, Indian actor, kidney failure.
- Paulo Schroeber, 40, Brazilian guitarist (Almah), heart failure.
- William R. Stoeger, 71, American astronomer and theologian.
- John Rowe Townsend, 91, British children's author (The Intruder).
- David A. Trampier, 59, American fantasy gaming artist (Dungeons & Dragons).
- David Walker, 81, British Olympic rower.
- Rodney Wilkes, 89, Trinidadian Olympic silver- and bronze-medalist weightlifter (1948, 1952).

=== 25 ===
- Lorna Arnold, 98, British nuclear historian and author, stroke.
- Harm de Blij, 78, Dutch-born American geographer.
- Meredith Bordeaux, 101, American politician, member of the Maine House of Representatives (1979–1982).
- Dil Bahadur Lama, 84, Nepali politician and police official, cardiac arrest.
- Jeffery Dench, 85, British actor (First Knight).
- Harley Dow, 88, American football player (San Francisco 49ers).
- Hank Lauricella, 83, American Hall of Fame football player (Tennessee Volunteers) and politician, member of the Louisiana House of Representatives (1966–1972) and Senate (1972–1996).
- Eddie Lawrence, 95, American actor, comedian and singer.
- Mon Levinson, 88, American sculptor.
- Jon Lord, 57, Canadian politician, Alberta MLA for Calgary-Currie (2001–2004), heart attack.
- Nicky McFadden, 51, Irish politician, TD for Longford–Westmeath (since 2011), complications from motor neurone disease.
- Ángel César Mendoza Arámburo, 79, Mexican politician, Governor of Baja California Sur (1975–1981).
- Nanda, 75, Indian actress (Teen Devian, Gumnaam, Chhoti Bahen), heart attack.
- Frank O'Keeffe, 91, Irish Gaelic football player (Kerry).
- Mohammad Ebrahim Bastani Parizi, 89, Iranian historian and author.
- Reinhold Pommer, 79, German Olympic cyclist (1956).
- Joseph Purtill, 86, American politician and judge, member of the Connecticut House of Representatives (1959–1961).
- Jerry Roberts, 93, British wartime codebreaker, member of the Testery unit.
- Sonny Ruberto, 68, American baseball player (San Diego Padres), cancer.
- Jonathan Schell, 70, American author, journalist and anti-war activist, cancer.
- Thi. Ka. Sivasankaran, 88, Indian Sahitya Akademi Award-winning author and literary critic.
- Robert Slater, 70, American author and journalist, complications from influenza.
- Ralph Wilson, 95, American Hall of Fame football team owner (Buffalo Bills) and racehorse breeder (Arazi), co-founder of the AFL.
- Lode Wouters, 84, Belgian Olympic gold- and bronze-medalist cyclist (1948).

=== 26 ===
- Roger Birkman, 95, American organizational psychologist.
- George Bookasta, 96, American child actor, pneumonia.
- Gangaram Choudhary, 92, Indian politician.
- Chu Teh-Chun, 93, Chinese-born French painter.
- Shun Lien Chuang, 59, American engineer.
- John Garry Clifford, 72, American historian.
- John Disney, 94, Australian ornithologist.
- Warren Forma, 90, American documentary filmmaker and author.
- Barbara Halloran Gibbons, 80, American cookbook author and columnist.
- Dick Guidry, 84, American politician, member of the Louisiana House of Representatives (1950–1954, 1964–1976).
- Ann Howard, 79, English mezzo-soprano, pulmonary embolism.
- Tom Jones, 90, Australian politician, Member for Collie (1968–1989).
- Marcus Kimball, 85, British politician, MP for Gainsborough (1956–1983).
- Wolfgang Kirchgässner, 85, German Roman Catholic prelate, Auxiliary Bishop of Freiburg im Breisgau (1979–1998).
- Thomas Landauer, 81, American experimental psychologist.
- George Lerchen, 91, American baseball player (Detroit Tigers, Cincinnati Redlegs).
- Noriko Matsumoto, 78, Japanese actress, interstitial pneumonia.
- Mark Stock, 62, American artist, enlarged heart.

=== 27 ===
- Francine Beers, 89, American actress (Law & Order, Three Men and a Baby, Keeping the Faith).
- Bertrando, 25, American Thoroughbred Champion racehorse (Woodward Stakes, Goodwood Breeder's Cup Handicap, Pacific Classic Stakes).
- Al Cihocki, 89, American baseball player (Cleveland Indians).
- Kent Cochrane, 62, Canadian amnesiac, had one of the most studied human brains.
- Max Coll, 82, American politician, member of the New Mexico House of Representatives (1972–2004), stroke.
- John Cornes, 66, Australian rugby player.
- Jean-Claude Colliard, 68, French political scientist and politician, member of the Constitutional Council (1998–2007).
- Nevio de Zordo, 71, Italian Olympic silver-medalist bobsledder (1972).
- Augustin Deleanu, 69, Romanian footballer (Dinamo București).
- Richard N. Frye, 94, American scholar of Armenian studies.
- Hal M. Lattimore, 93, American judge, member of the Texas Court of Appeals.
- Per Lillo-Stenberg, 85, Norwegian actor.
- Joseph Madachy, 87, American research chemist and mathematician, editor of Journal of Recreational Mathematics.
- Derek Martinus, 82, British television director (Doctor Who, Blake's 7, Z-Cars), Alzheimer's disease.
- Robert Ojo, 72, Nigerian Olympic sprinter.
- Gina Pellón, 87, Cuban painter.
- P. Ramdas, 83, Indian film director, winner of the J. C. Daniel Award (2007).
- Joseph Rigano, 80, American actor (Casino, Mickey Blue Eyes, Analyze This), throat cancer.
- James R. Schlesinger, 85, American government official, Director of the CIA (1973), Secretary of Defense (1973–1975), Secretary of Energy (1977–1979), pneumonia.
- Michael Schofield, 94, British sociologist and campaigner.
- Arsenio Valdez, 71, Paraguayan footballer.

=== 28 ===
- GOK Ajayi, 82, Nigerian lawyer.
- Mayada Ashraf, appr. 22, Egyptian journalist, shot.
- Rawle Barrow, 79, Trinidad and Tobago Olympic sailor.
- Carlos Miguel Benn, 89, Argentine yacht racer. (death announced on this date)
- Jeremiah Denton, 89, American politician and military officer, Senator from Alabama (1981–1987), recipient of the Navy Cross, complications from a heart ailment.
- Robin Gibson, 83, Australian architect (Queensland Cultural Centre). (death announced on this date)
- Barbara Gray, 87, American politician.
- Edwin Kagin, 73, American lawyer, national legal director for the American Atheists, heart disease.
- Michael F. Lappert, 85, British chemist.
- Billy "The Texan" Longley, 88, Australian criminal.
- Sam McAughtry, 93, Northern Irish writer and broadcaster.
- Godfrey Mdimi Mhogolo, 62, Tanzanian Anglican prelate, Bishop of Central Tanganyika (since 1989), lung infection.
- Reiko Mori, 85, Japanese novelist and playwright, pancreatic cancer.
- Michael Putney, 67, Australian Roman Catholic prelate, Bishop of Townsville (since 2001), stomach cancer.
- Lorenzo Semple Jr., 91, American screenwriter (Batman, Flash Gordon, Three Days of the Condor).
- Avraham Yaski, 86, Romanian-born Israeli architect and academic, recipient of the Israel Prize (1982).

=== 29 ===
- Hobart Alter, 80, American surfer and boat designer (Hobie cat).
- Lelio Antoniotti, 86, Italian footballer.
- Catherine Hayes Bailey, 92, American plant geneticist.
- Roderick Bell, 66, Canadian diplomat.
- Mark Chamberlain, 82, American educator, President of Rowan University (1969–1984).
- James Churgin, 85, American geologist and oceanographer.
- Yosef Hamadani Cohen, 98, Iranian Jewish prelate, Chief Rabbi of Iran (since 1994).
- Karl Spillman Forester, 73, American senior (former chief) judge, member of the US District Court for Eastern Kentucky (since 1988).
- Elbert Gill, 82, American politician, member of the Tennessee House of Representatives (1966–1986).
- Butch Maples, 73, American football player (Baltimore Colts).
- Billy Mundi, 71, American drummer (The Mothers of Invention, Rhinoceros), complications from diabetes.
- Marc Platt, 100, American dancer and actor (Oklahoma!, Seven Brides for Seven Brothers).
- Oldřich Škácha, 72, Czech photographer and dissident.
- Ron Stott, 76, American politician, member of the New York State Assembly (1975–1977), Mayor of North Syracuse, New York (1971–1974).
- Birgitta Valberg, 97, Swedish actress.
- Dane Witherspoon, 56, American actor (Santa Barbara, Capitol).

=== 30 ===
- Muhammadu Kudu Abubakar, 52, Nigerian Emir of Agaie (since 2004).
- Robert Billingham, 56, American Olympic silver medal-winning sailor (1988), official and skipper, member of 1992 America's Cup winning team.
- Richard Black, 92, American commercial artist and landscape painter, creator of the Mr. Clean and Smokey Bear mascots.
- Thomas Ryan Byrne, 91, American historian, economist, and diplomat.
- Sean Cusack, 87, Irish soccer player.
- Gerardo D'Ambrosio, 83, Italian politician and magistrate.
- Michael Edmonds, 87, British artist, co-founder of 56 Group Wales.
- Victor Gankin, 78, Russian-American scientist.
- Sir David Gibbons, 85, Bermudian politician, Premier (1977–1982).
- Jan de Graaff, 70, Dutch television journalist.
- Keizō Kanie, 69, Japanese actor, stomach cancer.
- Lyman Kipp, 84, American sculptor and painter.
- Kate O'Mara, 74, English actress (Dynasty, Doctor Who, Howards' Way), ovarian cancer.
- Alice Raftary, 86, American educator of blind adults.
- Phuntsok Wangyal, 92, Chinese Tibetan politician, military leader and government critic, led invasion of Tibet (1950–1951).
- Fred Stansfield, 96, Welsh international footballer.
- Patricia A. Weitsman, 49, American political scientist, leukemia.

=== 31 ===
- Gonzalo Anes, 82, Spanish historian, Director of Real Academia de la Historia (since 1998).
- Anthony Beattie, 69, British civil servant, complications from a fall.
- Stanley L. Englebardt, 88, American journalist.
- Irene Fernandez, 67, Malaysian advocate for women and migrant workers, heart failure.
- Władysław Filipowiak, 87, Polish archaeologist and historian.
- Bryan Gahol, 36, Filipino basketball player, traffic collision.
- David Hannay, 74, Australian film producer.
- Edmond Harjo, 96, American Seminole Code Talker during World War II, recipient of the Congressional Gold Medal (2013), heart attack.
- Ben Johnson, 74, American Makah tribal politician and fisheries expert, heart attack.
- Charles Keating, 90, American banker, key figure in the savings and loan crisis.
- Frankie Knuckles, 59, American disc jockey and record producer, complications from diabetes.
- Bob Larbey, 79, British television writer (Please Sir!, The Good Life, As Time Goes By).
- Ferdinand Masset, 93, Swiss politician.
- Jimmy Newton, 35–36, American Southern Ute tribal chief, Chairman of the Reservation (since 2011).
- Renée Richard, 85, French cheesemonger.
- Bob Ringma, 85, Canadian politician and army officer.
- Max Robinson, 81, Australian politician, member of the Tasmanian House of Assembly (1976–1979).
- Hermann von Siebenthal, 79, Swiss Olympic equestrian.
- Enrique Plancarte Solís, 43, Mexican drug lord, shot.
- Roger Somville, 90, Belgian painter.
- Asep Sunandar Sunarya, 58, Indonesian wayang golek puppeteer, heart attack.
- Ahmet Yorulmaz, 81–82, Turkish writer.
