= Antonio Hidalgo =

Antonio Hidalgo is the name of:

- Antonio Hidalgo (defender, born 1943), Spanish footballer
- Antonio Hidalgo (forward, born 1943), Spanish footballer
- Antonio Hidalgo (footballer, born 1979), Spanish footballer
- Antonio Hidalgo López, Spanish government minister
- Antonio Hidalgo Sandoval (1876–1972), Mexican politician, governor of Tlaxcala (1911–1913)
- Antonio Masip Hidalgo (born 1946), Spanish politician and Member of the European Parliament
