= Matthewman =

Matthewman is a surname. Notable people with the surname include:

- Gwen Matthewman (1927–2014)
- Keith Matthewman (1936–2008), English judge
- Phyllis Matthewman (1896–1979), English writer
- Stuart Matthewman (born 1960), English musician
- Thomas Matthewman (1903–1990), British sprinter
