= Edward Osborne (disambiguation) =

Edward Osborne was a merchant and Lord Mayor of London.

Edward Osborne may also refer to:

- Edward Osborne (MP for Sudbury) (1572-1625), MP for Sudbury (UK Parliament constituency), 1621
- Edward Osborne, Viscount Latimer (1655–1689), MP for Corfe Castle and Buckinghamshire
- Edward Osborne (Mayor of Hythe) (1861–1939), Mayor of Hythe
- Sir Edward Osborne, 1st Baronet (1596–1647), English politician
- Edward B. Osborne (1814–1893), New York politician
- F. Edward Osborne (1925–2014), American politician and businessman in Idaho
- Edward William Osborne (1845–1926), Episcopal bishop

== See also ==
- E. O. Wilson (Edward Osborne Wilson, born 1929), American biologist, researcher and author
