= Senator Osborne =

Senator Osborne may refer to:

- Edward B. Osborne (1814–1893), New York State Senate
- F. Edward Osborne (1925–2014), Idaho State Senate
- Frank I. Osborne (1853–1920), North Carolina State Senate
- Thomas Burr Osborne (politician) (1798–1869), Connecticut State Senate

== See also ==
- Senator Osborn (disambiguation)
