= Velander =

Velander is a surname. Notable people with the surname include:

- Ella Tengbom-Velander (1921–2022), Swedish politician
- Len Velander (1920–2014), Swedish-born American football coach
- Meta Velander (1924–2025), Swedish actress
