= Galerie Cesty ke světlu =

Gallery in Prague

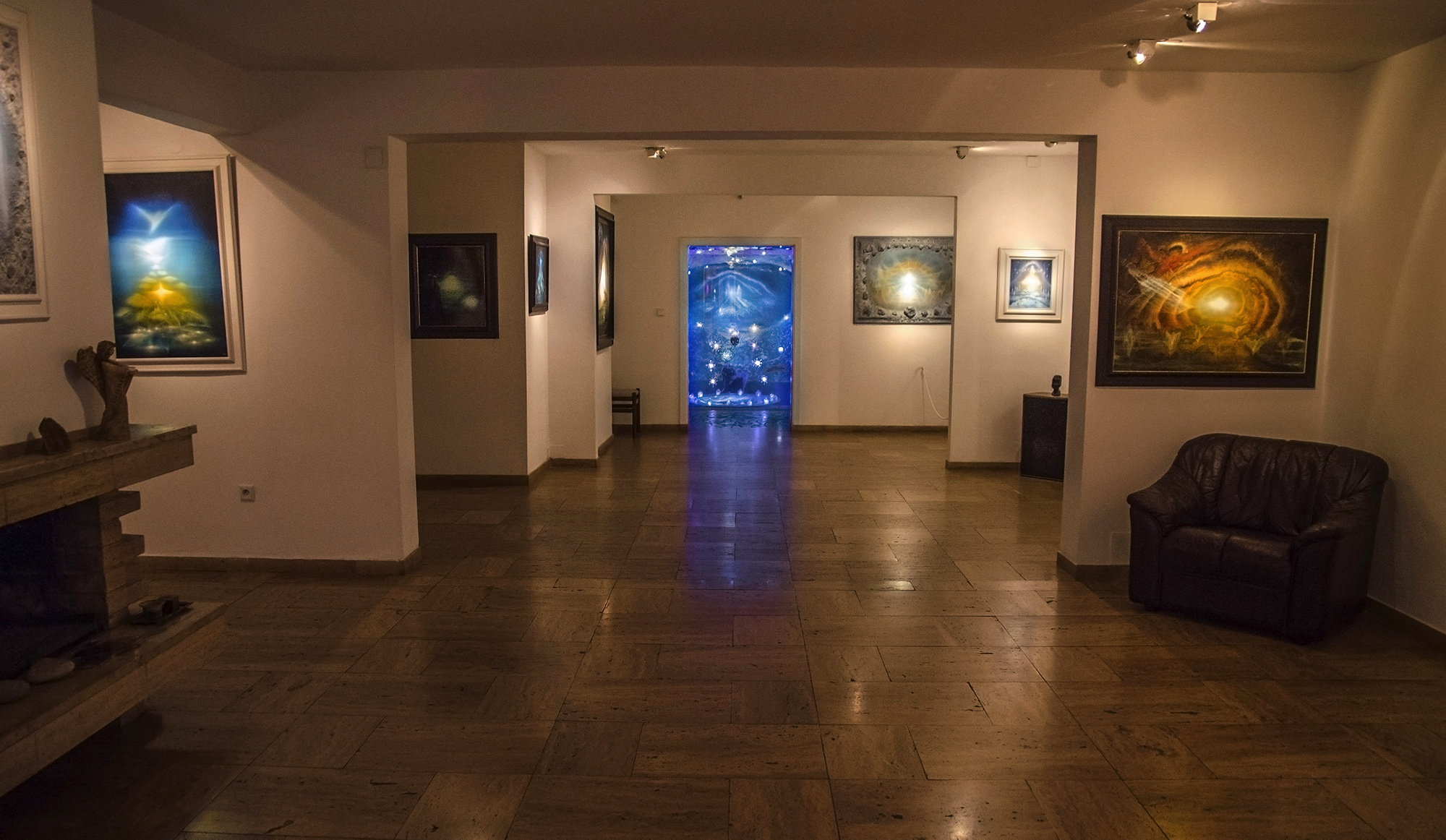
- Interactive fullscreen map
- Established: 1994; 32 years ago
- Location: Zakouřilova 955, Prague, Czech Republic, 149 00
- Coordinates: 50°1′58.66″N 14°29′39.18″E
- Website: http://www.zdenekhajny.com/cz/fs14-uvod.html

Galerie Cesty ke světlu is a modern art gallery in Prague. It was founded by the Czech painter and psychologist Zdeněk Hajný in 1994. It covers the work of the artist and includes Cristal caffetery used for spiritual lectures.
