= The Fantastic Conquerors series =

Novel series by Philippe Ebly

The Fantastic Conquerors (Les Conquérants de l'impossible) is the first Philippe Ebly's series, beginning in 1971. It is also the longest, with 19 novels (and 2 more that are yet to be published). It was first published in the famous Bibliothèque Verte collection (Hachette publishing), then partially reprinted by Degliame Publishing. In the 1990s, some titles were rewritten and actualized by Philippe Ebly himself and reprinted in the Bibliothèque Verte collection (revised).

== The novels ==
- The Road to Uruapan (Destination Uruapan, 1971, revised 1995, Hachette)
- The One That Made It So Far (Celui qui revenait de loin, 1972, revised 1993, Hachette)
- The Flash That Erased It All (L'éclair qui effaçait tout, 1972, revised 2002, Degliame)
- The Year 2 Castaway (L'évadé de l'an II, 1973, revised 2003, Degliame)
- Stealing The Black Diamond (Pour sauver le Diamant Noir, 1973, revised 1995, Hachette)
- ... And Martians Welcomed Earthlings (... et les Martiens invitèrent les Hommes, 1974, Hachette)
- The Ship That Sailed Back through Time (La navire qui remontait le temps, 1974, revised 1994, Hachette)
- The Town That Wouldn't Exist (La ville qui n'existait pas, 1975, revised 2003, Degliame)
- The Invisible Shell (La voûte invisible, 1976, revised 1996, Hachette; revised 2002, Degliame)
- The Island That Came from Nowhere (L'île surgie de la mer, 1977, revised 2003, Degliame)
- The Robot That Ran Away (Le robot qui vivait sa vie, 1978)
- The Da Vinci Rescue (SOS Léonard de Vinci, 1979, revised 2003, Degliame)
- The Star shipwrecked (Le naufragé des étoiles, 1980)
- The Dawn of the Dinosaurs (Le matin des dinosaures, 1982, revised 2004, Degliame)
- The Great Fear of 2117 (La Grande Peur de l'an 2117, 1983)
- 2159, the End of the Confusion (2159, la fin des temps troublés, 1985)
- The 2187's Outcasts (Les parias de l'an 2187, 1986)
- The Computer That Sowed Disorder (L'ordinateur qui semait le désordre, 1986, revised 2004, Degliame)
- One Way Trip (Mission sans retour, 1996, revised 2004, Degliame)
- The Aquarian Captive (Le prisonnier de l'eau, 2007, Temps Impossibles)
- The Dog That Mewed (Le chien qui miaulait, unpublished)

Some titles were translated in Spanish, Japanese, German, and in Mandarin.

== Roleplaying gamebook ==
- Robots Mountain (1987)
- Octopus Island (1987)
- Red Planet (Unpublished)

== The characters ==
The main characters are three teenagers that could be seen as only one character with three components: Understanding (Serge), Insight (Xolotl), Strength (Thibaut). Raoul and Marc were two brothers that soon left the series: without real personalities, they were mainly acted as the candid ones. Souhi was the female teenager that appeared very lately in the series. She never really made the cut in the male team, and is still considered as a flat guest.

- Serge Daspremont : a French teenager that got abducted in the United States and was left to die in the Yucatán Desert. He escaped and met...
- Xolotl : a Mexican teenager. Being an orphan and having just lost a twin brother, Xolotl was desperate and wanted to fly away from every painful memory. Serge persuaded his father to adopt Xolotl because Serge didn't want him to stay alone in Mexico.
- Thibaut De Chalus : is also a teenager, son of a French Duke. The Duke was mortally wounded during the siege of his castle by Richard Lion's Heart and asked his son to escape the siege. Thibaut reluctantly accepted, but he was chased and fall into a glowing and very cold pit. When he woke up he met Serge who pretended to be his friend. Thibaut escaped, but discovered later that Serge and Xolotl were indeed his only friends in a very strange land, and that his former life and land and time were no more.
- Raoul Forestier
- Marc Forestier
- Souhi

== Functions ==
As in many stories for the young readers, less important characters often seem to perform a function rather than to act as full 3D individuals. There are archetypes that can easily be sorted.

The Scholar

The more blatant illustration of this is The Scholar. It is often a scientist, the one that knows and delegate, order the mission. In many novels, this role is fulfilled by Professor Auvernaux, who can be labelled as a father figure for Serge, Xolotl and Thibaut. If Professor Auvernaux isn't in the story, his function will be performed by a duplicate, as in The Ship That Sailed Back through Time (Doctor Danielle), or in The Dawn of The Dinosaurs (Professor Martigny).

- Professor Auvernaux
- Professor Lorenzo (The Flash That Erased It All; And The Martians Welcomed The Earthings)
- Doctor Danielle (The Ship That Sails Back Through Time)
- Professor Mouret (The Robot That Ran Away)
- Professor Martigny (The Dawn of the Dinosaurs)

The Little One

Also often found in the novels is the Little One (like Silou, the small Martian in ...And Martians Welcomed Earthlings, or Bruno, the baby bears in The Town That Wouldn’t Exist, or the weird catlike creature in The Starshipwrecked). Sometime this function will be performed by a boy, like Gaius in The Flash That Erased It All, or Christian in The Starshipwrecked.

- Gaius (The Flash That Erased It All)
- Silou (And the Martians Welcomed the Earthlings)
- Bruno (The Town That Wouldn't Exist)

The Implied Adversary

The Implied Adversary would intervene as an obstacle in the quest. This one can turned into the Unexpected Ally before the end of the adventure. It is quite outstanding that three main characters like Xolotl, Thibaut and Souhi fulfilled this role when they first appeared in the series.

- Sandro (And the Martians Welcomed the Earthlings)
- Tenes (The Island That Came From Nowhere)

The Vector

The Vector is the thing that would urge the heroes into their new quest. It can be used purposely but also used inadvertently. The Vector in the Fantastic Conquerors it is always a kind of technological miracle, but in the twin series The Time Castaways, it would be a supernatural way or medium.

The Purpose

The purpose is the target of the mission. The mission can be either a circular quest (The heroes arrive, explore then leave as in ...And The Martians Welcomed Earthlings) or a linear quest (The heroes are going from A to B in Time or in Space as in 2159, The End Of Confusion).

These narrative features can be also found in the two other Ebly's series, The Time Runaways and The 4003 Patrol, even if their universes are less developed.
