= Senator Osborn =

Senator Osborn may refer to:

- Andrew L. Osborn (1815–1891), Indiana State Senate
- Jones Osborn (1921–2014), Arizona State Senate
- Ralph Osborn (1780–1835), Ohio State Senate
- Thomas W. Osborn (1833–1898), U.S. Senator from Florida

== See also ==
- Senator Osborne (disambiguation)
