= Antonio Hidalgo (forward, born 1943) =

Spanish footballer

Personal information
- Full name: Antonio Hidalgo De Carlos
- Date of birth: 16 February 1943 (age 83)
- Place of birth: Alfajarín, Spain
- Position: Forward

Senior career*
Years	Team	Apps	(Gls)
1967–1969	Real Zaragoza	8	(2)
1969–1970	Granada	20	(3)
1970–1971	Calvo Sotelo	11	(2)
1971–1972	Villarreal	20	(2)
Total		59	(9)
- * Club domestic league appearances and goals

Antonio Hidalgo De Carlos (born 16 February 1943) is a Spanish former professional footballer who played as a forward.

== Career ==
Born in Alfajarín, Hidalgo played for Real Zaragoza, Granada, Calvo Sotelo and Villarreal.
