= Elbert Gill =

American chiropractor and politician (1931–2014)

Member of the Tennessee House of Representatives
- In office January 10, 1967 – January 13, 1987
- Preceded by: Jack McNeil (redistricted)
- Succeeded by: Guy Cain
- Constituency: Shelby, 7th (1967-1973); 79th district (1973-1975); 88th district (1975-1987)

Personal details
- Born: August 23, 1931
- Died: March 29, 2014 (aged 82)
- Party: Democratic
- Spouse: Grace
- Children: 6
- Education: Palmer College of Chiropractic
- Website: House website

Elbert T. Gill, Jr. (August 23, 1931 – March 29, 2014) was an American chiropractor and politician.

From Memphis, Tennessee, Gill went to the William R. Moore School of Technology and the Palmer College of Chiropractic. He was a chiropractor. He served in the Tennessee House of Representatives from 1966 to 1986 as a Democrat. In 1987, Gill was appointed Tennessee Commissioner of Conservation and served until 1991.
