= Bill Icke =

Australian rules footballer

Personal information
- Full name: William George Icke
- Born: 11 January 1921; Ballarat, Victoria
- Died: 14 March 2014 (aged 93)
- Original team: Forrest
- Height: 180 cm (5 ft 11 in)
- Weight: 80 kg (176 lb)

Playing career^{1}
Years	Club	Games (Goals)
1943	South Melbourne	2 (0)
1946	Geelong	14 (1)
Total		16 (1)
- ^{1} Playing statistics correct to the end of 1946.

William George Icke (11 January 1921 – 14 March 2014) was an Australian rules footballer who played with South Melbourne and Geelong in the Victorian Football League (VFL).
