= Kostis Papagiorgis =

Kostis Papagiorgis (Greek: Κωστής Παπαγιώργης; real name: Κωνσταντίνος Παπαγεωργίου Konstantinos Papageorgiou; 20 March 1947 – 21 March 2014) was a Greek essayist, columnist and translator of philosophical studies.

== Biography ==
A teacher's son, Papagiorgis was born on 20 March 1947 in Neochori, Ypati, Phthiotis, and lived in Kymi (1951–1960), Chalandri, Thessaloníki (1966–1967), and Paris (1969–1975).

He attended law school in Thessaloníki and philosophy in Paris, without, however, completing his studies. He began writing and translating in the latter half of the 1970s, while at the same time working in publishing. He published the theoretical magazine Chora. He began writing essays in 1987.

In 2002, he was honored with the Greek National Literary Award (Greece's most prestigious literary award) for his work Kanellos Deligiannis.

Papagiorgis spent the last years of his life in Athens with his wife Rania Stathopoulou and wrote for the Greek free newspaper LiFO.

He died in Athens in 2014.
