= Antonio Hidalgo López =

Undersecretary of the Spanish presidency

Antonio Hidalgo López is the Undersecretary of the Presidency, Relations with the Courts and Equality of the Spain. He is a high-ranking official of the Ministry of the Presidency of Spain.
