= Joseph Kenton =

American politician

Member of the U.S. House of Representatives from Missouri's 32nd district

Missouri House of Representatives
- In office 1973–1985

Personal details
- Born: 1921 Kansas City, Missouri, US
- Died: 2014 (aged 92–93)
- Party: Democratic
- Children: 6
- Occupation: manufacturer's representative

Joseph S. Kenton (September 11, 1921 - March 20, 2014) was an American Democratic politician who served in the Missouri House of Representatives. He was born in Kansas City, Missouri, and was educated in Kansas City Junior College, Washington University, and University of Missouri–Kansas City. He served in the United States Navy during World War II, serving between 1941 and 1946. Kenton worked as a postage stamp dealer for 41 years.
