= Ron Stott =

American politician

Ronald A. Stott (March 4, 1938 – March 29, 2014) was an American businessman and politician.

Born in Buffalo, New York, Stott served in the United States Marine Corps. He received his bachelor's degree from University of Arizona and was one of the founders of Datacom Systems Inc. in East Syracuse, New York and was an engineer for General Electric. Stott served as Mayor of North Syracuse, New York from 1971 to 1974. He also served as a county legislator in Onondaga County, New York. Stott served in the New York Assembly, in 1975, as a Democrat.
