= Jürg Neuenschwander =

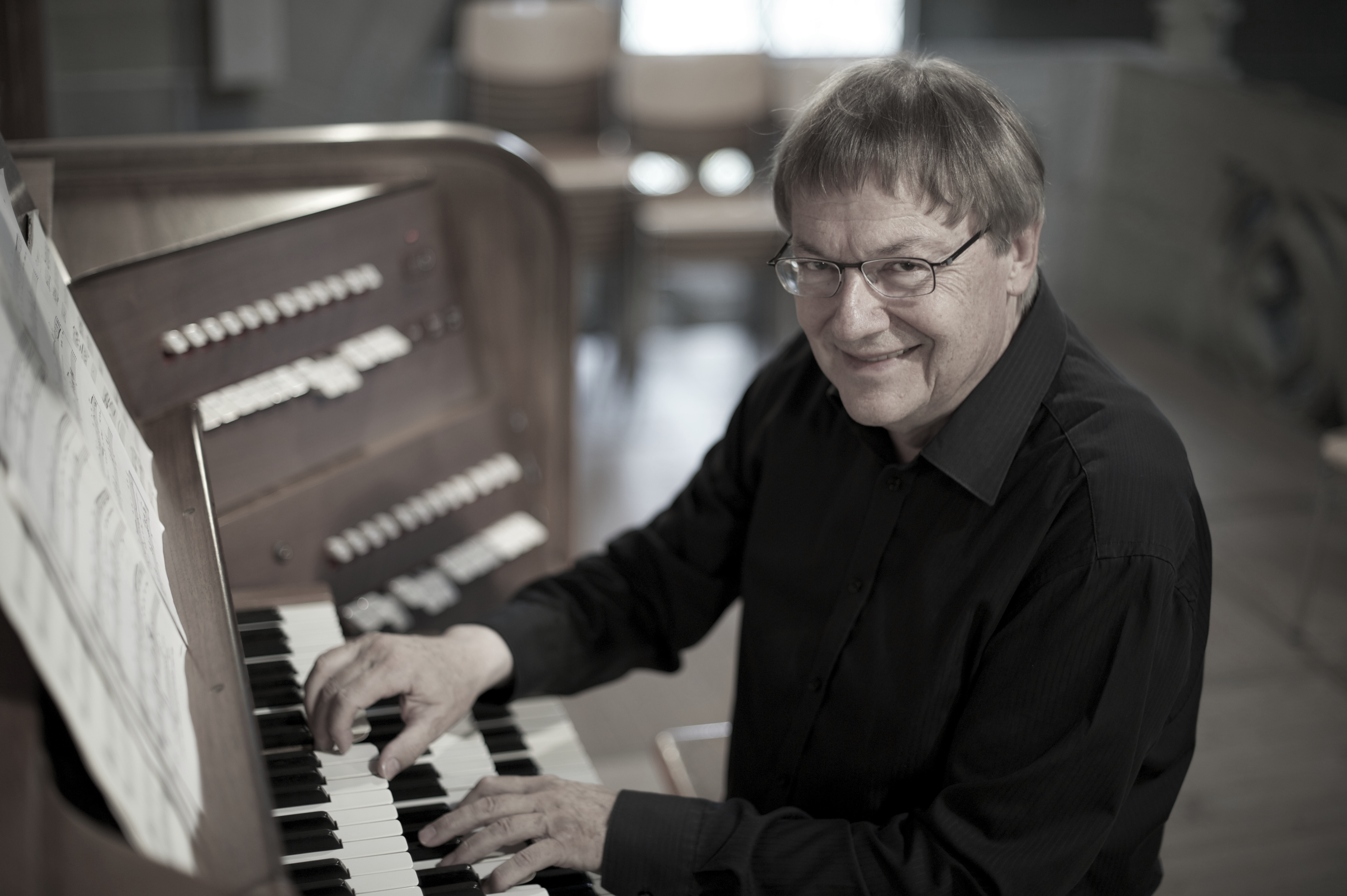
Neuenschwander in July 2012.

Jürg Neuenschwander (14 January 1947 – 23 March 2014) was a Swiss organist and musician. He was best known for his work with Schweizer Radio DRS from 1982 to 1989. He was born in Eggiwil, canton of Bern.

Neuenschwander died from a cerebral hemorrhage on 23 March 2014 in Bern. He was 67 years old.
