= Hank Utley =

American baseball author and historian

Robert Gerald "Hank" Utley (March 22, 1924 – March 19, 2014) was a baseball author and historian.

== Personal life ==
Utley was born in Concord, North Carolina, and graduated from Concord High School. He served with the U.S. Army Air Corps during World War II as a second lieutenant bombardier. After serving in the military, he attended North Carolina State University, where he played baseball. He died in High Point, North Carolina.

== Baseball endeavours ==
A member of the Society for American Baseball Research, Utley possessed a nationally known collection of Hank Greenberg photographs and memorabilia. In 1999, his book - co-authored with Scott Verner - The Independent Carolina Baseball League, 1936-1938 was published by McFarland Press. In 2006, he co-authored Outlaw Ballplayers with Tim Peeler and Aaron Peeler. It, too, was published by McFarland Press.

== Other endeavours ==
His efforts as executive director of what was initially called the Boys Club made it possible for girls to join the institution. He served in that capacity from the mid-1970s to the mid-1980s.
