= Hamza Abu al-Haija =

Al-Qassam Brigades commander (1990s–2014)

- Born: 1991/1992
- Died: 22 March 2014 (aged 22); Jenin, West Bank
- Cause of death: IDF attack
- Other name: "Hamzi"
- Military career
- Branch: Al-Qassam Brigades
- Rank: Commander

Hamza Abu al-Haija (also "Hamzi"; 1991/1992 – 22 March 2014) was an Al-Qassam Brigades commander killed by Israel Defense Forces.

== Biography ==
In 1991 or 1992, Hamza Abu al-Haija was born the youngest son of Asmaa and sheikh Jamal Abu al-Haija. By June 2003, both of al-Haija's parents and three brothers were in Israeli jail.

As an adult, al-Haija was a commander in the Izz ad-Din al-Qassam Brigades, wanted by Israeli authorities for "shooting and bombing attacks as well as planning future attacks". On 18 December, al-Haija escaped an Israel Defense Forces (IDF) raid on his home in the Jenin, West Bank refugee camp, though his friend Nafaa Saidi was killed by soldiers. It was around 3:00 A.M. on 22 March 2014 (UTC+02:00) when the IDF caught up with him in-camp, and after the Hamas leader exhausted his ammunition, the 22-year-old was killed by the IDF.
