= Vladislav David =

Czech attorney and lawyer

- Born: 12 August 1927; Brno, Czechoslovakia
- Died: 11 March 2014 (aged 86); Olomouc, Czech Republic
- Education: Masaryk University
- Scientific career
- Fields: international public law
- Workplaces: Palacký University of Olomouc

Vladislav David (12 August 1927 – 11 March 2014) was a Czech lawyer and leading professor of public international law in the Czech Republic.

== Biography ==
After finishing high school in 1946, Vladislav David entered the Faculty of Law of Masaryk University in Brno. At that time, Masaryk University Faculty of Law hosted a number of leading Czech law scholars, such as František Weyer or Hynek Bulín. David decided for academic career as assistant of the latter, however the communist persecution, which came after 1948 coup d'état, led to closure of the faculty in 1950. David then moved to Prague, aiming at academic career at the Charles University, however that didn't happen. He resigned on law profession and continued his life as journalist.

The communists eased the grip on society in the 1960s in what is known as Prague Spring. Vladislav David took part in reopening of the Brno Faculty of Law. He started as assistant at the Department of International Law, and eventually became the head of the department. In 1975 he defended his dissertation at Faculty of Law of Comenius University in Bratislava and in 1981 he became also Doctor of Science. Apart from his duties in Brno, he held lectures also at the law faculties of University of Pavol Jozef Šafárik, Charles University, University of Leipzig, University of Copenhagen, Taras Shevchenko National University of Kyiv and University of Wrocław.

At the age of 65 he left the university activities and concentrated on advocacy. However, a few years later he returned to academic career and became professor of international law at the Palacký University of Olomouc Faculty of Law. Up to his final days, he was lecturing there, being also vigorously active in scientific work regarding issues of war conflicts, international terrorism and European law.

David's textbooks on public international law are used as primary teaching material at law faculties in the Czech Republic as well as in Slovakia.

In 2007 Vladislav David became Doctor honoris causa of Palacký University of Olomouc. On 19 February 2014, the university's management agreed to award David with the status of Professor Emeritus, however, he died on 11 March 2014 from Natural Causes at the age of 86, before the ceremony could take place.

== Sources ==
- (in Czech) Alexander Nett: K osmdesátinám Vladislava Davida, Bulletin advokacie 7-8/2007
- (in Czech) Univerzita Palackého v Olomouci - Čestné doktoráty: Vladislav David
- (in Czech) Univerzita Palackého v Olomouci: Zemřel profesor Vladislav David
