= Richard Dermer =

American restaurateur (1939–2014)

Richard Dermer (June 19, 1939 – March 14, 2014) was an American restaurateur and founder of Hideaway Pizza.

Dermer was born in Stillwater, Oklahoma in 1939. He attended and graduated at Oklahoma State University. While attending university, in 1957 Dermer opened the original Hideaway Pizza outlet, in Stillwater; it was the second pizzeria in the city. Subsequently, Dermer opened a second Hideaway Pizza outlet in Tulsa, Oklahoma, and the business expanded from there.

He was an enthusiast for kite flying. He was nicknamed "The Big Kahuna". He died in hospital as the result of complications from previous health issues, aged 74.
