= B. Palaniappan =

Indian gynaecologist (1930–2014)

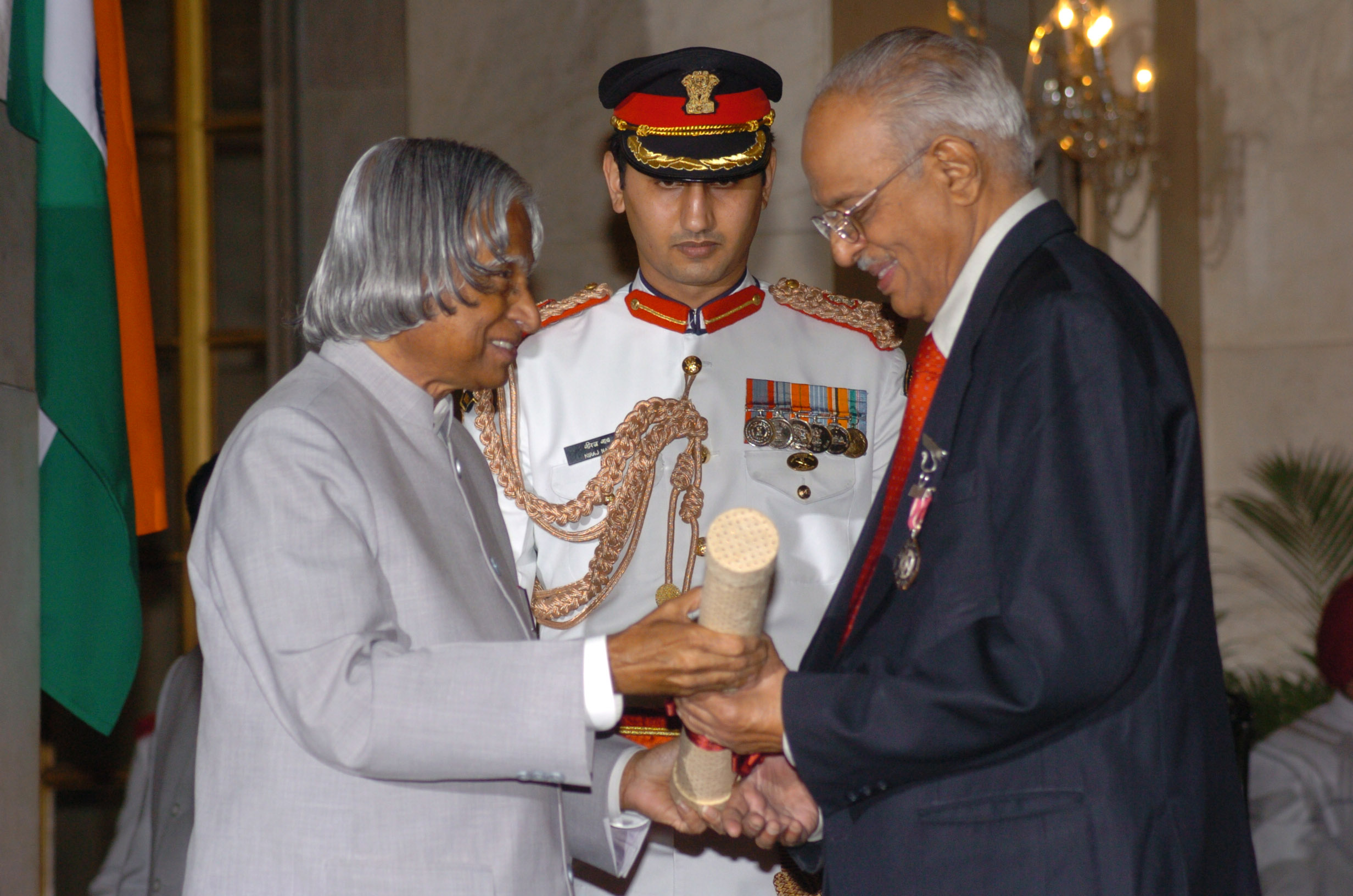
- The President, Dr. A.P.J. Abdul Kalam presenting Padma Shri to Dr. B. Palaniappan (right), at investiture ceremony in New Delhi on March 29, 2006
- Born: Bhuvaraghan Palaniappan; 5 November 1930
- Died: 23 March 2014 (aged 83)
- Occupation: gynecologist

Padma Shri.Bhuvaraghan Palaniappan (5 November 1930 – 23 March 2014) was an Indian gynecologist. In recognition of his contributions to medicine, Palaniappan received the Padma Shri award from then President of India, Abdul Kalam, on 29 March 2006. In a recent interview Dr. B. Palaniappan presents in a terse fashion what he considers as his major contribution at the national level to the welfare of child-bearing women in the second most populous country of the world and about the powerful influence he had among his students as a role-model; some of his students write to express appreciation from different parts of the world, which expressions he regards as his major accomplishment. Links to the 3 part interview: Part 1 Part 2 Part 3. As the President of The Obstetric and Gynaecological Society of Southern India (OGSSI) during 1983 Dr. BPL organized the All India Congress of the Obstetricians and Gynecologists at Chennai. Palaniappan was a Fellow of the National Academy of Medical Sciences. Palaniappan was the first Director of the Center of Excellence a Microsurgical Unit which was created on 24 June 1987 at Kilpauk Medical College and Hospital, Chennai which performed microsurgical tubal recanalisation which was very much beneficial to unfortunate loss of the child subsequent to sterilization and in infertile women including later benefited Tsunami victims. He was also honoured by the prestigious BC Roy Award by the Medical Council of India.
