= Philippe Ebly =

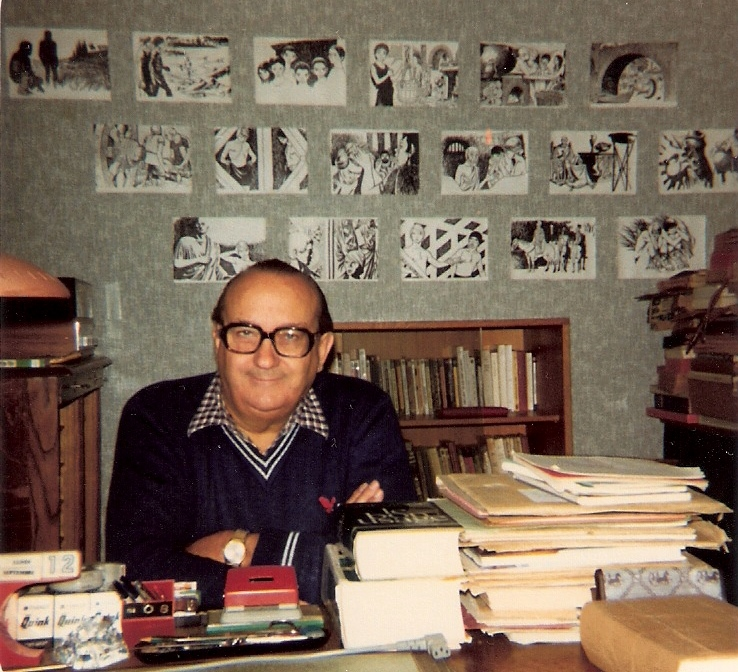
Ebly in 1983

Philippe Ebly (July 29, 1920 – March 1, 2014) was a Belgian science-fiction and fantasy writer born in Paris (France) and died in Liège.

== Novel series ==
- The Fantastic Conquerors Series (Les Conquérants de l'Impossible)
- The Time Runaways Series (Les évadés du Temps)
- The 4003 Patrol Series (Les Patrouilleurs de l'an 4003)

== Publishing houses ==
- French publishing houses
  - La Bibliothèque Verte (Hachette)
  - Les éditions Degliame
  - Temps Impossibles
- Belgian publishing house
  - Les éditions Averbodes
  - Les éditions Luc Pire
