= Valentin Fortunov =

Bulgarian politician (1957 -2014)

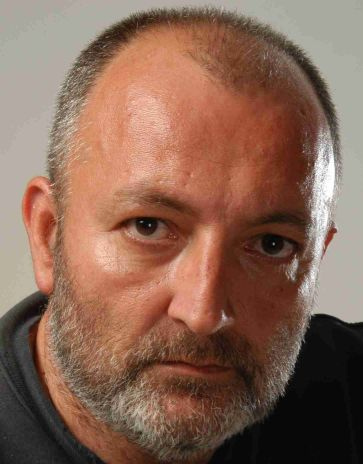
- Born: Valentin Ivanov Fortunov; 15 August 1957; Burgas, Bulgaria
- Died: 9 March 2014 (aged 56); Tvarditsa, Bulgaria
- Occupation: novelist
- Spouse: Diana Fortunova
- Children: Ivan, Zlatena, Alexander
- Writing career
- Genre: Thrillers
- Notable works: Vox Dei; Bastet
- Website: www.dolphin-press.net

Valentin Fortunov (Bulgarian Cyrillic, Валентин Фъртунов 15 August 1957 – 9 March 2014) was a Bulgarian writer, publisher and journalist.

== Career ==
Valentin Fortunov reported on the collapse of the Communist regime in Bulgaria. He wrote and published an unprecedented book from the last Bulgarian Communist president, Todor Zhivkov, shortly after his overthrow (Against Some Lies, Dolphin Press, Burgas, 1993).

In 1990, he founded Bulgaria's first private publishing company (Dolphin Press) and translated and published the works of many Western writers including John le Carré, Jeffrey Archer, Rex Stout, Dominick Dunne, Harold Robbins and others. He published a wide range of business books (translated from English) and introduced direct marketing to post-Communist Bulgaria.

He was General Editor of Dolphin's Dictionaries and Encyclopaedias series including over 30 hardcover volumes in all aspects of business and commercial law. Trud Publishing House released the new World Business Encyclopaedia, grand volume, for which Fortunov served as General Editor. He published under the pen name Maximillian Strugatzky (co-authoring with Artemida Senkevich) the first book of the multivolume International History of the Serial Killers – American Killers.

Besides his intellectual activities and wide interests and capacity, Fortunov wrote popular thrillers – Vox Dei and Bastet and his classical social mystery A Mystery at Christmas Time.

He was determined to finish his third thriller The Devil’s Aftershave.

Valentin Fortunov has an MA degree from Sofia University St. Climent Ohridski. He was fluent in English and Russian.

== Works ==
- Operation Vox Dei, 2005
- Bastet, 2005
- K like Killer, 2006
- Mystery at Christmas Time, 2007
