= Rodney E. Gutzler =

American politician

Member of the South Dakota House of Representatives
- In office 1977–1978

Personal details
- Born: July 21, 1946
- Died: March 19, 2014 (aged 67)
- Party: Republican
- Education: Huron College

Rodney E. Gutzler (July 21, 1946 – March 19, 2014) was an American politician. He served as a Republican member of the South Dakota House of Representatives.

== Life and career ==
Gutzler attended Huron College. Gutzler served in the South Dakota House of Representatives from 1977 to 1978. Gutzler died on March 19, 2014, at the age of 67.
