= Siddakatte Chennappa Shetty =

Yakshagana artist (1952–2014)

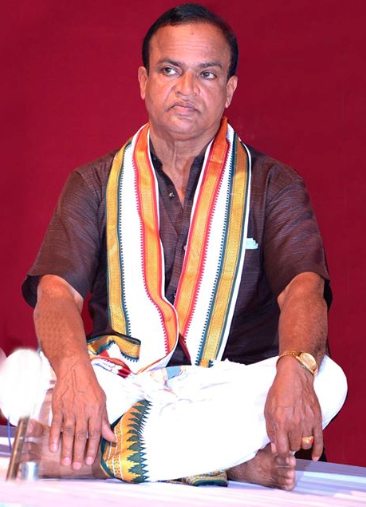
Siddakatte Chennappa Shetty in thala-maddale

Siddakatte Chennappa Shetty (born 8 May 1952 at Rayee village; died 22 March 2014 in Manipal, Mangalore) was a Yakshagana artist from Siddakatte, Bantwal Mangalore, Karnataka. Siddakatte was well known for his oratory skills in Yakshagana and Tala-Maddale (form of Yakshagana).

== Personal life ==
Chennappa Shetty was the second son of Vasu Shetty and Lingamma. He resided in Mavinakatte Bantwal with his wife Hemalatha and 3 sons Bharath, Bhuvan and Bhushan.

== Career ==
Siddakatte made his Yakshagana debut in 1965 after being trained at Yakshagana Kendra Dharmashala under the guidance of Kuriya Vittal Shastri and Padre Chandu. Thereafter, he moved to Dharmastala, Kadri, Bappanadu, Kumble and Madhur Mela. Focusing primarily on his oratory skills, took guidance from Kuthlodi Vasu Shetty, Dr.Prabhakar Joshi, Korgi Venkateshwara Upadhyaya and Dr.Shimanthoor Narayana Shetty. He admired and emulated Agari Shirinivas Bhagawatha's personality and lifestyle.

Badaguthittu (northern form) invited based on his popularity in south and oratory skills. He made his entry through Perdoor Mela and after to Saligrama. He learnt badagutittu naatya from Heranjalu Venkataramana. Siddakatte was one of the most successful artists who moved from thenkuthittu to badaguthittu. He came back to theenkuthittu through Yedaneer mela after working several years in badaguthittu.

Siddakatte was known for his knowledge on Ramayana, Mahabharatha, Bhagavatha and few other Indian literatures. People knew him because of his great voice, clean pronunciation and enunciation, tactical derivation of stories and sub-stories from Puranas in conversation, and utilization of proverbs and Sanskrit Shloka at appropriate situations in a timely manner.

== Awards ==
Siddakatte was solicited by different firms in India and in gulf countries. He was awarded Karnataka Rajyothsava district award in 2009. He was identified as "Mathina Malla" in Yakshagana and Tala-Maddale world.

== Death ==
Siddakatte died of a brain stroke on 22 March 2014 at Kasturba hospital Manipal, Mangalore.
