= Myles Conte =

South African cricketer (1947–2014)

Personal information
- Born: 4 April 1947; Johannesburg, South Africa
- Died: 12 March 2014 (aged 66); Nelspruit, South Africa
- Source: ESPNcricinfo, 13 May 2016

Myles Conte (4 April 1947 – 12 March 2014) was a South African cricketer. He played thirteen first-class matches for Transvaal between 1972 and 1977.
