= John Wayne Mason =

American physiologist

- Born: February 9, 1924; Chicago, Illinois, U.S.
- Died: March 4, 2014 (aged 90); Silver Spring, Maryland
- Education: Indiana University Bloomington
- Known for: Integrative psychoendocrinology
- Spouse: Joyce Ann Towne
- Awards: Nomination for Rockefeller Award (1973), Medal of the Pavlovian Society (1985), President's Award, American Psychosomatic Society (2000)
- Scientific career
- Fields: Physiology, psychoendocrinology, neuropsychiatry
- Workplaces: Walter Reed Army Institute of Research, West Haven VA Medical Center, Yale University School of Medicine

John Wayne Mason (February 9, 1924 – March 4, 2014) was an American physiologist and researcher who specialized in the interplay between human emotions and the endocrine system. Mason is regarded as an international leader and theoretician in the field of stress research, where he was one of the field's most prominent voices speaking out against the reigning model of stress promoted by Hans Selye.

== Challenging the Stress Concept ==
Hans Selye's original concept of stress as a biological process has had an enormously stimulating effect on many areas of medicine and biology over the past seventy years, and continues to shape how people understand stress today. While many researchers have taken Selye's experiments and interpretations at face value, Mason noticed that Selye repeatedly referred to emotional factors in these experiments as "mere nervous stimuli," downplaying the role of the mind. Yet Walter Cannon's prior work with animals, and Mason's own experiments at the Walter Reed Army Institute of Research (WRAIR) with both animals and human subjects, suggested that these "mere" stimuli were actually highly significant, and that the psychological and emotional state of the subjects under study required more careful attention.

Over the course of his career at the Walter Reed Army Institute of Research, the West Haven Veterans Affairs Medical Center, and Yale University, Mason repeatedly challenged Selye to recognize the many flaws in his biological theory and to accept the importance of psychological factors in stress and disease. Mason and Selye's exchange of arguments and rebuttals in the Journal of Human Stress, received popular press both at the time and more recently as a crucial turning point in the history of stress as a concept, and as the beginning of experimentally-validated integrative medicine.

He served in the United States Army, attaining the rank of major.

== Selected publications ==
- Mason JW. Psychological influences on the pituitary-adrenal cortical system. Recent Progress in Hormone Research 15:345-389, 1959.
- Wolff CT, Friedman SB, Hofer MA, Mason JW. Relationship between psychological defenses and mean urinary 17-OHCS excretion rates: Part I. A predictive study of parents of fatally ill children" Psychosomatic Medicine 26:576-591, 1964.
- Mason JW. Organization of Psychoendocrine Mechanisms" Psychosomatic Medicine 30:565-808,1968.
- Mason JW. Organization of the multiple endocrine responses to avoidance in the monkey" Psychosomatic Medicine 30:774-790, 1968.
- Mason, JW (1968). ""Overall" hormonal balance as a key to endocrine organization". Psychosomatic Medicine. 30 (5): 791–808. doi:10.1097/00006842-196809000-00033.
- Mason, JW (1970). "Strategy in psychosomatic research. Presidential Address, Annual Meeting of the American Psychosomatic Society, March 1970, Washington, DC". Psychosomatic Medicine. 32 (4): 427–439. doi:10.1097/00006842-197007000-00013. PMID 5514180.
- Mason, JW (1974). "The integrative approach in medicine—implications of neuroendocrine mechanisms.Wilson Day Medical Center, 13-29, 1972". Perspectives in Biology and Medicine. 17 (3): 333–347. doi:10.1353/pbm.1974.0066. PMID 4208315.
- Mason JW. Specificity in the organization of neuroendocrine response profiles. In Seeman P Brown G (Eds), Frontiers in Neuroscience and Neuroscience Research, University of Toronto Press: Toronto, pages 68-80, 1974
- Mason, JW; Giller, EL; Kosten, TR; Ostroff, RB; Podd, L (1986). "Urinary free-cortisol levels in posttraumatic stress disorder patients". Journal of Nervous and Mental Disease. 174 (3): 145–149. doi:10.1097/00005053-198603000-00003. PMID 3950596.
- Mason, JW; Kosten, TR; Giller, EL (1991). "Multidimensional hormonal discrimination of paranoid schizophrenic from bipolar manic patients". Biological Psychiatry. 29 (5): 457–466. doi:10.1016/0006-3223(91)90268-q. PMID 2018819.
- Mason, J; Southwick, S; Yehuda, R; Wang, S; Riney, S; Bremner, D; Johnson, D; Lubin, H; Blake, D; Zhou, G; Gusman, F; Charney, D (1994). "Elevation of serum free triiodothyronine, total triiodothyronine, thyroxine-binding globulin and total thyroxine levels in combat-related posttraumatic stress disorder". Archives of General Psychiatry. 51 (8): 629–641. doi:10.1001/archpsyc.1994.03950080041006.
- Mason, J; Wang, S; Yehuda, R; Riney, S; Charney, D; Southwick, S (2001). "Psychogenic lowering of urinary cortisol levels linked to emotional numbing and a shame-depressive syndrome in combat-related posttraumatic stress disorder". Psychosomatic Medicine. 63 (3): 387–401. doi:10.1097/00006842-200105000-00008. PMID 11382266.
- Mason, J; Wang, S; Yehuda, R; Lubin, H; Johnson, D; Bremner, JD; Riney, S; Charney, D; Southwick, S (2002). "Marked lability in urinary cortisol levels in sub-groups of combat veterans with posttraumatic stress disorder in an intensive exposure treatment program". Psychosomatic Medicine. 64 (2): 238–246. doi:10.1097/00006842-200203000-00006. PMID 11914439.
