= Eli Hunt =

American politician (1953–2014)

Eli Owen Hunt (June 13, 1953 – March 5, 2014) was a Native American leader of the Leech Lake Band of Ojibwe in Cass Lake, Minnesota, United States.

Born in Cass Lake, Minnesota, Hunt served as tribal chairman of the Leech Lake Band of Ojibwe from the late 1990s until his recall in 2002. He then worked in public relations for the Leech Lake Band. Hunt was also involved in the Democratic Party.
