= Ludomir Goździkiewicz =

Polish politician (1935–2014)

- Born: 13 March 1935; Łowicz, Warsaw Voivodeship, Poland
- Died: 10 March 2014 (aged 78)
- Political party: Polish People's Party

Ludomir Karol Goździkiewicz (13 March 1935 – 10 March 2014) was a Polish politician from the Polish People's Party. He served as member of the Sejm from 1989 to 1991.
