= Zdeněk Hajný =

Czech painter and artist (1942–2014)

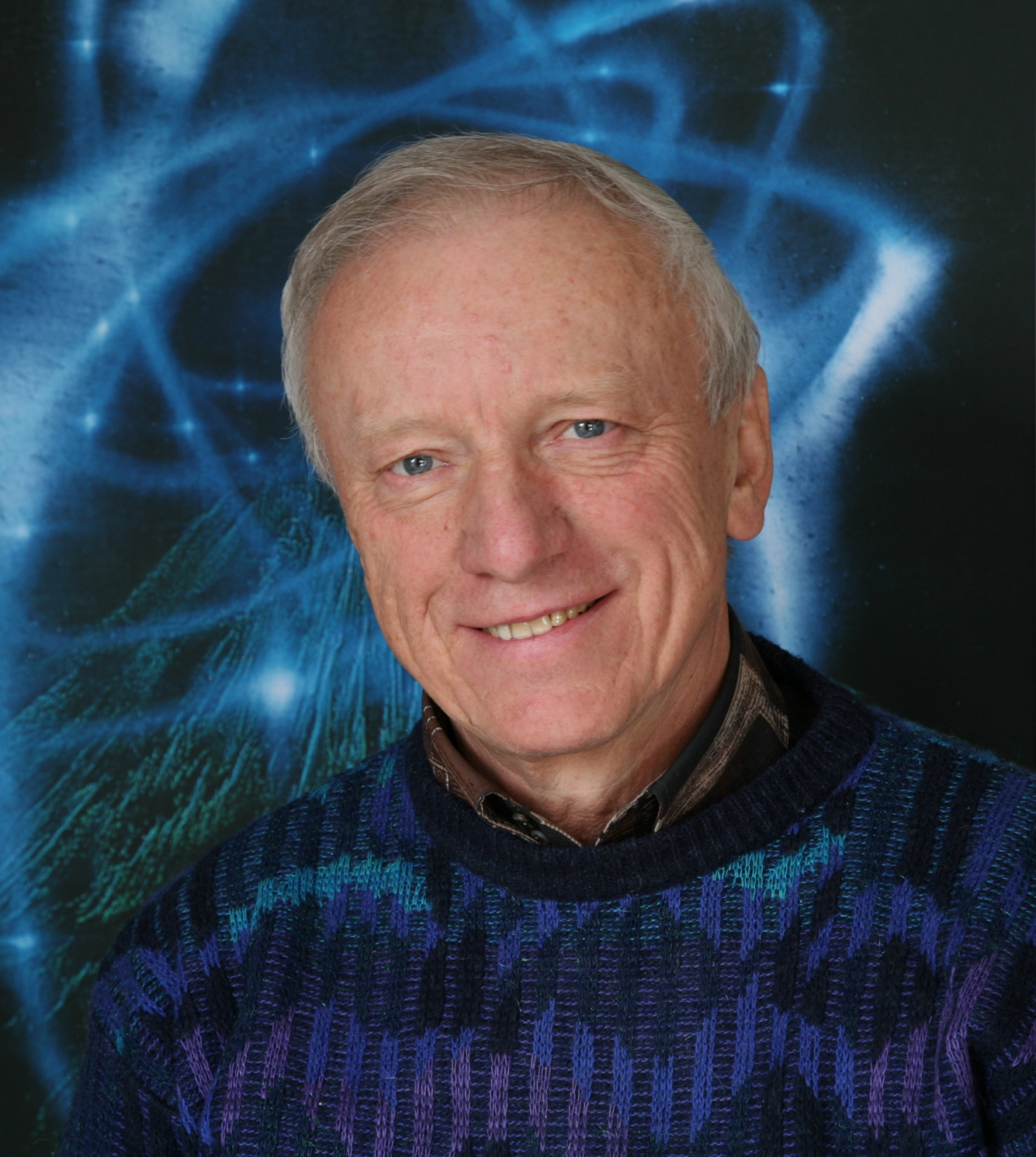
Zdeněk Hajný in 2010

Zdeněk Hajný (30 January 1942, Vsetín – 1 March 2014, Prague) was a Czech painter, graphic artist and psychologist. In 1994, he founded Galerie Cesty ke světlu.

== Other websites ==
- Official website (in Czech)
