= Andrew Kenneth Burroughs =

British physician, researcher and teacher

Andrew K. Burroughs (26 May 1953 in Beckenham, Kent – 15 March 2014) was a British physician, researcher and teacher. He is renowned for his wide contribution to the field of Hepatology; he has been termed one of the greatest hepatologists of our times and the true representative of Dame Sheila Sherlock's legacy.

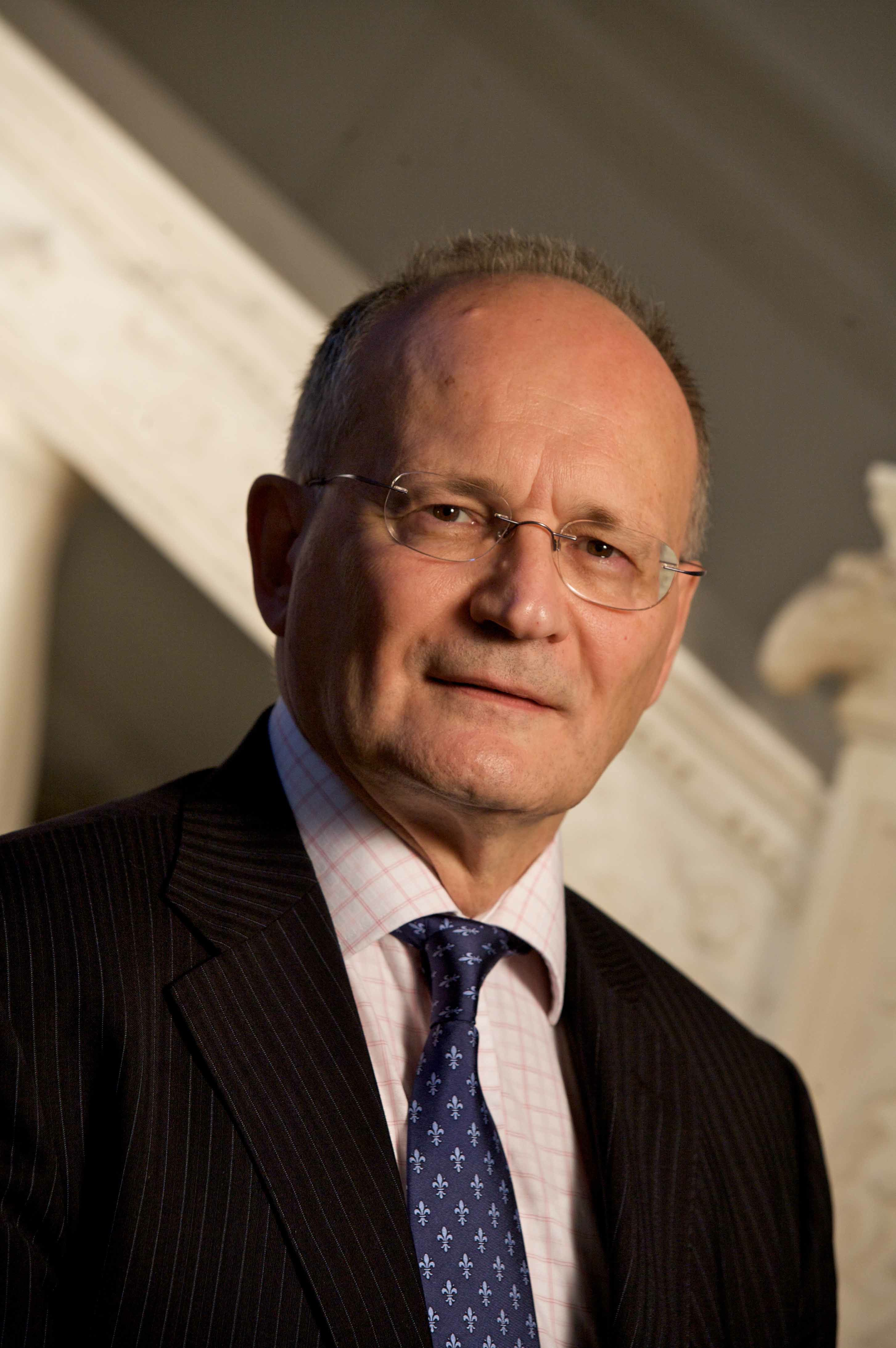
Andrew K. Burroughs

== Early life ==
Born to a British father and Italian mother, he was educated at the Overseas School of Rome until the age of 13 and then at Kent College in Canterbury from 1966 until 1971. He joined the Medical School of Liverpool University the same year. His ability and dedication became evident during his undergraduate years, and he achieved his MB ChB with Honours in 1976. He was awarded the Lyon Jones Senior Scholarship, the Bromley Undergraduate Scholarship, the Robert Grieve Memorial Prize in Anatomy, the Augusta Lipkin Prize in Biochemistry, the George Holt Bronze Medal in Physiology, the J Hill Abram Prize in Medicine, the Henry Briggs Memorial Prize in Obstetrics and Gynaecology and the William James Eastwood Prize in Orthopaedic Surgery. After working as a House Surgeon and House Physician at the Walton Hospital in Liverpool, he became a Senior House Office in Medicine at the Broadgreen Hospital of the same city, finally becoming a locum Senior Registrar in Gastroenterology at the Broadgreen Hospital for the last months of 1978.

== Career ==
He joined the Royal Free Hospital in London in January 1979 as Registrar in General Medicine and Gastroenterology under Sheila Sherlock, who is accredited with establishing the field of Hepatology. In April 1981 he first became an Honorary Lecturer in the same department, and in October 1983 a Lecturer and Honorary Senior Registrar both under Professor Sheila Sherlock and Professor Neil McIntyre. In January 1988, he became Senior Lecturer in Medicine and Honorary Consultant, and in November 1993 he was eventually appointed Consultant Physician at the Royal Free Hospital. In 1988, he set up the Liver Transplant service at the Royal Free Hospital together with Keith Rolles. In October 2002, he was awarded the title of Professor of Hepatology by the Royal Free and University College School of Medicine. He held important roles in national and international organizations, including being the EASL Secretary General (1997–1999), member of the Scientific Committee of the Baveno Meetings (1990–2013), Chairman of the European Liver and Intestine Organ Transplant Association (ELITA; 2009–2012), and Vice-President for Hepatology of the British Society of Gastroenterology.

== Research ==
His research involved almost all areas of Hepatology, in particular portal hypertension, primary biliary cirrhosis, liver transplantation, hepatocellular carcinoma, liver fibrosis, coagulation in liver disease and the role of bacterial infections in liver disease. He has authored more than 500 articles in peer reviewed journals, together with numerous editorials, book chapters and books. He has co-edited the 12th edition of Sherlock’s Diseases of the Liver and Biliary System and the 3rd edition of Evidence Based Gastroenterology and Hepatology.

== Education and mentorship ==
Following the tradition established by Sheila Sherlock, he was instrumental in ensuring that both British and foreign doctors and researchers could benefit from the substantial opportunities in scientific research and clinical experience at the Royal Free Hospital. Over one hundred fellows from 17 nations spent a period ranging from 3 months up to 3 years under his tutorship. Apart from conducting research resulting in the publication of numerous scholarly articles, this often led to the establishment and development of research projects and clinical centres of Hepatology in the respective countries of origin on their return.

== Promotion of public awareness and charitable work ==
He strongly promoted public awareness for the need of organ donation. In 2005, he collaborated with the BBC documentary "Life on the list" and he also initiated and oversaw the publication of "Thank you for life", a collection of letters from transplant recipients to donors' families, published in 2010 by the Royal College of Physicians. He was a member of the medical board of the PBC Foundation and served as a Trustee of the British Liver Trust.

== Honours ==
- Cavaliere Ufficiale dell'Ordine al Merito della Repubblica Italiana (Order of Merit of the Italian Republic)- Conferred June 1989
- Bengt Ihre Medal 2003 (Awarded by the Swedish medical society)
- Fellow of the Academy of Medical Sciences 2010
- NHS Platinum Clinical Excellence Award 2012
- Arthur Hurst lecture 2013
- European Association for the Study of the Liver (EASL) recognition award 2013
- British Association for the Study of the Liver (BASL) distinguished service award 2013
- International Liver Transplantation Society (ILTS) Distinguished Service Award 2014

== Personal life ==
He was married to his second wife, Clare Davey, and had three children. He enjoyed philately and science fiction.
