= Ali Anwar (writer) =

Bangladeshi writer

- Died: 3 March 2014 (aged 79); New York City, U.S.
- Occupations: Academic, writer

Ali Anwar (died 3 March 2014) was a Bangladeshi litterateur and translator. He served as a professor of the Department of English at the University of Rajshahi. He won the Bangla Academy Literary Award in 2006 in the essay category.

== Career ==
Anwar joined the University of Rajshahi as a faculty member in 1962 and retired in 2001. He translated the plays of many dramatists, including Euripides and Harold Pinter.
