= Dick Heller (sportswriter) =

American sportswriter and columnist (1938–2014)

Richard S. Heller (January 10, 1938 – March 20, 2014) was a longtime sportswriter and columnist for The Washington Times.

Richard S. Heller should not be confused with Dick Anthony Heller, the plaintiff in District of Columbia v. Heller.

== Journalism career ==
Heller began his career writing for The Washington Daily News while still in high school. He also served stints with the Richmond Times-Dispatch, the Alexandria Gazette and The Washington Star, with whom he remained until 1981. He then joined The Miami Herald before settling with The Washington Times in 1986. He remained with them until 2009, when the paper folded its sports section. After they brought the sports section back in 2011, he contributed bi-weekly columns. He also contributed to TheNationalPastimeMuseum.com after his retirement. He is credited with 'discovering' and popularizing The Sports Junkies.

=== Bilney v. Evening Star ===
In 1977, Heller – then writing for the Washington Star – published the names of four University of Maryland basketball team players who had poor academic records, alleging they were on academic probation. Six members of the team sued Heller, the Star and the school's newspaper for invasion of privacy, intentional infliction of emotional distress and other charges. They demanded $76 million. The Maryland Court of Special Appeals ruled in favor of Heller and the Star, holding that the publication was protected under principles of press freedom.

== Personal life ==
He was born in Washington, D.C. and died in Silver Spring, Maryland at age 76. He attended Woodward Prep and then briefly American University.
