= Alice Raftary =

American educator

- Alice Raftary, from a 2014 newspaper.
- Born: Alice Therese Geisler; September 2, 1927; Detroit, Michigan
- Died: March 30, 2014 (aged 86); Detroit, Michigan
- Occupation: Educator

Alice Geisler Raftary (September 2, 1927 – March 30, 2014) was an American educator, based in Detroit, who specialized in education and rehabilitation for newly blind adults.

== Early life ==
Alice Therese Geisler was born in Detroit, Michigan, the daughter of Anthony Jerome Geisler and Florence M. Geisler. Her father was a plumber, and president of the Michigan Association of Plumbing Contractors.

Geisler earned a bachelor's degree in nutrition at Marygrove College in 1949. She had vision issues from her youth, from macular degeneration, and became legally blind in 1960. "I knew that I would do something that would insure that none of my children would ever think that blindness must ruin their lives," she told an interviewer in 2014. Raftary returned to Marygrove as a married mother of eight, and earned a master's degree in education in 1967, focusing on blindness and rehabilitation.

== Career ==
Raftary became a rehabilitation teacher at the Greater Detroit Society for the Blind's Upshaw Institute in 1968. She was promoted to supervisory and coordinating jobs, and eventually became the institute's associate director. She spoke at conferences and wrote promotional and educational materials for the Upshaw Institute, including an award-winning filmstrip, "Valentines for Grandpa Raub" (1980). "Helping people to progress from hopelessness to confidence and competence is a thrill and a joy," she explained.

In 1982, Raftary received an award from the American Association of Workers for the Blind. Other awards for Raftary came from the Michigan chapter of the Association for Education and Rehabilitation of the Blind and Visually Impaired in 1991, and the Charlyn Allen Award from the Mid-America Conference of Rehabilitation Teachers (MACRT) in 1992. In 2002, she was inducted into the American Printing House for the Blind's Hall of Fame. She was also named a distinguished alumnus of Marygrove College.

== Personal life ==
Alice Geisler married Raymond H. Raftary in 1950. They had eight children together. Alice Raftary was a widow when she died in 2014, aged 86 years, in Detroit. The Association of Vision Rehabilitation Therapists established an award in her name, for emerging leaders in the field.
