= Sean Cusack =

Republic of Ireland footballer

Personal information
- Date of birth: 1926 or 1927
- Date of death: 30 March 2014 (aged 87)
- Position: Inside forward

Senior career*
Years	Team	Apps	(Gls)
1947–1956	Limerick	125	(30)

International career
1952	Republic of Ireland	1	(0)
	League of Ireland XI	4	
- * Club domestic league appearances and goals

Sean Cusack (born 1926 or 1927; died 30 March 2014) was a soccer player from Limerick in Ireland.

He spent his whole career at club level with his home town club, Limerick F.C. winning just one domestic honour with them, the League of Ireland Shield in 1953, scoring a penalty kick in their 3–2 win over Dundalk in the final at Oriel Park.

He represented the League of Ireland that played the Football League in April 1951.

Having played well against the English side he was called up to make his one and only appearance for the Republic of Ireland national football team on 16 November 1952 in a 1–1 draw with France at Dalymount Park.
