= Nana Abdullahi =

Nigerian judge and lawyer

High Court judge
- In office 2010 – 5 March 2014

Personal details
- Born: 1960
- Died: 5 March 2014
- Citizenship: Nigerian

Nana Aisha Abdullahi (c. 1960 – 5 March 2014) was a Nigerian judge and lawyer. In 2010, Abdullahi became Jigawa State's first female High Court judge. (Jigawa is a state located in northern Nigeria.)

== Biography ==
Abdullahi served as the Solicitor General, the Attorney General, and the Commissioner for Justice from 2000 to 2005. She was appointed to the High Court in 2010, becoming the first woman to serve as a High Court justice in Jigawa State. She held the post until her death in 2014.

Justice Nana Abdullahi died at a private hospital in Dutse, Jigawa, Nigeria, on 5 March 2014, at the age of 54.
