= Uwe Timm (libertarian author) =

German anarchist (1932–2014)

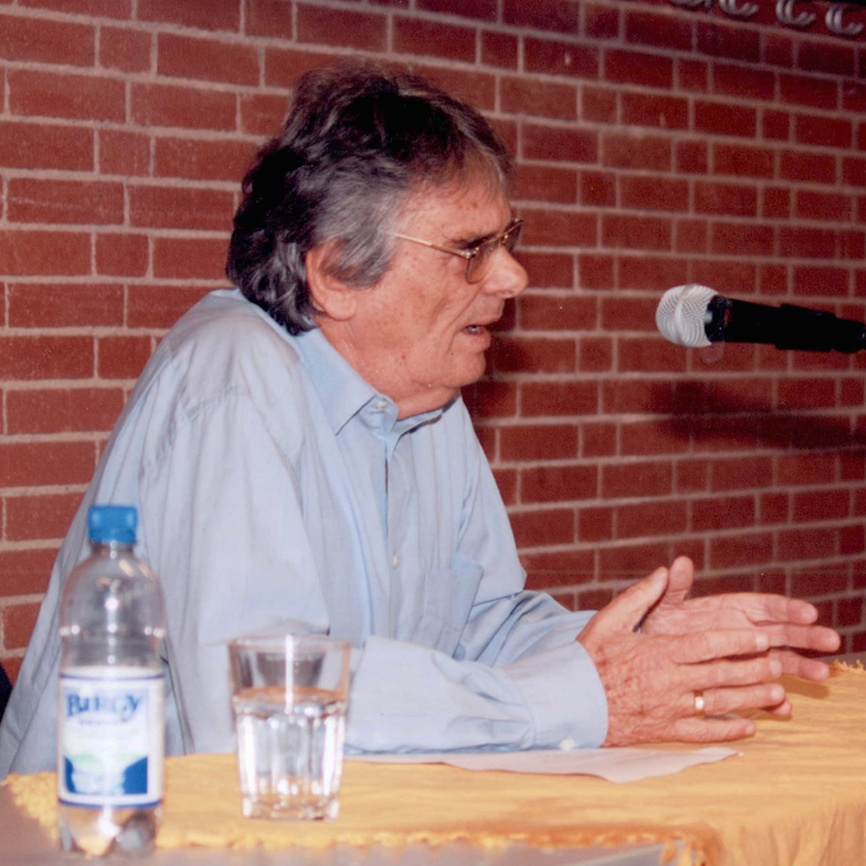
- Timm in October 2009
- Born: February 5, 1932; Hamburg, Weimar Republic
- Died: March 7, 2014 (aged 82); Barcelona, Catalonia, Kingdom of Spain
- Writing career
- Years active: 1954-2013
- Literary movement: Anarchism

Uwe Timm (5 February 1932 – 7 March 2014) was a German writer, anarchist, and anti-militarist. He was the co-editor of espero. He was born in Hamburg, Germany.

Timm died on 7 March 2014 in Barcelona, Spain. He was 82 years old.

== See also ==
- Anarchism in Germany

== Other websites ==
- Uwe Timm at the German National Library
