= Shun Lien Chuang =

Taiwanese-American electrical engineer, optical engineer and physicist

Shun Lien Chuang (Chinese: 莊順連, September 10, 1954 – March 26, 2014) was a Taiwanese-American electrical engineer, optical engineer, and physicist. He was a Fellow of the IEEE, OSA, APS and JSPS, and professor at the University of Illinois at Urbana-Champaign.

== Career ==
Chuang received a B.S. in electrical engineering from National Taiwan University (1976), and M.S. (1980), E.E. (1981), and Ph.D. (1983) degrees in electrical engineering from the Massachusetts Institute of Technology (MIT). In 1983, he joined the Department of Electrical and Computer Engineering (ECE) at the University of Illinois at Urbana-Champaign, where he remained until his retirement in 2012.

He is the author of a leading textbook on the physical theories for lasers and allied devices, Physics of Photonic Devices (2009).

== Awards and honors ==
Elected member of the Board of Governors, IEEE Photonics Society, 2009–2011.

Humboldt Senior Research Award, Humboldt Foundation, Germany, 2008–2009.

William Streifer Scientific Achievement Award, "For contributions to the development of the fundamental theories of strained quantum-well lasers and the physics of optoelectronics devices." IEEE Lasers and Electro-Optical Society (LEOS), 2007.

Engineering Excellence Award, Optical Society of America, 2004.

Distinguished Lecturer Award, IEEE/LEOS Society, 2004–2005; and 2005–2006.

Honorable Mention/Graduate and Professional Teaching Award, UIUC, 2004.

Fellow, American Physical Society, 2003, "For the development of the fundamental theories of strained quantum-well lasers and terahertz generation from semiconductors."

EPSRC Fellow/Visiting Professor 2002 at Cavendish Laboratory, Dept. of Physics, Cambridge University. Sponsored by Engineering and Physical Science Research Council, UK.

Fellow Award, IEEE, 1997, "For contributions to the theory of strained quantum-well semiconductor lasers and the physics of optoelectronic devices."

Fellow, Optical Society of America, 1997, "For contributions to the theories of strained quantum-well lasers and terahertz generation from semiconductors."

Fellow, Japan Society for the Promotion of Science, 1996.

Associate, The Center for Advanced Study at the University of Illinois, 1995–96

Andersen Consulting Award for Excellence in Advising, UIUC, 1994
