= Renée Richard =

French cheesemonger

Renée Françoise Jeanne Richard
- Born: 14 July 1928; Lyon, France
- Died: 31 March 2014 (aged 85); Lyon, France
- Occupation: Cheesemonger

Renée Françoise Jeanne Richard (14 July 1928 – 31 March 2014) was a renowned French cheesemonger in Lyon and the proprietor of La Mère Richard at Les Halles, 102 Cours Lafayette in Lyons.

== Biography ==
Renée Richard was born on July 14, 1928, in Lyon.

In 1965, she opened her first store in Les Halles des Cordeliers.

Chef Paul Bocuse included his cheese on his menu, specifying its name. He was the one who gave it the nickname “Mère Richard”.

He died on March 31, 2014, in Lyon, at the age of 85.

His daughter, also named Renée Richard, succeeded him (she died in January 2025).

== See also ==
- Mères of France
