= Tamás Nádas =

Hungarian aerobatics pilot (1969–2014)

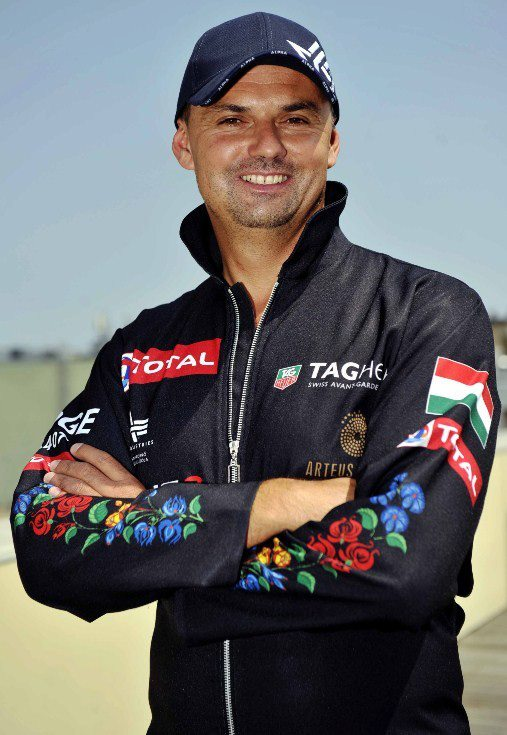
- Born: 20 March 1969
- Died: 7 March 2014 (aged 44); Al Khor Airfield, Doha-Qatar
- Cause of death: Aircraft crashed during an inverted flypast at the airfield
- Aviation career

Racing career
- Best position: 1st (10th FAI World Advanced Aerobatic Championship (programme free)| 2012)
- Aircraft: Edge 540T
- Website: nadastamas.hu

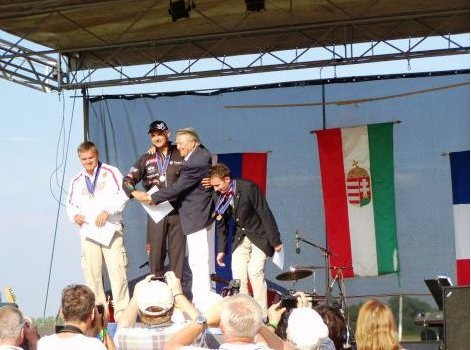
10th FAI World Advanced Aerobatic Championship Programme Free award ceremony. Gold medal: Tamás Nádas

Tamás Nádas (20 March 1969 – 7 March 2014) was a Hungarian aerobatics pilot and world champion air racer. He was born on 20 March 1969 in Hungary, and died when his plane crashed at an airshow in Qatar on 7 March 2014.

== History ==
In 1998, at the age of 29, Nádas became interested in flying thanks to a pleasure flight. He liked it so much that he started his pilot course that day. After a few months, he got his license.

He was not satisfied with this, so he got into a Z-142 and continued his aviation career by starting aerobatic training. His aerobatics training ended in 2001. He was trained to fly in several aircraft, including the YAK-18, YAK-52, Z-726, YAK-55M, ACRO-230, CAP-231 and Z-50LS and performed at several events in Hungary.

A milestone in his aviation career occurred in 2007 when his plane, an Extra EA-300 designed for perfect aerobatics arrived. This aircraft let him take part in different races as a worthy opponent. The years of learning and practising took their fruit in the year of 2009.

On 7 March 2014 he was taking part in the Qatar Mile event at Al Khor Airport. While flying his Zivko Edge 540 and doing an inverted low pass of the airport, he lost control and crashed into the runway. Nádas later died from his injuries, thirteen days away from his 45th birthday.

== Results ==
=== 2009 ===
- Hungarian Championship: gold medal
- European Championship programme Q: gold medal
- Czech Republic - international cup: silver medal
- Spain - Mediterranean cup: bronze medal

=== 2010 ===
- Hungarian Championship: gold medal
- World Championship: overall 8th place

=== 2011 ===
- Hungarian Championship: gold medal
- Republic of South Africa - season opener qualification aerobatics race: gold medal
- Hungarian Aviation Association: Aerobatics Pilot of the Year

=== 2012 ===
- Hungarian Championship: gold medal
- 10th FAI World Advanced Aerobatic Championship Programme Free: gold medal

=== 2013 ===
- Hungarian Aviation Association: Aerobatics Pilot of the Year
