= Hal M. Lattimore =

American judge

Hal M. Lattimore (October 13, 1920 – March 27, 2014) was an American jurist.

Born in Fort Worth, Texas, Lattimore flew transport planes during World War II, He then received his bachelor's degree from Baylor University and his law degree from University of Texas School of Law. He then practiced law. In 1973, Lattimore was appointed Texas District Court judge and then Texas Court of Appeals judge. He died in Fort Worth, Texas.
