= Rodney M. Coe =

American medical sociologist

- Born: Rodney Michael Coe; November 10, 1933; Marquette, Michigan, US
- Died: March 14, 2014 (aged 80); St. Louis, Missouri, US
- Education: Iowa State University; Southern Illinois University Carbondale; Washington University in St. Louis
- Occupation: Medical sociologist
- Medical career
- Institutions: Washington University in St. Louis; Saint Louis University School of Medicine

Rodney M. Coe (November 10, 1933 – March 14, 2014) was an American medical sociologist notable for his research in the intersection of sociology and medicine. He was on the faculty at Saint Louis University School of Medicine for 29 years, the last ten of which, Coe spent as chair of the department of family and community medicine. He was a longtime advocate for single-payer healthcare.

== Early life and education ==
Rodney Michael Coe was born November 10, 1933, in Marquette, Michigan. He was raised in a middle class household in Oskaloosa, Iowa. He had a younger sister. His family moved there when his father, Roy Coe, became a manager at S.S. Kresge Co. His mother, Renee Coe, was a telephone operator for AT&T. Coe was an Eagle Scout.

Coe was on the swim team and in the Army Reserve Officers' Training Corps while attending Iowa State University. He met and married Elaine Elwell while completing his undergraduate studies. Upon graduation, he spend two years, active duty, at Fort Riley. After his discharge, he earned a master's degree at Southern Illinois University Carbondale. In 1962, Coe completed a Ph.D. in sociology at Washington University in St. Louis in 1962 and was inducted into Phi Beta Kappa.

== Career ==
Coe obtained a faculty position at his alma mater where he remained until 1969. He left during a period of upheaval in the department of sociology spurred by faculty research on issues of economic and social power inequities and homosexual activities in restrooms. After a physical altercation between his colleagues Laud Humphreys and Alvin Ward Gouldner, where the instigator Gouldner was later exonerated by chancellor Thomas H. Eliot, Coe left the institution.

In 1969, he spent eight months at University of Chile United Nations Latin America as a member of the social sciences faculty. In the 1970s, Coe led efforts to remove lead paint from housing to prevent child lead poisoning.

Coe worked for 29 years at Saint Louis University School of Medicine. In 1989, he became chair of the department of family and community medicine where he developed residencies in family medicine, occupational medicine, and public health. Coe retired in 1999.

Coe was a longtime advocate for single-payer health insurance.

Coe authored several textbooks including Sociology of Medicine (1970), Community Medicine: Some New Perspectives (1978), and Endocrine Function and Aging (1990).

== Personal life ==
Coe continued swimming daily after college. He enjoyed golfing, gardening, and travelling. He had four children. In 1969, his family lived in Santiago for eight months during his time at University of Chile. Coe was involved with Meals on Wheels and the First Congregational Church in Webster Groves, Missouri. Coe was passionate about opera which lead him to support related cultural and philanthropic organizations. Coe resided in Webster Groves for over fifty years. Coe died March 14, 2014, at the Saint Louis University Hospital after a long illness.

== Selected works ==
- Coe, Rodney M. (1970). Sociology of Medicine. McGraw Hill Book Company. ISBN 978-0-07-011560-6.
- Coe, Rodney M.; Pepper, Max P. (1978). Community Medicine: Some New Perspectives. McGraw-Hill. ISBN 978-0-07-011548-4.
