= Wolfgang Kirchgässner =

German Roman Catholic bishop

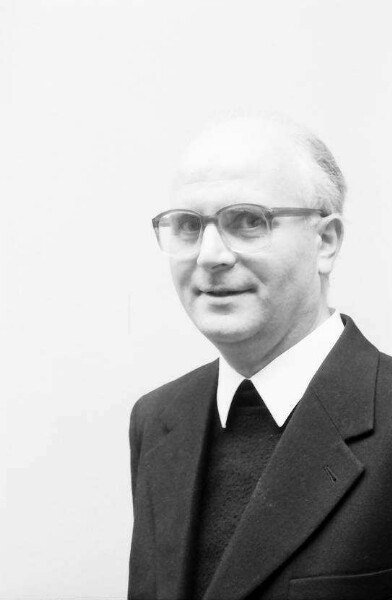
Wolfgang Kirchgässner

Wolfgang Kirchgässner (1 June 1928 – 26 March 2014) was a Catholic bishop.

Ordained to the priesthood in 1954, Kirchgässner was named titular bishop of Druas and auxiliary bishop of the Roman Catholic Archbishop of Freiburg, Germany. He resigned in 1998.
