= Werner Uebelmann =

Swiss writer and entrepreneur

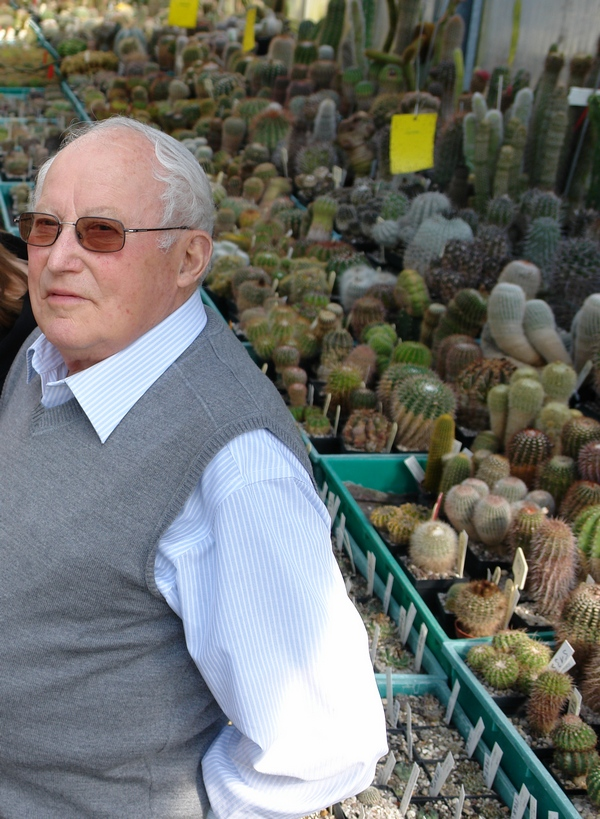
Uebelmann on 30 March 2008.

Werner J. Uebelmann (16 March 1921 – 1 March 2014) was a Swiss entrepreneur and writer. He was best known for his large collection of cactus. He was born in Aarau, Aargau.

Uebelmann died on 1 March 2014 in Muri, Aargau. He was 92 years old.

== Other websites ==
- Official website (in German)
