= Ferdinand Masset =

Swiss politician

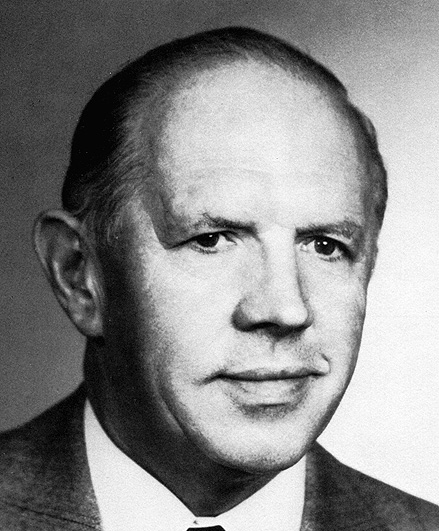
Masset in 1960

Ferdinand Masset (November 23, 1920 – March 31, 2014) was a Swiss politician of the Free Democratic Party of Switzerland. He was a member of the State Council of the Canton of Fribourg. He was born in Courtion.

Masset died in Fribourg from natural causes, aged 93.
