= Raili Tuominen-Hämäläinen =

Finnish gymnast

Personal information
- Nationality: Finnish
- Born: 13 October 1932 Tampere, Finland
- Died: 18 March 2014 (aged 81) Tampere, Finland

Sport
- Sport: Gymnastics

Raili Tuominen-Hämäläinen (13 October 1932 – 18 March 2014) was a Finnish gymnast. She competed at the 1952 Summer Olympics and the 1960 Summer Olympics.
