= Mark Freidkin =

Russian poet and writer (1953–2014)

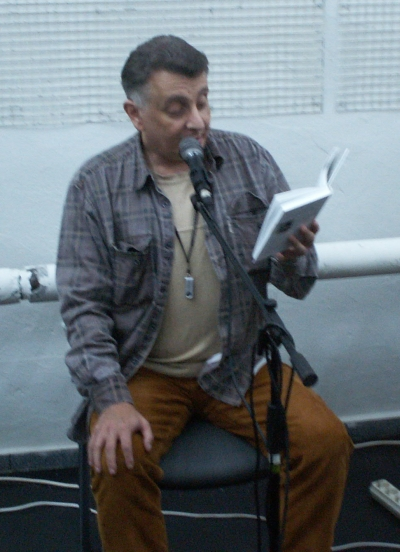
Mark Freidkin

Mark Iehielyevich Freidkin (Russian: Марк Иехиельевич Фрейдкин; 14 April 1953 – 4 March 2014) was a Russian poet, author, translator, and singer.

== Biography ==
Freidkin was born on 14 April 1953 in Leninobod (now Khujand, Tajikistan) and studied in the Moscow English School No. 9. He has translated poetry from both English (including Ben Jonson, Robert Burns, Thomas Hardy, Ezra Pound, Roald Dahl, and Edward Lear) and French (including Stéphane Mallarmé, Alfred Jarry, Raymond Roussel, and Georges Brassens). He was director of the "Carte Blanche" publishing house, which in the 1990s released several well-known books, including a collection of the works of Olga Sedakova. He was the director and owner of Moscow's first privately owned bookstore, "October 19th".

== Creative work ==
Freidkin has published three books of prose. In the past several decades, he has put to music poems written by himself as well as others; he has also worked on translating into Russian the songs of Georges Brassens. Freidkin performs his songs with the band "Goy", most of whose members, like him, studied at some point in the English school in North Moscow. He has performed several times in Germany, the US, France, and Israel.

== Books of prose (in Russian) ==
- «Главы из книги жизни» (Moscow, 1990)
- «Опыты» (Moscow, 1994)
  - «Записки брачного афериста»
  - «Из воспоминаний еврея-грузчика»
  - «Больничные арабески»
  - «Эскиз генеалогического древа»
  - «Книга ни о чем»
- «Песни» (Moscow, 2003)
- «Каша из топора» (Moscow, 2009)
  - «Искусство первого паса»
  - «Ex epistolis»
  - «История болезни, или Больничные арабески двадцать лет спустя»
  - «О Венедикте Ерофеевe»

== Translated works ==
- Х.Лофтинг «История доктора Дулитла» (Moscow, 1992)
- Э.Лир «Книга бессмыслиц» (Moscow, 1992; Kharkiv, 2008)
- Х.Беллок «Избранные назидательные стихотворения» (Moscow, 1994)
- Ж.Брассенс «Избранные песни» (Moscow, 1996)
- «Английская абсурдная поэзия» (Moscow, 1998; Saint Petersburg, 2007)
- Р.Даль «Детские бестселлеры» (Moscow, 2002)

== Albums ==
- «Эта собачья жизнь» (1997)
- «Песни Ж. Брассенса и запоздалые романсы» (1997)
- «Меж еще и уже» (2000)
- «Последние песни» (2002)
- «Король мудаков» (2005)
- «Блюз для дочурки» (2010)

=== Songs performed by others ===
- «Тонкий шрам на любимой попе» (2003) — Freidkin's songs performed by Andrey Makarevich, Maxim Leonidov, Evgeny Margulis, Tatiana Lasareva, Alyona Sviridova, and the Creole Tango Orchestra.
