= Kristian Mosegaard =

Danish footballer (1930-2014)

Personal information
- Date of birth: 3 December 1930
- Date of death: 20 March 2014 (aged 83)

International career
Years	Team	Apps	(Gls)
1957	Denmark	2	(0)

Kristian Mosegaard (3 December 1930 – 20 March 2014) was a Danish footballer. He played in two matches for the Denmark national football team in 1957.
