= Hideaway Pizza =

American pizzerias

Coordinates: 36.119491°N 97.06562°W

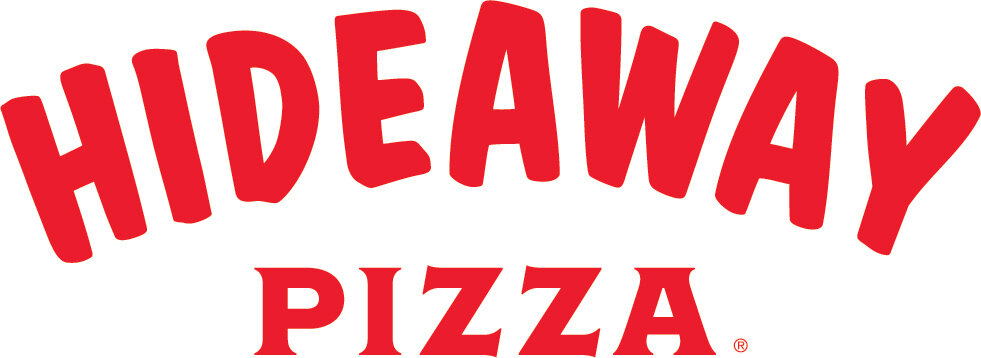
- Type: Private
- Industry: Pizzeria
- Founded: 1957; 69 years ago Stillwater, Oklahoma, U.S.
- Founder: Richard Dermer; Marti Dermer
- Headquarters: Tulsa, Oklahoma, U.S.
- Number of locations: 23
- Website: www.hideawaypizza.com www.thehideaway.net

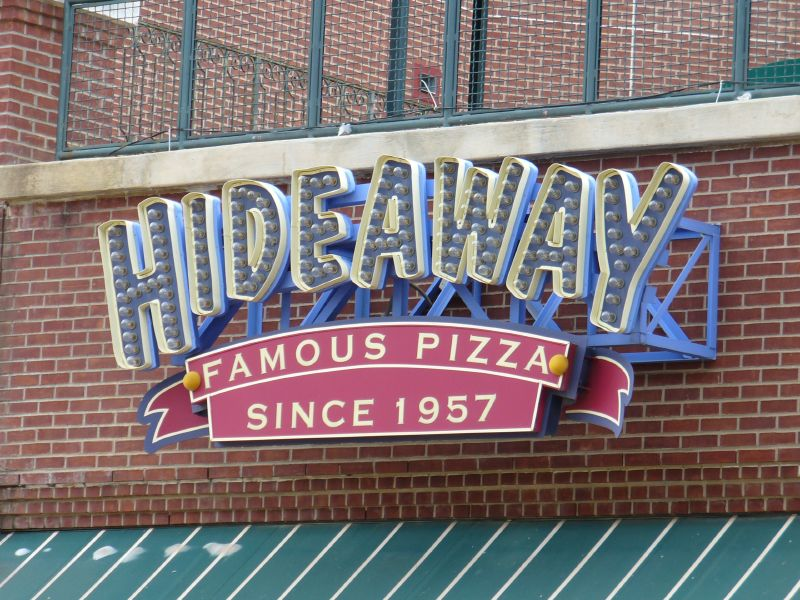
Sign for Hideaway Pizza

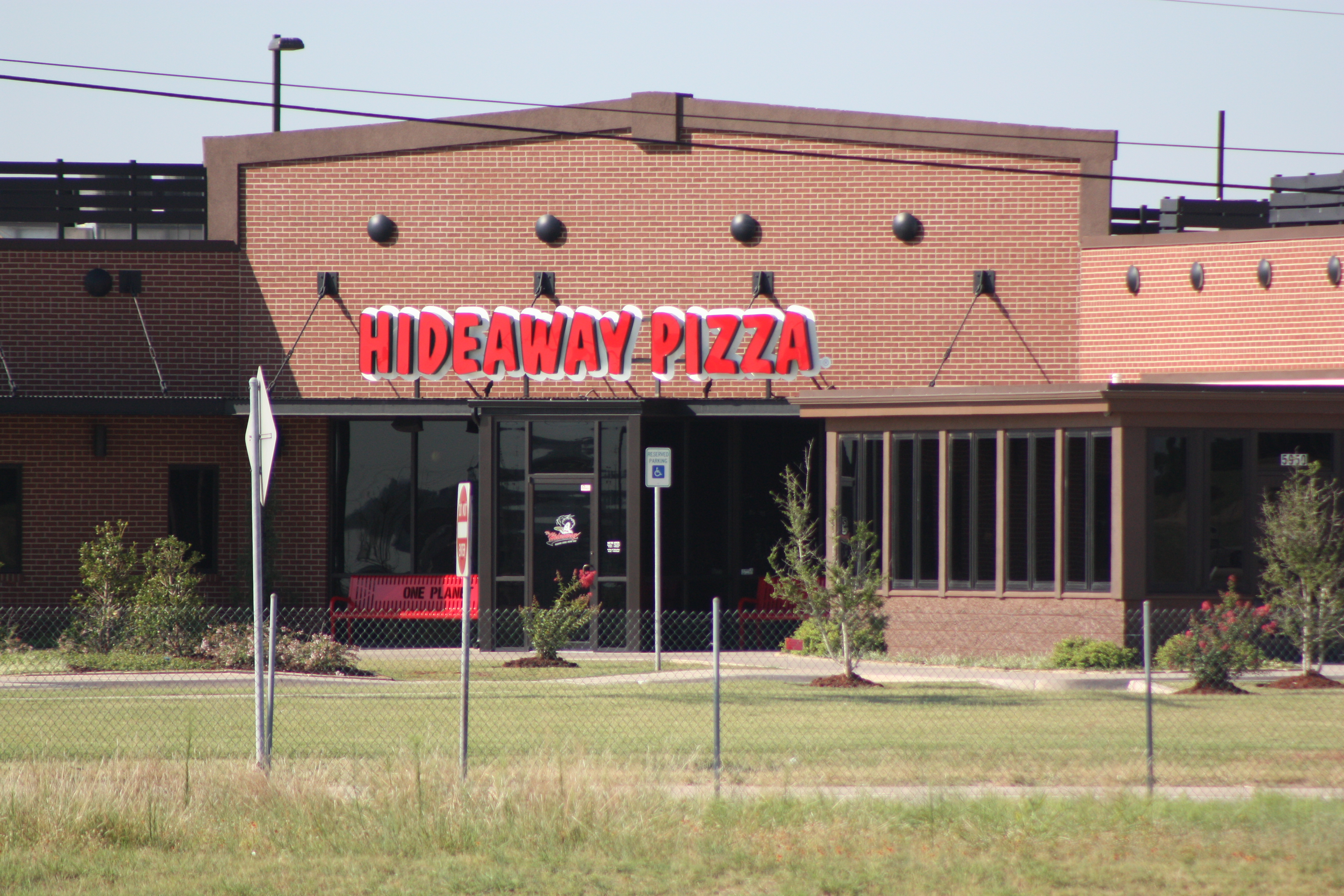
Store in Oklahoma City

Hideaway Pizza is a restaurant originally opened in 1957 in Stillwater, Oklahoma. Its original location is in Stillwater at the corner of 3rd St and Knoblock, near the Oklahoma State University campus.

In 1993, the restaurant started opening locations outside of Stillwater. As of August 2024, there are nine locations in the Oklahoma City area, six locations in the Tulsa area, one location in Bartlesville, Oklahoma, one location in Enid, Oklahoma and four locations in Arkansas, and two in the Dallas area with four more locations opening in 2027.

Hideaway Pizza sells pizza, salads, pastas, and sandwiches.

Hideaway Pizza is famous for its giant kites filling the ceilings, its tie-dye themed restaurants, and the large scale collage artwork created by the Oklahoma City artist, Jessica Petrus.

== VW Bug Delivery ==
During the 1960s and 1970s and through the 1980s, Hideaway was known for having delivered pizzas to consumers in Stillwater using a fleet of brightly colored Volkswagen Beetles with racing stripes. In the late 1990s, when Volkswagen re-released the Beetle, Hideaway received the first one sold in Oklahoma.
