= Len Velander =

American football coach and mechanical engineer

Biographical details
- Born: August 24, 1920; Laxå, Sweden
- Died: March 13, 2014 (aged 93)
- Education: Wisconsin (BA); Minnesota (MS)

Coaching career (HC unless noted)
- 1945: Augsburg

Head coaching record
- Overall: 0–3

Gusta Rune Lennart Velander (August 24, 1920 – March 13, 2014) was an American football coach and mechanical engineer. He served as the co-head football coach with Luther Gronseth at Augsburg College in Minneapolis, Minnesota in 1945, compiling 0–3. Velander died on March 13, 2014.
