= Antonio Hidalgo (defender, born 1943) =

Spanish footballer

Personal information
- Full name: Antonio Hidalgo Rodríguez
- Date of birth: 15 February 1943
- Place of birth: Seville, Spain
- Date of death: 6 March 2014 (aged 71)
- Height: 1.65 m (5 ft 5 in)
- Position: Defender

Senior career*
Years	Team	Apps	(Gls)
1967–1968	Badajoz	28	(1)
1968–1976	Celta de Vigo	170	(1)
Total		198	(2)
- * Club domestic league appearances and goals

Antonio Hidalgo Rodríguez (15 February 1943 – 6 March 2014) was a Spanish professional footballer who played as a defender.

== Career ==
Born in Seville, Hidalgo played for Badajoz and Celta de Vigo.
