= Gwen Matthewman =

English knitter

Gwen Matthewman (1927 — 6 March 2014 (aged 86)) born in Streethouse, later of Featherstone, was an English Guinness World Record holder in knitting between 1980 and 2005. In 1968 her knitting technique was analysed by Japanese professors in Tokyo.

Before Apollo 11's departure for the moon Matthewman knitted a sweater for Neil Armstrong, and received a letter of receipt from Robert R. Gilruth, the director of NASA's Manned Spacecraft Center. The sweater is held at the Ohio History Center. A copy of this sweater was worn by Danny Lloyd in the role of Danny Torrance in Stanley Kubrick's The Shining. Matthewman knitted a sweater for boxer Richard Dunn prior to his The Ring, World Boxing Council (WBC) and World Boxing Association (WBA) World Heavyweight title defeat by Muhammad Ali at Olympiahalle, Munich, West Germany on Monday 24 May 1976.

== Guinness World record ==
Matthewman set the world record with a speed of 111 stitches per minute in a test at Phildar's Wool Shop in Central Street, Leeds on Monday 29 September 1980. Gwen Matthewman's world record was broken in 2005 by Miriam Tegals of the Netherlands who stitched 118 stitches in one minute. There is currently a dispute between the Matthewman family and Guinness about the format in which Tegals's record was obtained. World knitting records are recorded over three minutes and not the one minute that Tegals recorded. Matthewman knitted 333 stitches in three minutes with an average of 111 stitches per minute, and the closest to date is 268 stitches in three minutes, which is 65 stitches short of Matthewman's record.

== Television appearances ==
She also appeared on Blue Peter, with Roy Castle, Norris McWhirter, and Ross McWhirter on Record Breakers in 1973, with David Frost on Breakfast with Frost, and Game for a Laugh. Gwen appeared with David Letterman on Late Night with David Letterman alongside; Dana Delany, Lonnie Mack, and Sam Kinison, on Friday 13 April 1990.
