= F. Edward Osborne =

American politician

F. Edward Osborne (1925 - March 3, 2014) was an American politician and businessman.

== Biography ==
Born in Oil City, Pennsylvania, Osborne served in the United States Navy during World War II. He then graduated from the Wharton School of Business and was a financial officer for Ore-Ida Foods and H.J. Heinz. In 1968, he moved to Boise, Idaho and was an executive for Ore-Ida retiring in 1988. He served in the Idaho House of Representatives in 1989 and then in the Idaho State Senate in 1991 and 1992. Osborne died in Boise, Idaho.
