= Deaths in January 2014 =

The following is a list of notable deaths in January 2014.

Entries for each day are listed alphabetically by surname. A typical entry lists information in the following sequence:

- Name, age, country of citizenship and reason for notability, established cause of death, reference.

== January 2014 ==
=== 1 ===
- Peter Austin, 92, British brewer (Ringwood Brewery).
- Bobbi Jean Baker, 49, American transgender activist and minister, traffic collision.
- John Hanson Briscoe, 79, American politician.
- George Deas Brown, 91, Australian politician.
- Traian T. Coșovei, 59, Romanian poet.
- Pierre Cullaz, 78, French jazz guitarist and cellist.
- Herman Pieter de Boer, 85, Dutch writer, lyricist and journalist.
- Pete DeCoursey, 52, American political journalist, pancreatic and lung cancer.
- Michael Glennon, 69, Australian Roman Catholic priest and convicted child molester.
- James H. Harless, 94, American industrialist and philanthropist.
- Higashifushimi Kunihide, 103, Japanese Buddhist monk.
- Milan Horvat, 94, Croatian conductor.
- Jamal al-Jamal, 56, Palestinian diplomat, Ambassador to the Czech Republic (since 2013), injuries sustained in an explosion.
- Jorge Jottar, 84, Chilean Olympic skeet shooter, heart attack.
- Ron Jourdan, 66, American Olympic high jumper.
- Billy McColl, 62, Scottish actor (Doctor Who).
- William Mgimwa, 63, Tanzanian politician, MP (since 2010), Minister of Finance (since 2012).
- Therese Mills, 85, Trinidad journalist and editor.
- Juanita Moore, 99, American actress (Imitation of Life, Disney's The Kid, Two Moon Junction).
- Jafar Namdar, 79, Iranian Olympic and World Cup football referee.
- Dean Nyquist, 78, American politician and lawyer.
- Ruth Schnapp, 87, American structural engineer and activist.
- Josep Seguer, 90, Spanish footballer.
- Cal Swenson, 65, Canadian ice hockey player (Winnipeg Jets).
- Tabby Thomas, 84, American blues musician.
- Sam Ulano, 93, American drummer.
- Elaine Usher, 81, English actress (The Firm of Girdlestone).
- Tokuo Yamashita, 94, Japanese politician, Minister of Health, Labour, and Welfare.

=== 2 ===
- Terry Biddlecombe, 72, English National Hunt jockey.
- Jeanne Brabants, 93, Belgian dancer, choreographer and teacher.
- Terry Magaoa Chapman, 69, Niuean civil servant.
- Des Dans, 89, Australian trade unionist and politician.
- Countess Anne Dorte of Rosenborg, 66, Danish countess, respiratory illness.
- Louis George, 63, Saint Lucian politician, Minister of Education (1982–1997).
- Bernard Glasser, 89, American film producer (Return of the Fly, The Day of the Triffids).
- Tibor Gonczol, 80, Australian Olympic sport shooter.
- Patrick Heron, 61, Irish author, cancer.
- Elizabeth Jane Howard, 90, English novelist.
- R. Crosby Kemper Jr., 86, American banker and civic philanthropist.
- Thomas Kurzhals, 60, German composer and musician (Stern-Combo Meißen, Karat), liver cirrhosis.
- Li Tai-hsiang, 72, Taiwanese composer and folk songwriter, multiple organ failure.
- Ian Mackley, 71, British diplomat, High Commissioner to Ghana (1996–2000).
- Dhananjay Mahato, 94, Indian politician.
- Franciszek Malinowski, 82, Polish scholar and journalist.
- Michael J. Matthews, 79, American politician and convicted criminal, Mayor of Atlantic City, New Jersey (1982–1984).
- Yōko Mitsui, 78, Japanese poet, liver failure.
- Minoru Muraoka, 90, Japanese musician, multiple organ failure.
- Hal Newton, 80, Canadian football player (Calgary Stampeders).
- Harald Nugiseks, 92, Estonian war veteran and anti-communism activist.
- Oiteyama Hirokuni, 75, Japanese sumo wrestler.
- Dirk Sager, 73, German journalist.
- Arnold A. Saltzman, 97, American businessman and diplomat.
- Viktor Talyanov, 79, Soviet Olympic skier.
- Jay Traynor, 70, American singer (Jay and the Americans), liver cancer.

=== 3 ===
- Larry Arndt, 50, American baseball player (Oakland Athletics).
- Guillermo Arriaga Fernández, 87, Mexican dancer, composer and choreographer, pneumonia.
- Eric Barnes, 76, English footballer (Crewe Alexandra).
- Sylvia Bassot, 73, French politician, member of the National Assembly (1996–2012).
- Albert Calland, 84, English footballer.
- Robert E. Lee Chadwick, 83, American anthropologist and archaeologist.
- Carlos Manuel de Céspedes y García-Menocal, 77, Cuban theologian and writer.
- Leon de Wolff, 65, Dutch journalist and media consultant, multiple system atrophy.
- Robert Diligent, 89, French journalist.
- Phil Everly, 74, American Hall of Fame singer and musician (The Everly Brothers), chronic obstructive pulmonary disease.
- Donald Forst, 81, American newspaper editor, cancer.
- John M. Freeman, 80, American pediatric neurologist.
- George Goodman, 83, American economics commentator, myelofibrosis.
- László Helyey, 65, Hungarian actor.
- Sir Michael Neubert, 80, British politician, MP for Romford (1974–1997).
- Salvador Lo Presti, 91, Argentine Olympic weightlifter (1948).
- Alicia Rhett, 98, American actress (Gone with the Wind) and portrait painter.
- Jennie Robak, 81, American politician, Nebraska State Senator (1989–2003), traffic collision.
- Wilson Allen Shoffner, 75, American soldier.
- Božidar Stanišić, 77, Montenegrin Olympic water polo player.
- George Wilson, 93, Australian rules footballer.
- Larry Vognild, 81, American politician, Washington State Senator (1978–1994), heart failure.
- Yashiki Takajin, 64, Japanese singer-songwriter and television presenter, esophageal cancer.
- Saul Zaentz, 92, American film producer (One Flew over the Cuckoo's Nest, The English Patient, Amadeus), Oscar winner (1976, 1985, 1997), Alzheimer's disease.

=== 4 ===
- Bill Abington, 92, American politician, member of the Texas House of Representatives (1949–1953).
- Ahmad A'zam, 64, Uzbek writer.
- Caixa Eletronica, 9, American racehorse, training collision.
- Mrinal Das, 66, Indian trade unionist, heart attack.
- Irving Fishman, 92, American politician, member of the Massachusetts House of Representatives (1963–1968), Senator (1971–1974).
- Gabe Gabler, 83, American baseball player (Chicago Cubs).
- Andy Holden, 65, English Olympic long-distance runner (1972).
- Shirley Jeffrey, 74, Australian marine biologist.
- Chris Karras, 89, American painter.
- Sergey Kozlov, 53, Russian football player and coach.
- Jean Metellus, 76, Haitian poet and writer.
- Josef Staribacher, 92, Austrian politician, pneumonia.

=== 5 ===
- Martin Behrmann, 83, German choirmaster and university teacher.
- M'hamed Benguettaf, 75, Algerian actor and playwright.
- Philippe Boiry, 86, French pretender to the throne of the Kingdom of Araucania and Patagonia.
- Jerry Coleman, 89, American baseball player (New York Rangers), manager (San Diego Padres), and broadcaster, complications from brain bleeding and surgery.
- Richard Comito, 74, American politician.
- Philip Downs, 85, British-born Canadian musicologist.
- C. Durairaj, Indian politician.
- Eusébio, 71, Portuguese footballer, top goalscorer at the 1966 World Cup, heart failure.
- Arthur Gietzelt, 93, Australian politician, Senator for New South Wales (1971–1989), Minister for Veterans' Affairs (1983–1987).
- Augusto Graziani, 80, Italian economist.
- Slamet Gundono, 47, Indonesian puppeteer.
- Brian Hart, 77, British racing driver and engineer.
- Simon Hoggart, 67, English journalist, pancreatic cancer.
- Govert Huijser, 82, Dutch general, Chief of the Defence Staff (1983–1988).
- Annamária Kinde, 57, Romanian poet, journalist and editor.
- Uday Kiran, 33, Indian film actor, suicide by hanging.
- Agnes Kripps, 88, Canadian politician.
- János Kristófi, 88, Romanian painter.
- E. J. Lowe, 63, British philosopher.
- Alma Muriel, 62, Mexican actress, heart attack.
- Nelson Ned, 66, Brazilian singer, pneumonia.
- Thomas R. Olsen, 79, American major general.
- Mogens E. Pedersen, 85, Danish journalist (Se og Hør).
- Tom Quinn, 79, American actor (The Wire, Super 8, The Next Three Days), diabetes.
- Peter Rull Sr., 91, Hong Kong Olympic sport shooter.
- Rod Searle, 93, American politician, member of the Minnesota House of Representatives (1957–1981), Speaker (1979).
- Sissel Sellæg, 85, Norwegian actress.
- Endre Senkálszky, 99, Romanian actor and director.
- C. Donald Stritch, 82, American politician.
- Joseph Talbott, 80, American politician, member of the West Virginia House of Delegates.
- K. P. Udayabhanu, 77, Indian playback singer.
- David Maxwell Walker, 93, Scottish lawyer and academic.
- Ray Williams, 86, Welsh rugby union player.
- Carmen Zapata, 86, American actress (Sister Act, Santa Barbara, Viva Valdez), heart disease.
- Mustapha Zitouni, 85, French-Algerian footballer.

=== 6 ===
- Jim Appleby, 79, English footballer (Blackburn Rovers).
- John Ash, 88, English ornithologist.
- Bob Bolen, 87, American politician and businessman, Mayor of Fort Worth, Texas (1982–1991).
- Don Chuy, 72, American football player (Los Angeles Rams, Philadelphia Eagles).
- Gary Freeman, 76, American sculptor.
- Rashaad Galant, 66, South African cricketer.
- Marina Ginestà, 94, French veteran of the Spanish Civil War.
- Karel Gut, 86, Czech ice hockey player and manager, member of the International Ice Hockey Federation Hall of Fame.
- Aitzaz Hasan, 17, Pakistani schoolboy, intercepted suicide bomber at school, injuries sustained in bombing.
- Frank Illiano, 86, American criminal (Genovese crime family), infection.
- Larry D. Mann, 91, Canadian-born American actor (Gunsmoke, Hill Street Blues, Rudolph the Red-Nosed Reindeer).
- Pedro Mayorga, 93, Argentine Olympic equestrian and sports official.
- Thomas Patrick Melady, 86, American educator and diplomat, Ambassador to Burundi (1969–1972), Uganda (1972–1973) and the Holy See (1989–1993).
- Čika Mišo, 82, Bosnian shoeshiner, heart attack.
- James Moorhouse, 90, British politician, Member of the European Parliament (1979–1999).
- Hector Munro, 93, English cricketer.
- Carlos Padilla, 79, Honduran football manager.
- H. Owen Reed, 103, American composer, conductor and educator.
- Bishop Robinson, 86, American police chief, Commissioner of the Baltimore Police Department (1984–1987), Alzheimer's disease.
- Julian Rotter, 97, American psychologist.
- Lena Smedsaas, 62, Swedish journalist (TV4Nyheterna), cancer.
- Mónica Spear, 29, Venezuelan actress and beauty pageant winner (Miss Venezuela 2004), shot.
- Don Ward, 78, Canadian ice hockey player (Chicago Black Hawks, Boston Bruins).
- Todd Williams, 35, American football player (Tennessee Titans).

=== 7 ===
- AKM Nazir Ahmed, 74, Bangladeshi politician.
- Jerald C. Anderson, 79, American politician, Minnesota State Senator (1970–1980).
- Alvin Aubert, 83, American poet.
- Paul Cuneo, 75, Australian rugby league footballer.
- Giuseppe Frascarelli, 90, Italian footballer (Ascoli).
- Ivan Ladislav Galeta, 66, Croatian multimedia artist.
- Paul Goggins, 60, British politician, MP for Wythenshawe and Sale East (since 1997), brain haemorrhage.
- Maureen Gray, 65, American songwriter and doo-wop singer, bile duct cancer.
- Bakhtiyar Gulamov, 64, Azerbaijani footballer.
- Thomas V. Jones, 93, American businessman, CEO of Northrop Corporation (1960–1989), pulmonary fibrosis.
- Thomas Knight, 62, American convicted murderer and fugitive, execution by lethal injection.
- Willy Köstinger, 73, Austrian Olympic skier (1964).
- Peter Moraites, 91, American politician.
- Vilard Normcharoen, 51, Thai footballer (Thai Port).
- Emiel Pauwels, 95, Belgian athlete.
- Phil Ryan, 98, Australian football player and administrator (Hawthorn).
- Madeleine Sharp, 93, British physician and peace campaigner.
- Sir Run Run Shaw, 106, Hong Kong media mogul (Shaw Brothers Studio) and philanthropist.
- Sunshine Forever, 29, American racehorse.
- Sir Richard Thornton, 81, British landowner and public servant. Lord Lieutenant of Surrey (1986–1997).
- Roy Warhurst, 87, English footballer (Birmingham City).
- Edgar White, 84, American Olympic sailor.

=== 8 ===
- Antora, 40, Bangladeshi actress.
- Robert Ascher, 82, American archaeologist and anthropologist.
- Vicente T. Blaz, 85, American USMC general and politician, delegate to the U.S. House of Representatives from Guam (1985–1993).
- Vishwanath Bondre, 77, Indian cricketer.
- Luis Marcos Bronstein, 67, Argentine chess player.
- Charles Casali, 90, Swiss footballer (BSC Young Boys).
- Joy Chatel, 66, American cosmetologist, community organizer and activist, respiratory disease.
- Angela Clayton, 54–55, British physicist.
- Ernie Derr, 92, American stock car racing driver.
- Maciej Dunal, 60, Polish actor and singer.
- André Gernez, 90, French physician.
- Madeline Gins, 72, American poet, painter and architect, cancer.
- Irma Heijting-Schuhmacher, 88, Dutch Olympic swimmer (1948, 1952).
- Adrian Holmes, 88, Australian Olympic boxer.
- Levon Khechoyan, 58, Armenian writer.
- Josef Lammerz, 83, German composer and organist.
- Jacques Lazarus, 97, Swiss-born French military officer, Jewish resistance leader in France during World War II.
- José Luis Martinez, 87, Spanish Olympic sports shooter.
- Armen Mazmanyan, 53, Armenian theater director and actor.
- Edward N. Ney, 88, American business executive and diplomat, CEO of Young & Rubicam (1970–1986), Ambassador to Canada (1989–1992).
- Robert Pastor, 66, American academic and national security advisor, colon cancer.
- Antonino Roman, 74, Filipino politician, member of the House of Representatives (1998–2007), multiple organ failure.
- Selçuk Uluergüven, 73, Turkish actor.

=== 9 ===
- Amiri Baraka, 79, American poet, writer and activist, Poet Laureate of New Jersey (2002–2003).
- Charlie Bazzano, 90, Australian Olympic cyclist.
- Rynn Berry, 68, American vegetarian activist and author, heart attack.
- Richard Brett, 74, British theatre consultant.
- Roy Campbell Jr., 61, American jazz trumpeter, hypertensive atherosclerotic cardiovascular disease.
- Cliff Carpenter, 98, American actor (Synecdoche, New York, Alan Wake, The Daily Show).
- Josep Maria Castellet, 87, Spanish writer, publisher and editor.
- Bill Conlin, 79, American sports columnist (Philadelphia Daily News).
- Lorella De Luca, 73, Italian actress, brain tumour.
- Paul du Toit, 48, South African artist, cancer.
- Faith Evans, 76, American state legislator.
- Luis García, 84, Venezuelan professional baseball player, cerebrovascular disease.
- Yuri Golov, 77, Russian footballer.
- Patrick J. Hannifin, 90, American naval officer.
- Winfried Hassemer, 73, German judge and academic.
- Michael Hemmingson, 47, American writer, cardiac arrest.
- Aslam Khan, 50, Pakistani police chief, bombing.
- Salvador Llopis, 63, Spanish footballer.
- Hans Lund-Andersen, 92, Norwegian mining engineer and businessperson.
- Franklin McCain, 73, American civil rights leader, member of the Greensboro Four.
- Albert McCann, 72, English footballer (Portsmouth).
- D. Harold McNamara, 90, American astronomer.
- Jean-Jacques Moreau, 90, French mathematician.
- Dale T. Mortensen, 74, American economist, laureate of the Nobel Prize in Economic Sciences (2010), cancer.
- Eric Palante, 50, Belgian motorcycle rally rider, race collision.
- Věra Tichánková, 93, Czech actress.
- Bill Woodhouse, 77, American sprinter.
- Marc Yor, 64, French mathematician.

=== 10 ===
- Bernie Anderson, 71, American politician.
- Joel Barkan, 72, American political scientist, pulmonary embolism.
- Riad Barmada, 84, Syrian-American orthopedic surgeon.
- Chris Bennett, 60, British-born American Egyptologist, ampullary cancer.
- Sam Berns, 17, American high school student, progeria sufferer and documentary subject (Life According to Sam), progeria.
- Ike Borsavage, 89, American basketball player.
- Elliot Eisner, 80, American academic.
- Kathryn Findlay, 60, British architect, brain tumour.
- Sally Fox, 62, American politician.
- Aram Gharabekian, 58, Armenian conductor.
- Taissa S. Hauser, 71, American sociologist, cancer.
- Anthony J. Hederman, 92, Irish judge, Attorney General (1977–1981).
- Petr Hlaváček, 63, Czech academic and shoe expert.
- Frouwke Laning-Boersema, 76, Dutch politician, member of the House of Representatives (1982–1994).
- Margo Maeckelberghe, 81, British artist.
- Marly Marley, 75, Brazilian vedette and actress, pancreatic cancer.
- Jean-Claude Roger Mbede, 34, Cameroonian prisoner, imprisoned for homosexuality.
- Zbigniew Messner, 84, Polish politician, Prime Minister of the People's Republic of Poland (1985–1988).
- Donald Morton, 79, American oncologist, heart failure.
- Salvatore Nicolosi, 91, Italian Roman Catholic prelate, Bishop of Lipari (1963–1970) and Noto (1970–1998).
- Ian Redford, 53, Scottish footballer (Rangers, Ipswich Town, Dundee).
- Larry Speakes, 74, American journalist, de facto White House Press Secretary (1981–1987), Alzheimer's disease.
- Hadi Thayeb, 91, Indonesian diplomat, co-founder of the Ministry of Foreign Affairs, Minister of Industry (1964–1966), Governor of Aceh (1981–1986).
- Jack Tuell, 90, American Methodist minister and equal-rights advocate, Bishop of Los Angeles (1980–1992).
- Allard van der Scheer, 85, Dutch actor.
- Evangelos Vlasis, 69, Greek Olympic triple jumper.

=== 11 ===
- Zainul Abedin, 69, Bangladeshi politician.
- Georgia Allen, 94, American actress.
- Keiko Awaji, 80, Japanese actress (Stray Dog, The Bridges at Toko-Ri), esophageal cancer.
- Jean Biès, 80–81, French philosopher and author.
- Jophery Brown, 68, American baseball player (Chicago Cubs) and stuntman (Die Hard, Predator), complications from cancer.
- Chai Trong-rong, 78, Taiwanese politician, stroke.
- Walter Currie, 91, Canadian educator.
- Zoltán Pál Dienes, 97, Hungarian mathematician and educationalist.
- Bryan Fairfax, 88, Australian conductor.
- Arnoldo Foà, 97, Italian actor, voice actor and director, respiratory failure.
- Niles Fulwyler, 85, American major general.
- Vugar Gashimov, 27, Azerbaijani chess player, complications from a brain tumour.
- Muhammad Habibur Rahman, 85, Bangladeshi judge and jurist, Chief Justice (1995), Chief Advisor (1996).
- Cham Hendon, 78, American painter.
- Michael Jacobs, 61, British writer, cancer.
- Joe Junkin, 67, Canadian ice hockey player (Boston Bruins), cancer.
- Dick Miller, 55, American basketball player (Utah Jazz), heart attack.
- Stephen Patrick, 81, Canadian football player (Winnipeg Blue Bombers) and politician.
- Volodymyr Raskatov, 56, Ukrainian Soviet Olympic silver and bronze medallist swimmer (1976).
- Ariel Sharon, 85, Israeli politician and general, Minister of Defense (1981–1983), Prime Minister (2001–2006), heart failure.
- Sitaram Singh, 65, Indian politician.
- Alphonsus Augustus Sowada, 80, American Roman Catholic prelate, Bishop of Agats (1969–2001).
- Bertram Türpe, 61, German Olympic swimmer.
- Stanley Uys, 91, South African journalist, heart attack.
- Jerome Willis, 85, British actor (Doctor Who, Space Precinct).
- Mora Windt-Martini, 76, Romanian world champion field handball team player (1956).

=== 12 ===
- Neal Barrett Jr., 84, American author.
- Alexandra Bastedo, 67, British actress (Casino Royale, The Champions, Batman Begins) and animal welfare advocate, breast cancer.
- Nick Bevan, 71, British rowing coach.
- Connie Binsfeld, 89, American politician, Lieutenant Governor of Michigan (1991–1999).
- John Button, 70, British racing driver, suspected heart attack.
- Halet Çambel, 97, Turkish Olympic fencer (1936) and archaeologist.
- George Dement, 91, American innkeeper, restaurateur and politician, Mayor of Bossier City, Louisiana (1989–2005).
- François Deniau, 77, French Roman Catholic prelate, Bishop of Nevers (1998–2011).
- Keith Dyce, 87, British veterinarian.
- William Feindel, 95, Canadian neurosurgeon.
- Tony Harding, 72, British comics artist.
- Ángel Herrero, 71, Spanish footballer, pulmonary edema.
- Patrick Horsbrugh, 93, British architecture professor.
- John Horsley, 93, British actor (The Fall and Rise of Reginald Perrin, The Box of Delights, You Rang, M'Lord?).
- Dominic A. Infante, 73, American communication scholar.
- Burton Lifland, 84, American judge, pneumonia.
- Frank Marth, 91, American actor (The Honeymooners, Hogan's Heroes), heart failure and Alzheimer's disease.
- Ray Myland, 86, British Olympic wrestler.
- Robert H. Quinn, 85, American attorney and politician, Speaker of the Massachusetts House of Representatives (1967–1969), President of the NAAG (1974–1975).
- Armando Rodriguez, 96, Cuban-born American grocer.
- Sir Robert Scholey, 92, British business executive, Chairman of British Steel (1986–1992).
- Zdenko Škrabalo, 84, Serbian-born Croatian academician and diplomat, Minister of Foreign and European Affairs (1992–1993).
- Michael L. Strang, 84, American politician, member of the U.S. House of Representatives from Colorado (1985–1987).
- Tsunetoshi Tanaka, 88, Japanese politician, member of the House of Representatives (1969–1972, 1980–1996).
- Gyula Török, 75, Hungarian Olympic champion boxer (1960).

=== 13 ===
- Don Asmonga, 85, American basketball player and teacher.
- Manibhushan Bhattacharya, 75, Indian poet.
- Patricia Boyle, 76, American federal judge, U.S. District Court Justice (1978–1983), Michigan Supreme Court Justice (1983–1998), respiratory failure.
- Ulysse Bozonnet, 92, French soldier and Olympic skier (1948).
- Bobby Collins, 82, Scottish footballer.
- José Daher, 47, Brazilian tennis player, road accident.
- Anjali Devi, 86, Indian actress (Lava Kusa, Suvarna Sundari) and film producer.
- Mihai Fotino, 83, Romanian actor (Codine).
- Gatluak Deng Garang, 59, South Sudanese general and politician, Governor of Upper Nile (2008–2009), cancer.
- Gary Grimshaw, 67, American rock concert graphic poster artist.
- Amos Hadar, 90, Israeli politician.
- Kees IJmkers, 89, Dutch politician, member of the Senate (1966–1967, 1969–1987).
- Bruce Jones, 68, American surfboard shaper, heart attack.
- Ronny Jordan, 51, English jazz guitarist.
- Henri Jova, 94, American architect.
- Eric Khoo Heng-Pheng, 57, Malaysian scout leader, heart attack.
- Bennie Lands, 92, Canadian Olympic basketball player (1948).
- Freddie "Fingers" Lee, 76, British singer.
- Thomas McCloy, 86, Irish cricketer.
- Norm Parker, 72, American college football coach, defensive coordinator of the Iowa Hawkeyes (1999–2011).
- Randal Tye Thomas, 35, American politician, Mayor of Gun Barrel City, Texas (2000–2001).
- Michael Tshele, 64, South African photographer and community activist, shot.
- Menachem Zilberman, 67, Israeli comedian and songwriter, heart attack.

=== 14 ===
- Rex Adams, 85, English footballer (Blackpool, Oldham Athletic).
- Marian Ewurama Addy, 72, Ghanaian scientist.
- Cosimo Antonelli, 87, Italian Olympic water polo player (1956).
- Joan Beck, 95, Australian archaeologist and fencer.
- Issa Benyamin, 89, Iranian Assyrian calligrapher and educator.
- Jon Bing, 69, Norwegian writer and legal scholar.
- Alan Blackburn, 78, English footballer (West Ham United, Halifax Town, Margate).
- Erik Blegvad, 90, British illustrator.
- Pierre F. Brault, 74, Canadian composer.
- Fernand Brosius, 79, Luxembourgish footballer (Spora Luxembourg).
- Sir Nicholas Browne, 66, British diplomat, Ambassador to Iran (1999–2002) and Denmark (2003–2006).
- Jonathan Dean, 89, American diplomat.
- Juan Gelman, 83, Argentine poet, winner of the Miguel de Cervantes Prize (2007), myelodysplastic syndrome.
- Jerry Marciniak, 76, Canadian football player.
- Eric James Mellon, 88, English ceramic artist.
- Ole Moe, 95, Norwegian newspaper editor and politician.
- Eric Paterson, 84, Canadian Olympic champion ice hockey player (1952).
- Bernard Perlin, 95, American painter.
- Esther Ann Reeser, 86, American baseball player (Springfield Sallies).
- Richard Shepherd, 86, American film producer (Breakfast at Tiffany's, The Hunger, The Hanging Tree), kidney failure.
- St Nicholas Abbey, 6, Irish racehorse, euthanised due to complications from colic surgery.
- Flavio Testi, 91, Italian composer and musicologist.
- Michalis Vardanis, 78, Greek Army officer and lawyer, major figure in the resistance against the military junta.
- Mae Young, 90, American Hall of Fame professional wrestler (WWF).

=== 15 ===
- Mallikarjun Bande, 39, Indian police officer, shot.
- Curtis Bray, 43, American football player and coach (Pittsburgh Panthers), pulmonary embolism.
- Joan Brickhill, 89, South African actress and producer.
- A. Lorne Campbell, 83, Canadian lawyer.
- George Chalhoub, 82, Egyptian Olympic basketball player.
- Namdeo Dhasal, 64, Indian poet and activist, colon cancer.
- Quail Dobbs, 72, American equestrian and clown.
- John Dobson, 98, American astronomer.
- Don Engel, 84, American lawyer, leukemia.
- Marion Faller, 72, American photographer.
- Joyce Fenton, 86, New Zealand fencer.
- José de Jesús García Ayala, 103, Mexican Roman Catholic prelate, Bishop of Campeche (1967–1982).
- Elena Gorokhova, 80, Russian painter.
- Fred Hargadon, 80, American academic administrator.
- Liam Hogan, 74, Irish hurler.
- Cassandra Lynn, 34, American model, suspected drug overdose.
- Gennadi Matveyev, 76, Russian football player and manager.
- Tor Milde, 61, Norwegian journalist and writer (Verdens Gang).
- Connie O'Connor, 90, American basketball player (Detroit Gems).
- Reid Patterson, 81, American Olympic swimmer (1956), Georgia Sports Hall of Fame inductee (1984).
- Maya Romanoff, 72, American interior designer.
- Stanford Tischler, 92, American film editor and producer (M*A*S*H).
- Hiroshi Yoshino, 87, Japanese poet, pneumonia.

=== 16 ===
- Suleyman Aliyarli, 83, Azerbaijani historian.
- Gary Arlington, 75, American author, editor and publisher, key figure in the underground comix movement.
- Harvey Bernhard, 89, American film producer (The Goonies, The Omen, The Lost Boys).
- Patrick Chabal, 63, British political scientist.
- John G. Cleary, 64, New Zealand computer scientist.
- Douglas Davis, 80, American art critic and artist.
- Ruth Duccini, 95, American actress (The Wizard of Oz).
- Karl Hudson-Phillips, 80, Trinidadian judge and politician, Attorney General (1969–1973).
- Tom Jelley, 87, American football player (Pittsburgh Steelers).
- Russell Johnson, 89, American actor (Gilligan's Island, The Twilight Zone, The Greatest Story Ever Told), kidney failure.
- W. Hudson Kensel, 85, American historian and author.
- Vladimír Krajňák, 86, Slovak Olympic skier.
- Roger Lloyd-Pack, 69, English actor (Only Fools and Horses, The Vicar of Dibley, Tinker, Tailor, Soldier, Spy), pancreatic cancer.
- Dave Madden, 82, Canadian-born American actor (Laugh In, The Partridge Family, Alice), heart and kidney failure.
- Hiroo Onoda, 91, Japanese Imperial Army World War II intelligence officer, did not surrender until 1974.
- Bence Rakaczki, 20, Hungarian footballer, leukemia.
- José Sulaimán, 82, Mexican boxing official, President of the World Boxing Council (since 1975), International Boxing Hall of Fame inductee (2007).
- Hal Sutherland, 84, American animator (Sleeping Beauty, Star Trek: The Animated Series), co-founder of Filmation.
- Chris Ullo, 85, American politician, member of the Louisiana House of Representatives (1972–1988) and Senate (1988–2008), heart failure.
- Stan Watson, 76, British footballer (Darlington).

=== 17 ===
- Martin Barratt, 77, British paediatrician.
- Salvador Breglia, 78, Paraguayan football player and coach.
- Mohammed Burhanuddin, 98, Indian Islamic spiritual leader, 52nd Da'i al-Mutlaq of the Dawoodi Bohras, heart attack.
- Frank Cockett, 97, British surgeon and art historian.
- Niels Lauritz Dahl, 87, Norwegian diplomat.
- Norman Durkee, 65, American composer and pianist.
- Joe Evans, 97, American jazz alto saxophonist.
- Holger Hansson, 86, Swedish Olympic bronze-medalist football player (1952) and coach.
- Thomas Hogan, 58, Canadian Ojibwe painter.
- Seizō Katō, 86, Japanese voice actor, bladder cancer.
- Saizo Kishimoto, 85, Japanese yakuza (Yamaguchi-gumi).
- Francine Lalonde, 73, Canadian politician, MP for Mercier (1993–2004) and La Pointe-de-l'Île (2004–2011), cancer.
- Kong Le, 79, Laotian military leader.
- James Lockhart, 80, American historian.
- Julia Cooper Mack, 93, American judge.
- Gustavo Magariños, 91, Uruguayan Olympic basketball player.
- Alistair McAlpine, Baron McAlpine of West Green, 71, British businessman, politician and author, Treasurer of the Conservative Party (1975–1990).
- John J. McGinty III, 73, American Marine Corps officer, recipient of the Medal of Honor.
- Nadia Haro Oliva, 97, Mexican actress and Olympic fencer (1948).
- Alexandros Petersen, 29, American academic, writer and geopolitical energy specialist, bombing.
- Sunanda Pushkar, 51, Indian-born Canadian businesswoman and entrepreneur, drug overdose.
- Suchitra Sen, 82, Indian actress (Sharey Chuattor, Harano Sur, Deep Jwele Jaai), heart attack.

=== 18 ===
- Kathryn Abbe, 94, American photographer.
- Robert A. Alberty, 92, American biophysical chemist.
- Tommaso Bisagno, 78, Italian politician, member of the Chamber of Deputies (1979–1994).
- W. Robert Blair, 83, American lawyer, businessman and politician, member of the Illinois House of Representatives (1967–1977).
- Michael Botmang, 76, Nigerian politician, Governor of Plateau State (2006–2007), kidney disease.
- Peadar Clohessy, 80, Irish politician, TD for Limerick East (1981–1982, 1987–1997).
- John Joseph Compton, 85, American philosopher.
- Herbert Dodkins, 84, English Olympic footballer (1956).
- Komla Dumor, 41, Ghanaian journalist and news presenter (BBC World News, Focus on Africa), heart attack.
- Obi Egbuna, 82, Nigerian novelist, playwright and political activist.
- Jacques Famery, 90, French film actor.
- Dennis Frederiksen, 62, American rock singer (Angel, Le Roux, Toto), liver cancer.
- Andy Graver, 86, English footballer (Lincoln City).
- Takao Iwami, 78, Japanese political pundit, pneumonia.
- Trevor Jacobs, 67, English footballer.
- Milan Kajkl, 63, Czech Olympic silver-medalist ice hockey player (1976).
- Alpo Lintamo, 80, Finnish footballer.
- Sarah Marshall, 80, British actress (The Long, Hot Summer, Star Trek, Dave), cancer.
- Barbara McCarthy, 79, American politician, member of the New Hampshire House of Representatives (2008–2010).
- Gertrude Story, 84, Canadian author and poet.
- Eugenio Cruz Vargas, 90, Chilean poet and painter.
- Frans Vermeyen, 70, Belgian footballer (Lierse, Royal Antwerp), stroke.

=== 19 ===
- Azaria Alon, 95, Ukrainian-born Israeli environmentalist.
- Pierre Charras, 68, French writer, actor and translator.
- Sir Christopher Chataway, 82, British athlete, broadcaster, politician and businessman, MP for Lewisham North (1959–1966) and Chichester (1969–1974), cancer.
- Lindo Ferguson, 90, New Zealand ophthalmologist and politician.
- Steven Fromholz, 68, American entertainer, singer and songwriter, Poet Laureate of Texas (2007), accidental shooting.
- Aslan Gahramanly, 74, Azerbaijani playwright, renal failure.
- Gordon Hessler, 88, British film director (Kiss Meets the Phantom of the Park) and screenwriter.
- Michał Joachimowski, 63, Polish Olympic triple jumper (1972, 1976).
- Tim Jones, 57, Canadian paramedic, cardiac arrest.
- Udo Kasemets, 94, Estonian-born Canadian composer.
- Tsutomu Kawabuchi, 88, Japanese ice hockey player and coach, sepsis.
- Al Lerner, 94, American pianist and composer.
- Erik Nord, 95, Norwegian politician.
- Michael Sporn, 67, American film animator, pancreatic cancer.
- Ben Starr, 92, American television producer and writer (The Brady Bunch, All in the Family, The Facts of Life).
- Stanley Jeyaraja Tambiah, 85, Sri Lankan anthropologist.
- Bert Williams, 93, English footballer (Wolverhampton Wanderers, national team).

=== 20 ===
- Claudio Abbado, 80, Italian conductor.
- Wistin Abela, 80, Maltese politician, Deputy Prime Minister (1981–1983), Finance Minister (1983–1987).
- Tom Bender, 69, Australian basketball player.
- Vern Benson, 89, American baseball player (St. Louis Cardinals) and manager (Atlanta Braves).
- Win Borden, 70, American politician, Minnesota State Senator (1971–1978).
- Ubaldo Continiello, 72, Italian film composer.
- Graeme Dallow, 84, New Zealand police officer.
- Lance E. Davis, 85, American economic historian.
- Armen Hovhannisyan, 19, Armenian Nagorno-Karabakh soldier, shot.
- Kiyoharu Ishiwata, 73, Japanese politician, member of the House of Councillors (1989–2001), heart failure.
- James Jacks, 66, American film producer (The Mummy, Mallrats, Dazed and Confused), heart attack.
- José Isabel Jiménez, 98, Mexican baseball journalist.
- Fred Joiner, 84, American politician.
- Leslie Lee, 83, American playwright, complications from heart failure.
- Jumber Lominadze, 83, Georgian physicist.
- John Mackey, 96, Irish-born New Zealand Roman Catholic prelate, Bishop of Auckland (1974–1983).
- Hans Meuer, 77, German computer scientist.
- Otis G. Pike, 92, American politician, United States Representative from New York (1961–1979).
- George Scott, 84, Scottish-born Canadian wrestler, lung cancer.
- Wilfrid St Clair Tisdall, 92, British army major.
- Pete Titanic, 93, Canadian football player (Toronto Argonauts).
- Jonas Trinkūnas, 74, Lithuanian ethnologist and religion folklorist, founder of Romuva.
- Michael Vosse, 72, American writer and publicist.

=== 21 ===
- Myril Axelrod Bennett, 93, American businesswoman, heart failure.
- Dieter Bortfeldt, 72, British graphic designer and philatelist.
- G. Thompson Brown, 92, American missionary and theologian.
- Ramón Cora, 84, Cuban Olympic rower.
- Tony Crook, 93, English racing driver.
- Jocelyn Hay, 86, British broadcasting campaigner.
- Tim Hosley, 66, American baseball player (Oakland Athletics).
- Solomon Tilewa Johnson, 59, Gambian Anglican prelate, Archbishop of West Africa (since 2012).
- Bill Kresse, 80, American cartoonist.
- Warren Lamb, 90, British management consultant.
- René Maury, 85, French lawyer and economist.
- Wilford Moore, 94, American college football coach (McMurry Indians).
- Natalie Myburgh, 73, South African Olympic swimmer (1956).
- Marcel Ostiguy, 84, Canadian politician.
- Tony Pabón, 74, American singer, trumpeter and bandleader.
- Chuck Quilter, 89, American football player (BC Lions, San Francisco 49ers, Edmonton Eskimos).
- Joel L. Shin, 45, American lawyer and policy adviser, heart attack.
- Dick Shrider, 90, American college basketball coach and athletic director (Miami RedHawks).
- Georgi Slavkov, 55, Bulgarian footballer, heart attack.
- Rhonda Small, 88, Australian filmmaker.
- Graham Stevenson, 58, English cricketer, complications from stroke.
- Roar Woldum, 81, Norwegian Olympic swimmer.
- George C. Wortley, 87, American politician, United States Representative from New York (1981–1989).

=== 22 ===
- Luis Ávalos, 67, Cuban-born American actor (The Electric Company, Stir Crazy, Hollywood Homicide), heart failure.
- Arthur Bellamy, 71, English footballer.
- Charles A. Berg, 87, American politician.
- Martin S. Bergmann, 100, American psychology professor and actor (Crimes and Misdemeanors).
- Fred Bertelmann, 88, German singer and actor.
- Alice Besseling, 69, Dutch politician.
- Patrick Brooking, 76, British army major general.
- Saidi Bwanamdogo, 45, Tanzanian politician, MP for Chalinze (since 2010).
- Roy Cicala, 74, American record producer and sound engineer.
- Chet Curtis, 74, American television anchor, pancreatic cancer.
- François Deguelt, 81, French singer.
- Robert Domergue, 92, French football player and manager.
- Pierre Jalbert, 89, Canadian actor (Combat!) and skier, heart attack.
- John Kabaireho, 91, Ugandan politician, Prime Minister of dependent Ankole Kingdom (1960–1963).
- Manuel Leguineche, 72, Spanish journalist.
- Carlo Mazzacurati, 57, Italian film director.
- Serhiy Nigoyan, 20, Ukrainian protester (Euromaidan), shot.
- Maziar Partow, 81, Iranian cinematographer, heart disease.
- Mark Peattie, 83, French-born American Japanologist.
- Ernestine Pollards, 72, American Olympic sprinter.
- Akkineni Nageswara Rao, 90, Indian actor (Chenchu Lakshmi, Sri Krishnarjuna Yuddham, Premabhishekam) and film producer, Dadasaheb Phalke Award (1990), cancer.
- Carlos Semino, 84, Argentine Olympic rower.
- Dhirubhai Thaker, 95, Indian Gujarati writer, multiple ailments.
- Wando, 13, Canadian Thoroughbred racehorse, heart attack.

=== 23 ===
- Henri Ackermann, 91, Luxembourgish cyclist.
- Ted Bottiger, 81, American politician, Washington State Senator (1973–1987), State Representative (1965–1972).
- Robert Coldsnow, 89, American politician, member of the Kansas House of Representatives (1965–1970).
- Violetta Ferrari, 83, Hungarian actress.
- Franz Gabl, 93, Austrian Olympic alpine skier (1948).
- Moshe Gil, 92, Israeli historian.
- Wolfhart Heinrichs, 72, German scholar.
- Yuri Izrael, 83, Russian meteorologist.
- JewWario, 42, American internet personality (Channel Awesome), suicide by gunshot.
- Khin Yu May, 76, Burmese actress and singer.
- Katsuyo Kobayashi, 76, Japanese food critic (Iron Chef), multiple organ failure.
- Mille Marković, 52, Yugoslav-born Swedish sex club owner, convicted criminal and boxer, shot.
- Uroš Marović, 68, Yugoslav Olympic champion water polo player (1968).
- Kazys Morkūnas, 88, Lithuanian stained glass artist.
- Lew Massey, 57, American basketball player (Charlotte 49ers).
- Ivar Moe, 91, Norwegian lawyer and politician.
- Elmira Nazirova, 85, Azerbaijani composer.
- Riz Ortolani, 87, Italian film composer.
- Charlie Osgood, 87, American baseball player (Brooklyn Dodgers).
- Jan Pesman, 82, Dutch Olympic bronze-medalist speed skater (1960).
- Eugene Schlickman, 84, American politician, member of the Illinois House of Representatives (1964–1980).
- Garnett Spears, 5, American child, salt poisoning.
- S. Sriskandarajah, 60, Sri Lankan judge and lawyer.
- Béla Várady, 60, Hungarian Olympic silver medallist footballer (1972).
- James Wynne, 76, American Olympic rower.

=== 24 ===
- Shulamit Aloni, 85, Israeli politician, leader of the Meretz party.
- Jay S. Amyx, 90, American politician, Mayor of Boise (1966–1974).
- Knut Aukland, 84, Norwegian physiologist.
- Igor Badamshin, 47, Russian Olympic cross-country skier, heart attack.
- Curt Brasket, 81, American chess player.
- Lisa Daniely, 84, British actress (The Invisible Man, Doctor Who, The First Churchills).
- Abdelkader El Brazi, 49, Moroccan footballer, cancer.
- Aguinaldo Fonseca, 91, Cape Verdean poet.
- Peter Hearne, 86, British engineer.
- Joseph Kalite, Central African health minister, machete attack.
- Sahal Mahfudh, 76, Indonesian spiritual leader (Nahdlatul Ulama).
- Boyd Oxlade, 70, Australian author and screenwriter (Death in Brunswick), cancer.
- Rafael Pineda Ponce, 83, Honduran educator and politician, President of the National Congress (1998–2002), kidney failure.
- Maren-Sofie Røstvig, 93, Norwegian literary historian.

=== 25 ===
- Bruce Barmes, 84, American baseball player (Washington Senators).
- Marcelino Bilbao Bilbao, 94, Spanish military officer.
- Jack Brain, 93, Australian footballer.
- Otto Burri, 86, Swiss Olympic rower.
- David Cairns, 88, English cricketer.
- Adelfa Botello Callejo, 90, American lawyer and civil rights activist, brain cancer.
- Arthur Doyle, 69, American jazz musician.
- Jimmy Dupree, 77, American boxer.
- Robert F. Goldsworthy, 96, American politician.
- Eric Green, South African rear admiral, Flag Officer Fleet (1999–2005), aortic aneurysm.
- Heini Halberstam, 88, Czech-born British mathematician.
- John R. Huizenga, 92, American physicist, heart failure.
- Larry Kramer, 71, American football player and coach.
- Kurt Krenn, 77, Austrian Roman Catholic prelate, Bishop of Sankt Pölten (1991–2004).
- Jacques Meslier, 85, French Olympic water polo player (1960).
- Nasser Minachi, 82, Iranian politician.
- Sam Morley, 81, American football player (Washington Redskins) and lawyer, complications from heart failure.
- John Robertson, 79, Canadian journalist.
- Milan Ružić, 58, Croatian footballer.
- Emanuel Saldaño, 28, Argentine cyclist, national road race champion (2011), traffic collision.
- Dave Strack, 90, American basketball player and coach (Michigan Wolverines), pneumonia.
- Gyula Sax, 62, Hungarian chess player, heart attack.
- Pius Tirkey, 85, Indian politician, MLA for Alipurduars (1977–1996).
- Morrie Turner, 90, American cartoonist (Wee Pals).
- Dennis Wirgowski, 66, American football player (New England Patriots, Philadelphia Eagles).

=== 26 ===
- Laver Bariu, 84, Albanian folk clarinetist and singer.
- Stephen Clapp, 74, American violinist and music educator, Dean of the Juilliard School (1994–2007).
- Renzo Colzi, 76, French Olympic cyclist (1956).
- Ollie Conmy, 74, Irish footballer.
- Mike Flanagan, 85, British-born Israeli soldier.
- Juanita García, 83, Colombian-born American singer.
- Tom Gola, 81, American basketball player (Philadelphia Warriors) and politician.
- Paula Gruden, 92, Australian poet and translator.
- Oleg Imrekov, 51, Russian football player and manager.
- Paavo Kotila, 86, Finnish Olympic long-distance runner (1956).
- Margery Mason, 100, English actress (The Princess Bride, Harry Potter and the Goblet of Fire, Love Actually).
- Maynard Miller, 93, American politician.
- John Farquhar Munro, 79, Scottish politician, MSP for Ross, Skye and Inverness West (1999–2011).
- Tom Nyuma, Sierra Leonean politician and military officer.
- José Emilio Pacheco, 74, Mexican poet, essayist and novelist, winner of the Miguel de Cervantes Prize (2009), heart attack.
- Gino Polidori, 72, American politician, member of the Michigan House of Representatives (2005–2010), prostate cancer.
- Miguel Romero, 68–69, Spanish politician and activist, cancer.
- Karl Slym, 51, British business executive, managing director of Tata Motors (since 2012), self-defenestration.
- Patrick D. Smith, 87, American author (A Land Remembered).
- Gerald B. Whitham, 86, British applied mathematician.
- Rusty York, 78, American musician.
- Doris Witiuk, 84, American AAGPBL baseball player (Racine Belles, Battle Creek Belles).

=== 27 ===
- Haji Bakr, Iraqi militant (ISIL), shot. (death announced on this date)
- Masako Bandō, 55, Japanese novelist, winner of the Naoki Prize (1996), tongue cancer.
- Georges Breitman, 93, French Olympic athlete.
- Robert F. Burt, 65, American Navy officer, multiple myeloma.
- Ann Carter, 77, American child actress (The Curse of the Cat People), ovarian cancer.
- Mimi Cazort, 83, Canadian writer and curator.
- Stepan Chapman, 63, American author (The Troika).
- Edmond Classen, 75, Dutch actor (Flodder 3, Lijmen/Het Been).
- Theo Ditzler, 77, Swiss sports shooter.
- Brian Gibbs, 77, English footballer and manager.
- Mahalingum Govender, 67–68, South African cricketer.
- Jerome Gross, 96, American biologist.
- Richard Grossman, 92, American publisher.
- Leen Jansen, 83, Dutch Olympic middleweight boxer (1952).
- Dinesh Medh, 85–86, Indian cricketer.
- Ichirō Nagai, 82, Japanese voice actor (Sazae-san, Space Battleship Yamato), heart attack.
- R. A. Padmanabhan, 97, Indian journalist and historian.
- Pete Seeger, 94, American folk singer and songwriter ("Turn! Turn! Turn!", "If I Had a Hammer").
- Hashem Shabani, 32, Iranian activist, hanging.
- Maurice Tabet, 94, Lebanese Olympic sport shooter.
- Alan Townsend, 92, English cricketer (Warwickshire).
- Masaaki Tsukada, 74, Japanese voice actor (Bleach, One Piece).
- Epimaco Velasco, 79, Filipino politician, Director of the NBI (1992–1995).
- Paul Zorner, 93, German night fighter pilot during World War II.

=== 28 ===
- Qasim Akhgar, 62–63, Afghan activist, heart attack.
- Hank Autry, 66, American football player (Houston Oilers).
- Justin Back, 18, American student, stabbed.
- Bill Boivin, 99, Canadian football player.
- John Bothwell, 87, Canadian Anglican bishop.
- Frédéric Bruly Bouabré, 91, Ivorian artist.
- John Cacavas, 83, American television score composer (Kojak, Hawaii Five-O).
- Harry Gamble, 82, American football executive (Philadelphia Eagles) and head coach (Penn Quakers).
- Gennady Grushevoy, 63, Belarusian philosopher and politician.
- Dwight Gustafson, 83, American composer and conductor.
- Maureen T. Hallinan, 73, American sociologist.
- Pravin Hansraj, 75, Indian cricketer.
- Hans Huber, 84, German Olympic ice hockey player.
- Nigel Jenkins, 64, Welsh poet, pancreatic cancer.
- Herb Kirsh, 84, American politician, member of the South Carolina House of Representatives (1978–2010).
- John Kreamcheck, 88, American football player (Chicago Bears).
- Sven Kullander, 78, Swedish physicist.
- Fernand Leduc, 97, Canadian abstract painter, cancer.
- Ted Nealon, 84, Irish journalist and politician, TD for Sligo–Leitrim (1981–1997).
- Gudō Wafu Nishijima, 94, Japanese Zen Buddhist priest and teacher.
- Jorge Obeid, 66, Argentine politician, Governor of Santa Fe (1995–1999, 2003–2007), pulmonary embolism.
- Blas Piñar, 95, Spanish politician, founder of New Force.
- Bill Pritchett, 92, Australian public servant, Secretary of the Department of Defence (1979–1984).
- Veikko Rantanen, 82, Finnish Olympic wrestler.
- Kenneth Rose, 89, British journalist and author.
- Kazuhiko Sakazaki, 76, Japanese baseball player (Yomiuri Giants), stomach cancer.
- Tom Sherak, 68, American film producer and studio executive, President of AMPAS (2009–2012), prostate cancer.
- António Soares Carneiro, 86, Portuguese politician and military officer.
- Barry Spacks, 82, American poet.
- Sue Wallis, 56, American politician, member of the Wyoming House of Representatives (since 2007).
- Stevie Woods, 62, American R&B singer, complications from diabetes.
- Renzo Zanazzi, 89, Italian cyclist.

=== 29 ===
- Johnny Allen, 96, American music arranger (Shaft), complications from pneumonia.
- Rahmanberdi Alyhanow, 28, Turkmen footballer, failed operation.
- Stefan Bałuk, 100, Polish general and photographer.
- Biko, 30, American Olympic eventing horse (1996), euthanized.
- François Cavanna, 90, French author and satirical newspaper editor.
- Colonel Meow, 2, American Himalayan-Persian cat, Guinness World Record holder for longest fur.
- George Griffiths, 80, New Zealand historian.
- John LaMotta, 75, American actor (ALF, American Ninja, ER).
- Lars Andreas Larssen, 78, Norwegian actor, Alzheimer's disease.
- Eirian Llwyd, 63, Welsh printmaker, cancer.
- Zoe MacKinnon, 55, Canadian Olympic field hockey player (1984), cancer.
- Jim Mansfield, 74, Irish businessman.
- Theodore Millon, 85, American psychologist, heart disease.
- Aïché Nana, 77, Turkish showgirl and actress.
- Zdeněk Němec, 80, Czech Olympic discus thrower.
- Vytautas Norkus, 93, Lithuanian-born American basketball player.
- Robert Resnick, 91, American physicist, educator and author.
- Jim Rone, 78, British Anglican clergy, Archdeacon of Wisbech (1984–1993).
- Ildefonso P. Santos Jr., 84, Filipino landscape architect, heart failure.
- Tarit Kumar Sett, 83, Indian Olympic cyclist (1952).
- Jack Stoddard, 87, Canadian ice hockey player (New York Rangers).
- Piers Wedgwood, 4th Baron Wedgwood, 59, British aristocrat, cardiac failure.
- Lewis Yablonsky, 89, American sociologist and criminologist.

=== 30 ===
- Abdullah Omran Taryam, 65–66, Emirati journalist, stroke.
- Marie Axton, 76, American scholar.
- Jean Babilée, 90, French dancer and choreographer.
- Krzysztof Birula-Białynicki, 69, Polish Olympic ice hockey player (1972).
- John Branthwaite, 86, New Zealand Anglican priest.
- John Carty, 63, Irish politician, TD for Mayo (2002–2007), Senator (2007–2011).
- Danielle Downey, 33, American golfer and coach, traffic collision.
- Greater, c. 83, Australian greater flamingo, world's oldest flamingo, euthanized.
- Russell D. Hemenway, 88, American political activist.
- Campbell Lane, 78, Canadian actor (Cool Runnings, The X-Files, Scary Movie 4), lung cancer.
- John Luton, 91, American politician.
- William Motzing, 77, American-born Australian composer, conductor and arranger.
- Marioara Murărescu, 66, Romanian television producer.
- Mr Tiz, 29, New Zealand racehorse.
- Benedict John Osta, 82, Indian Roman Catholic prelate, Archbishop of Patna (1980–2007).
- Jim Parsley, 86, American stock car racing driver.
- Cornelius Pasichny, 86, Canadian Ukrainian Catholic hierarch, Bishop of Saskatoon (1996–1998) and Toronto (1998–2003).
- Arthur Rankin Jr., 89, American director, producer and writer, co-founder of Rankin/Bass Productions.
- Helmut Röhrl, 86, German mathematician.
- Suzanne Scotchmer, 64, American economist, intestinal cancer.
- The Mighty Hannibal, 74, American R&B, soul and funk singer, songwriter and record producer.
- Bishwonath Upadhyaya, 83, Nepalese judge and jurist, Chief Justice (1991–1995), brain haemorrhage.

=== 31 ===
- Adegboyega Folaranmi Adedoyin, 91, Nigerian-born British Olympic athlete (1948).
- Inatio Akaruru, 76, Cook Islands politician.
- Nina Andrycz, 101, Polish actress and poet.
- Sebastian Barker, 68, British poet, cardiac arrest.
- Deborah Blackwell, 63, American cable network executive (SOAPnet) and talent agent, Pick's disease.
- Gundi Busch, 78, German world champion and Olympic figure skater.
- Emilio Del Giudice, 74, Italian biophysicist.
- Bob DePratu, 74, American politician, member of the Montana Senate (1995–2004).
- Buddy Esquire, 55, American graphic artist, smoke inhalation.
- Francis M. Fesmire, 54, American cardiologist and emergency physician.
- Anna Gordy Gaye, 92, American songwriter ("Baby, I'm for Real"), co-founder of Anna Records.
- Carsten Hopstock, 89, Norwegian historian.
- Jaime Huélamo, 65, Spanish Olympic cyclist (1972).
- Abdirizak Haji Hussein, 90, Former Somali Prime Minister, pneumonia(1964–1967).
- Alexander Ivashkin, 65, Russian cellist, cancer.
- Miklós Jancsó, 92, Hungarian director and screenwriter.
- Joseph Willcox Jenkins, 85, American composer and academic.
- Christopher Jones, 72, American actor (The Legend of Jesse James, Ryan's Daughter, The Looking Glass War), cancer.
- Cliff Leeming, 93, English footballer (Bury, Tranmere Rovers).
- Hans Methlie Michelsen, 93, Norwegian judge and Holocaust survivor, Attorney General of Norway (1962–1972).
- Thomas Montemage, 87, American Olympic cyclist.
- Baden Powell, 82, British footballer.
- Sir David Price, 89, British politician, MP for Eastleigh (1955–1992).
- Mike Reed, 39, American football player (Philadelphia Eagles), cancer.
- Kenneth Saggers, 77, South African cricketer.
- Giorgio Stracquadanio, 54, Italian politician and journalist, lung cancer.
- Kura Strickland, 84, Cook Islands politician.
- James B. Tapp, 93, American Air Force pilot and flying ace.
- Wong Choon Wah, 66, Malaysian Olympic footballer (1972).
