= Armando Rodríguez =

Armando Rodríguez may refer to:

- Armando Rodríguez (journalist) (c. 1968–2008), murdered Mexican journalist who covered crime for El Diario de Juárez
- Armando Rodríguez González (1889–1965), Cuban composer and musician
- Armando Rodriguez (businessman) (1918–2014), Cuban-American entrepreneur who was one of the first Cuban rafters
