= Tuell =

Tuell is a surname. Notable people with the surname include:

- Fanny Tuell, a.k.a. Faye Adams, (1923–2016), American singer
- Jack Tuell (1923–2014), American Methodist minister and equal-rights advocate

== See also ==
- Tuel
