= Frascarelli =

Frascarelli is an Italian surname. Notable people with the surname include:

- Andrei Frascarelli (born 1973), Brazilian footballer
- Damián Frascarelli (born 1985), Uruguayan footballer
- Giuseppe Frascarelli (c. 1923–2004), Italian footballer
- Leonida Frascarelli (1906–1991), Italian cyclist
