= Emiel =

Emiel is a Dutch cognate of the masculine given name Emil. People with the name include:

- Emiel Boersma (born 1980), Dutch beach volleyball player
- Emiel Christensen (1895–1988), American architect from Nebraska
- Emiel Jozef De Smedt (1909–1995), Belgian Bishop of Bruges
- Emiel Faignaert (1919–1980), Belgian cyclist
- Emiel van Lennep (1915–1996), Dutch diplomat and Minister of State
- Emiel Mellaard (born 1966), Dutch long jumper
- Emiel Pauwels (1918–2014), Belgian track and field athlete
- Emiel Pijnaker Dutch film producer, composer and singer
- Emiel Puttemans (born 1947), Belgian middle- and long-distance runner
- Emiel Rogiers (1923–1998), Belgian racing cyclist
- Emiel Van Cauter (1931–1975), Belgian racing cyclist
- Emiel van Heurck (1871–1931), Belgian folklorist
- Emiel Wastyn (born 1992), Belgian racing cyclist
