= Qaçaq Kərəm =

Coordinates: 41°07′N 45°27′E

Qaçaq Kərəm (until 1992, Oraq-Çəkic) is a village in the municipality of Xətai in the Agstafa Rayon of Azerbaijan.
