= Aslan Gahramanly =

Aslan Gahraman oglu Gahramanly (14 September 1939 – 20 January 2014) was an Azerbaijani playwright and scholar. Gahramanly's plays Spectrum, Donge, Burulgan, I'm Looking for You and Forgive were adapted for Azerbaijani television. The Azerbaijani radio broadcast thirteen fairy tale plays by Gahramanly.

== Biography ==
Gahramanly was born in Yenigyun. Having graduated from the mechanical and mathematical faculty of Azerbaijan State University, he started work in the Computing Center of the Azerbaijan National Academy of Sciences in 1961. Gahramanly was the author and co-author of several scholarly publications. In 1967 Gahramanly made his writing debut in the almanac Ganj galamlar with the short story "A Song of Mountains". In 1985 he became a member of the Writers Union of Azerbaijan.

In his later life, Gahramanly suffered from kidney failure and died in the evening on 20 January 2014.
