= Tuel =

Tuel is a surname. Notable people with the surname include:

- Jeff Tuel (born 1991), American football player
- Laurent Tuel (born 1966), French film actor, director, and writer

== See also ==
- Tuell
