= January 2014 Kabul restaurant attack =

Suicide bomb attack at a restaurant

Coordinates: 34.537°N 69.181°E

- Part of War in Afghanistan (2001–present)
- Kabul (Afghanistan)
- Location: Kabul, Afghanistan
- Date: 17 January 2014
- Attack type: Suicide bombing, mass shooting
- Weapons: Bomb, guns
- Deaths: 21 (+1 bomber)
- Perpetrator: Taliban

On January 17, 2014, a suicide bomber detonated explosives at the gate of the Taverna du Liban, a heavily fortified restaurant in Kabul popular with foreign nationals, including diplomats, humanitarian aid workers and journalists; two gunmen then entered the building and began "shooting indiscriminately." 21 people were slain.

The Taliban immediately claimed responsibility for the attack.

== Casualties ==
Victims by nationality
| Nationality | Dead |
|---|---|
| Afghanistan | 8 |
| Lebanon | 2 |
| United Kingdom | 2 |
| Canada | 2 |
| United States | 2 |
| Denmark | 1 |
| Malaysia | 1 |
| Russia | 1 |
| Pakistan | 1 |
| Somalia | 1 |
| Total | 21 |

- Wabel Abdallah, head of the Afghanistan office of the International Monetary Fund.
- Alexandros Petersen, a scholar of energy and of the geopolitics of the Caucasus and Central Asia. Petersen had recently joined the faculty at the American University in Kabul.

== See also ==
- List of terrorist attacks in Kabul
