= Xətai, Agstafa =

Xətai
- Municipality
- Location within Azerbaijan
- Coordinates: 41°07′38″N 45°28′40″E
- Country: Azerbaijan
- Rayon: Agstafa

Population
  - Total: 5,738
- Time zone: UTC+4 (AZT)
  - Summer (DST): UTC+5 (AZT)

Xətai (until 1992, Marksovka) is a village and municipality in the Agstafa Rayon of Azerbaijan. It has a population of 5,738. The municipality consists of the villages of Xətai, Qaçaq Kərəm, and Yenigün.

== Notable natives ==
- Ilham Hasanov — National Hero of Azerbaijan.
