= Endre Senkálszky =

Romanian actor and director

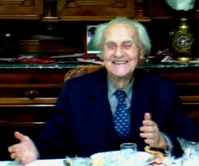
- Endre Senkálszky in October 2010
- Born: 2 October 1914; Kolozsvár, Austria-Hungary (today: Cluj-Napoca, Romania)
- Died: 5 January 2014 (aged 99); Cluj-Napoca, Romania
- Occupations: Actor, director
- Years active: 1939–2010

Endre Senkálszky (Hungarian pronunciation: [ˈɛndrɛ ˈʃɛŋkaːlski]; 2 October 1914 – 5 January 2014) was a Romanian actor and director.

Endre Senkálszky was an ethnic Hungarian. He died on 5 January 2014, aged 99, in his hometown of Cluj-Napoca.
