= Mille Marković =

Swedish boxer

- Born: Milentije Marković; 11 June 1961; Kragujevac, Serbia, Yugoslavia
- Died: 23 January 2014 (aged 52); Stockholm, Sweden
- Occupations: Boxer, sex club owner

Milentije Marković (Serbian Cyrillic: Милентије "Миле" Марковић; 11 June 1961 – 23 January 2014), known as Mille Marković, was a Yugoslavian-born Swedish professional boxer, an owner of a sex club, and a convicted criminal and gangster. He died from gunshot wounds to the head on 23 January 2014 in Ulvsunda, a suburb of Stockholm.

== Biography ==
Marković, an ethnic Serb, was born in Yugoslavia. His mother was murdered when he was three years old. He emigrated with his father to Sweden, where he obtained citizenship in 1982. Marković was an amateur and professional boxer. In 1977, at age 16, he won the Swedish boxing championship title in the bantamweight division. He later turned professional, fighting in the welterweight division. He retired from professional boxing in 1989.

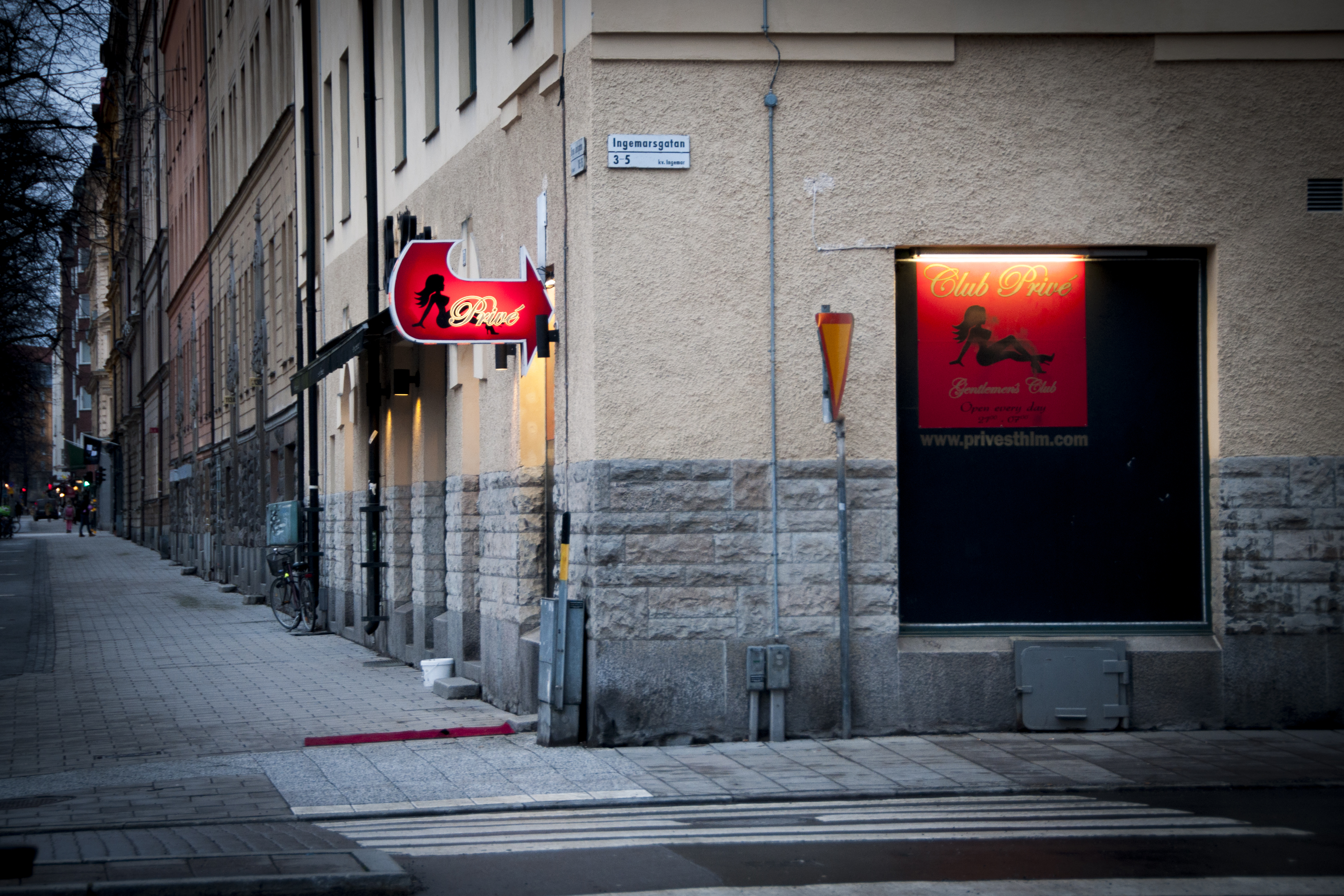
"Club Privé" in Stockholm was once owned by Marković

After his sporting career ended, in the mid-1990s Marković ran a Stockholm sex club called "Club Privé", before ownership was transferred to former policeman Ljubomir Pilipović, and eventually to ex-ice hockey player Michael Badelt. Marković was convicted of criminal charges on several occasions. In June 1995, he was convicted and sentenced to a one-year jail term for using or attempting to use extortion and inflicting serious damage.

Marković had fitted a room in his club with hidden cameras and planned to lure celebrities there, film the victims having sex and consuming drugs, and use the footage for blackmail.

In 2008, Marković was convicted of serious tax and accounting fraud, weapons and drugs offences, and receiving stolen goods. In late 2009, he was sentenced on two counts of assault and drug offences. In 2011, he was convicted of fraudulently receiving social benefits on the pretext that he was sick and unemployed. In 2013, he was charged with inciting and planning a shooting on May 10 of that year after a long legal dispute with Michael Badelt.

Marković was named as one of the alleged sources for Thomas Sjöberg, Deanne Rauscher and Tove Meyer's controversial biography of King Carl XVI Gustaf of Sweden, Carl XVI Gustaf – Den motvillige monarken, which was published in November 2010.

In May 2011, Marković claimed to be in possession of compromising photographs of the king visiting sex clubs in the 1980s. The photograph he reproduced was later proven to be a hoax that had been manipulated electronically from earlier images. In 2012, Beata Hansson and Deanne Rauscher published a biography titled Mille Markovic: the biography.

== Death ==
On 23 January 2014, Marković was shot in the head four times and fatally wounded by two unknown assailants in Ulvsunda, a western suburb of Stockholm near his home. Swedish police found Marković alive in the driver's seat of his car, but his life could not be saved. Four months later, in May 2014, three people were arrested in connection with the murder of Marković. All three suspects were later released.

== Professional boxing record ==
4 fights	1 win	2 losses
By knockout	1	1
By decision	0	1
Draws	1	

No.	Result	Record	Opponent	Type	Round, time	Date	Location	Notes
4	Loss	1–2–1	(United Kingdom) Michael Ayers	TKO	2 (6), 1:55	1989-11-15	(United Kingdom) Lewisham Theatre, Lewisham, London, England	
3	Loss	1–1–1	(Finland) Tom Heiskanen	MD	8	1988-09-11	UKK Halli, Laukaa, Finland	
2	Draw	1–0–1	(Finland) Keijo Pyykko	MD	6	1988-05-15	Tampere Ice Stadium, Tampere, Finland	
1	Win	1–0	(United Kingdom) Gary Muir	KO	1 (6), 2:24	1988-02-07	UKK Halli, Laukaa, Finland	Professional debut.
