= George Wilson (Australian footballer) =

Australian rules footballer

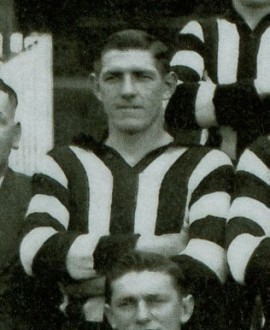
- Wilson during his Collingwood career

Personal information
- Full name: George Patterson Wilson
- Born: 28 May 1920; Melbourne, Victoria
- Died: 3 January 2014 (aged 93)
- Original team: Abbotsford
- Height: 178 cm (5 ft 10 in)
- Weight: 78 kg (172 lb)

Playing career^{1}
Years	Club	Games (Goals)
1942–43	Collingwood	10 (0)
1944	St Kilda	2 (0)
Total		12 (0)
- ^{1} Playing statistics correct to the end of 1944.

George Patterson Wilson (28 May 1920 – 3 January 2014) was an Australian rules footballer who played with Collingwood and St Kilda in the Victorian Football League (VFL).
