= Gatluak Deng Garang =

South Sudanese politician (1953–2014)

Gatluak Deng Garang (March 1953 – January 13, 2014) was a South Sudanese politician and general. He served as the Chairman of the Southern Sudan Coordination Council from 2001 to 2002 and the Governor of Upper Nile from 2008 to 2009 prior to the country's independence from Sudan.

Born in Nasir, Sudan, (present-day South Sudan), he died from an illness in Cairo, Egypt, on January 13, 2014, at the age of 59.
