= Rashaad Galant =

South African cricketer (1947–2014)

Personal information
- Born: 8 September 1947; Claremont, Cape Town, South Africa
- Died: 6 January 2014 (aged 66); Ottery, Cape Town, South Africa
- Source: ESPNcricinfo, 17 May 2016

Rashaad Galant (8 September 1947 – 6 January 2014) was a South African cricketer. He played fifteen first-class matches for Transvaal (SACB) between 1982 and 1986.

== Career ==
Rashaad Galant began playing for Transvaal at age 35. Galant ended his career in 1986 at age 39.
