= Richard Brett (theatre consultant) =

First Theatre Consultant

Richard Brett CEng FIEE
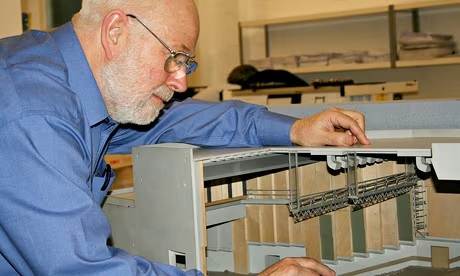
- Brett with a model of the Queen Elizabeth Hall at the Southbank Centre, London
- Born: 24 January 1939; Croydon, England
- Died: 9 January 2014 (aged 74)
- Occupation: Theatre consultant
- Known for: Stage engineering of the National Theatre in London

Richard Brett CEng FIEE (1939–2014) was a British stage engineer and is sometimes considered the first ever Theatre consultant.

Born in Croydon in 1939, he worked at the BBC as a senior planning and installation engineer working on the introduction of colour television, until hired by Richard Pilbrow to join the newly-built National Theatre in London in 1967. Pilbrow considered Brett the 'leading stage engineer of our time'. In 1985 he left the National, forming his own theatre consultancy Technical Planning, now known as Theatreplan.

His reputation for innovative designs was forged by notable projects including the power flying system and drum revolve at the National Theatre and the use of air bearings at the Royal & Derngate.

Brett was chairman of the ABTT and the Society of Theatre Consultants (now the Institute of Theatre Consultants), and founded quadrennial conference ITEAC. In 2023, Brett was included in the 'Engineering Icons Tube Map' by Transport for London and The Royal Academy of Engineering, placing him at London Waterloo station next to the National Theatre.

He died in 2014.

== Books ==
Richard contributed to several books in his lifetime, including Copenhagen Opera House and the ABTT's Theatre Buildings: A Design Guide.
