= John Button (racing driver) =

British racing driver

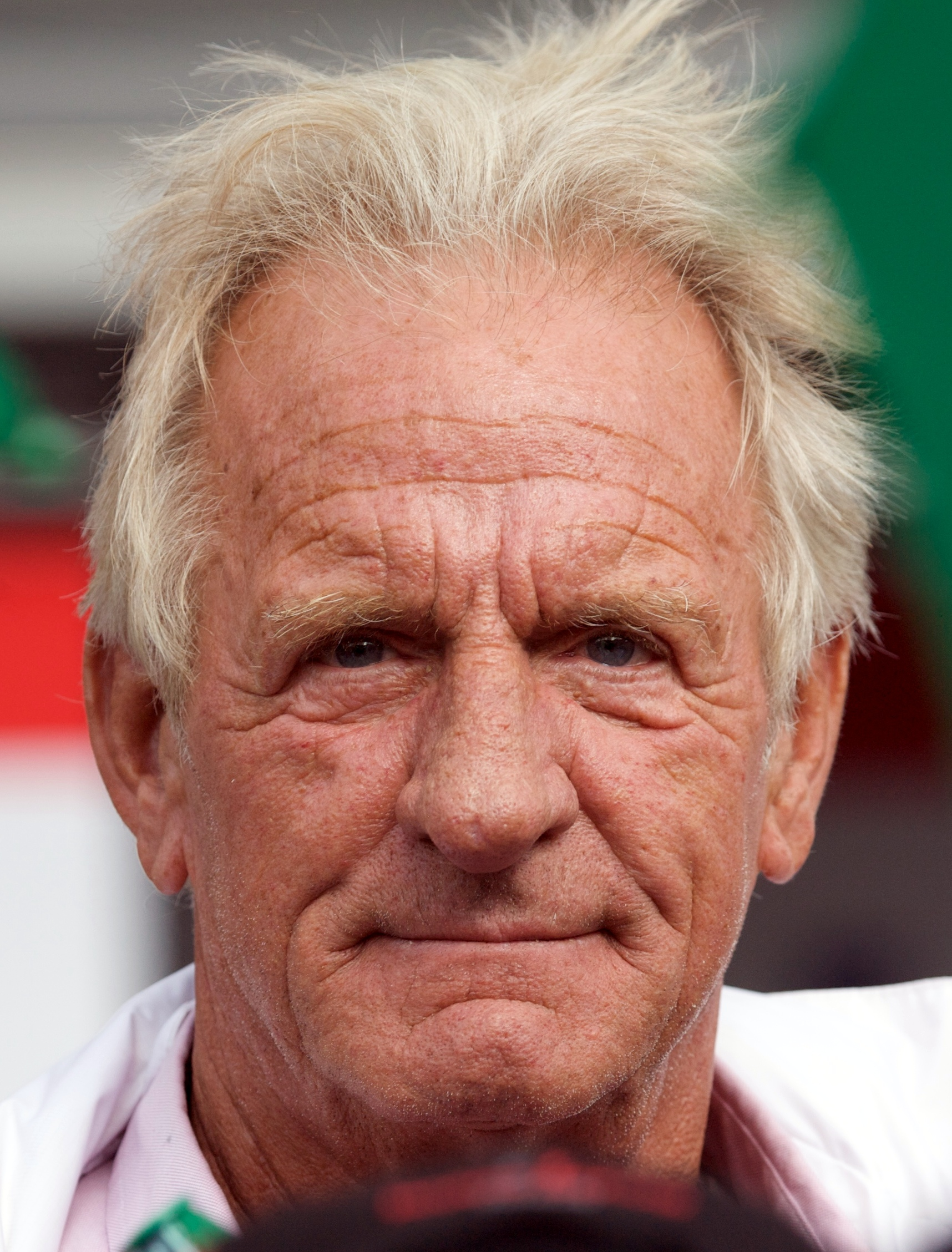
- Button pictured during the 2008 Belgian F1 Grand Prix
- Born: 27 July 1943; East London, UK
- Died: 12 January 2014 (aged 70); Southern France
- Occupation: Rallycross Driver
- Years active: 1970s
- Known for: father of Jenson Button
- Spouse: Simone Lyons
- Children: 4, including Jenson

John Button (27 July 1943 – 12 January 2014) was an English rallycross driver and the father of 2009 Formula One World Champion Jenson Button. His best overall results were both in 1976, as the runner-up in the Embassy/RAC-MSA British Rallycross and TEAC/Lydden Rallycross championships.

== Biography and racing career ==
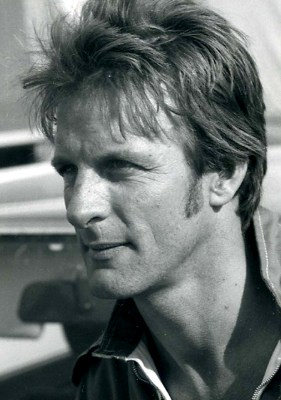
Rallycrosser John Button in 1978

Button was born on 27 July 1943 in London. During the 1970s he became well known in the UK for his so-called (because of its striking paintwork) Colorado Beetle Volkswagen with eventually 2.1-litre engine. Later on he competed less successfully for a couple of years in a Volkswagen Golf Mk1 with 1.9-litre engine, run by his own VW-Audi dealership and tuning garage Autoconti of Trowbridge in Wiltshire.

John Button created Rocket Motorsport when Jenson Button started karting and it has won 11 junior karting championships. The performance of his Rocket engines in the Cadet class helped many up-and-coming youngsters, including Lewis Hamilton.

Button, who was nicknamed "Papa Smurf" by his son, gained much airtime during Formula One coverage in 2009 (particularly on the BBC) when Jenson won six out of the first seven races of the season.

Until his death, Button attended every single Grand Prix of his son's career, apart from the 2001 Brazilian Grand Prix when he was unable to make it because of illness.

== Death ==
Button died at the age of 70 at his home in the south of France from a suspected head injury on 12 January 2014, although the exact circumstances are not fully established. He had been out for dinner with Richard Goddard (Button's manager), and stopped for a nightcap at the bar, La Rascasse. At some point Button left the bar on his own, and it wasn't until evening the next day when Goddard became concerned at repeated missed calls, that he decided to check on Button at his home. Upon arriving, Goddard found the keys in the gate to the house. Letting himself in, Goddard found Button's body on the steps leading up to the house.

The most likely sequence of events is that at some point between leaving the bar and his car, Button had fallen and hit his head. He had then arrived home, and locked himself out of the house when the gate had shut behind him with his keys still outside. Unable to gain entry to the house as the gate could only be buzzed open from within the house, it is thought that whilst attempting to gain entry he had slipped and fallen again, hitting his head a second time, this time fatally.

In memory of the late John Button, the organisers of the Retro Rallycross Challenge in 2015 created the John Button Memorial Trophy, which is the annual award presented to the Retro Rallycross Driver of the year.
