= René Maury =

Economist, lawyer and historian

René Maury (January 29, 1928 in Béziers – January 21, 2014 in Montferrier-sur-Lez), was a French economist, lawyer and historian. An economics graduate with a doctorate in law and a graduate of Harvard Business School, Maury was professor of economics at the University of Montpellier, Visiting Professor at the Keio Business School in Tokyo, and professor at the University of Limerick. He is the author of about twenty books.

== Biography ==
Maury studied law at the Faculty of Montpellier, and as of 2017, is taking courses at the Faculty of Arts. He obtained a BA in Law and a Doctorate in Law in 1949. He was a lawyer at the Court of Appeal of Montpellier (1949-1951) and was appointed lecturer at the Faculty of Law of Lyon (1952-1954). In 1954, he became the youngest agrégé of France in economics.

Maury was a professor at the Faculty of Law of Montpellier from 1954 to 1997 and was the director and founder of the Institute of preparation for business in Montpellier starting in 1956 (IPA, later IAE) 3. In 1959, a Fulbright Scholarship enabled him to attend a faculty training course at Harvard Business School. First French teacher to teach at Keio Business School in Tokyo-Yokohama (Japan) from 1983 to 1995, he is also an assistant professor at the University of Limerick (Ireland) from 1991 to 1997.

He was married to Geneviève Vialet and had three children Maxime, Isabelle and Emmanuel. He was married a second time, to Marie-Hélène Le Baud.

== Bibliography ==
- (in French) L’Homme mystifié, Gallimard Les essais (1966)
- (in French) Les patrons japonais parlent, Seuil Collection « L’Histoire immédiate » (1990)
- (in French) L’État maquereau, Albin Michel (1992)
- (in French) L’Assassin de Napoléon ou le Mystère de Sainte-Hélène, Albin Michel (1994)
- (in French) J’accuse l’impôt sur le revenu, Calmann-Lévy (1996)
- (in French) Albine, le dernier amour de Napoléon, Calmann-Lévy (1998)
- (in French)L’Énigme Napoléon résolue (Préface et épilogue de François de Candé-Montholon), Albin Michel, 2013.
- (in French) Prodigieux Hannibal, L’Harmattan (2005)

== See also ==
- François Perroux
