= Maya Romanoff =

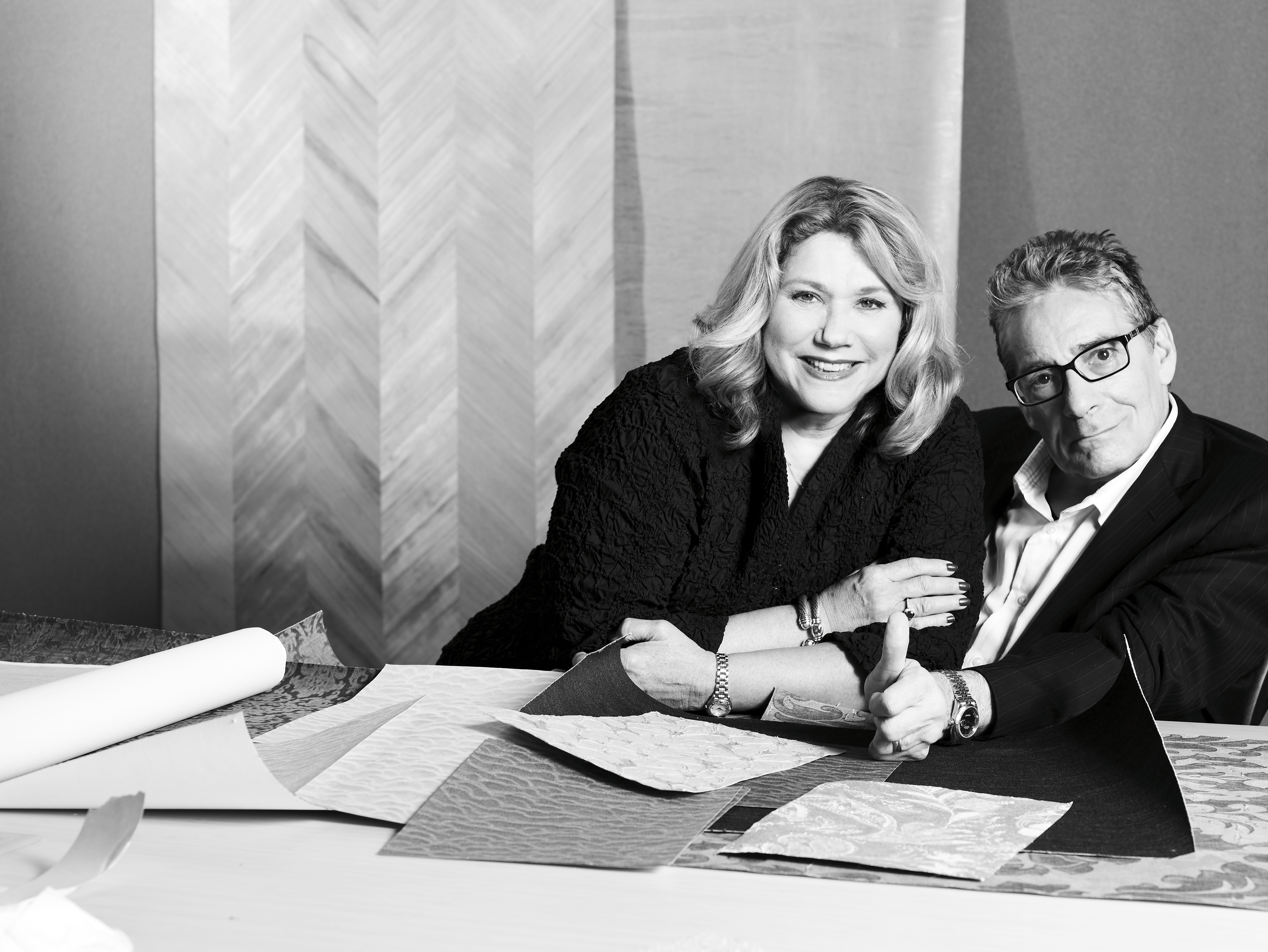
Joyce and Maya Romanoff (right)

Maya Romanoff (born Richard Romanoff; June 30, 1941 – January 15, 2014) was an American artist, inventor, and director of the Maya Romanoff Corporation, a manufacturer of wall covering and surfacing materials.

== Biography ==
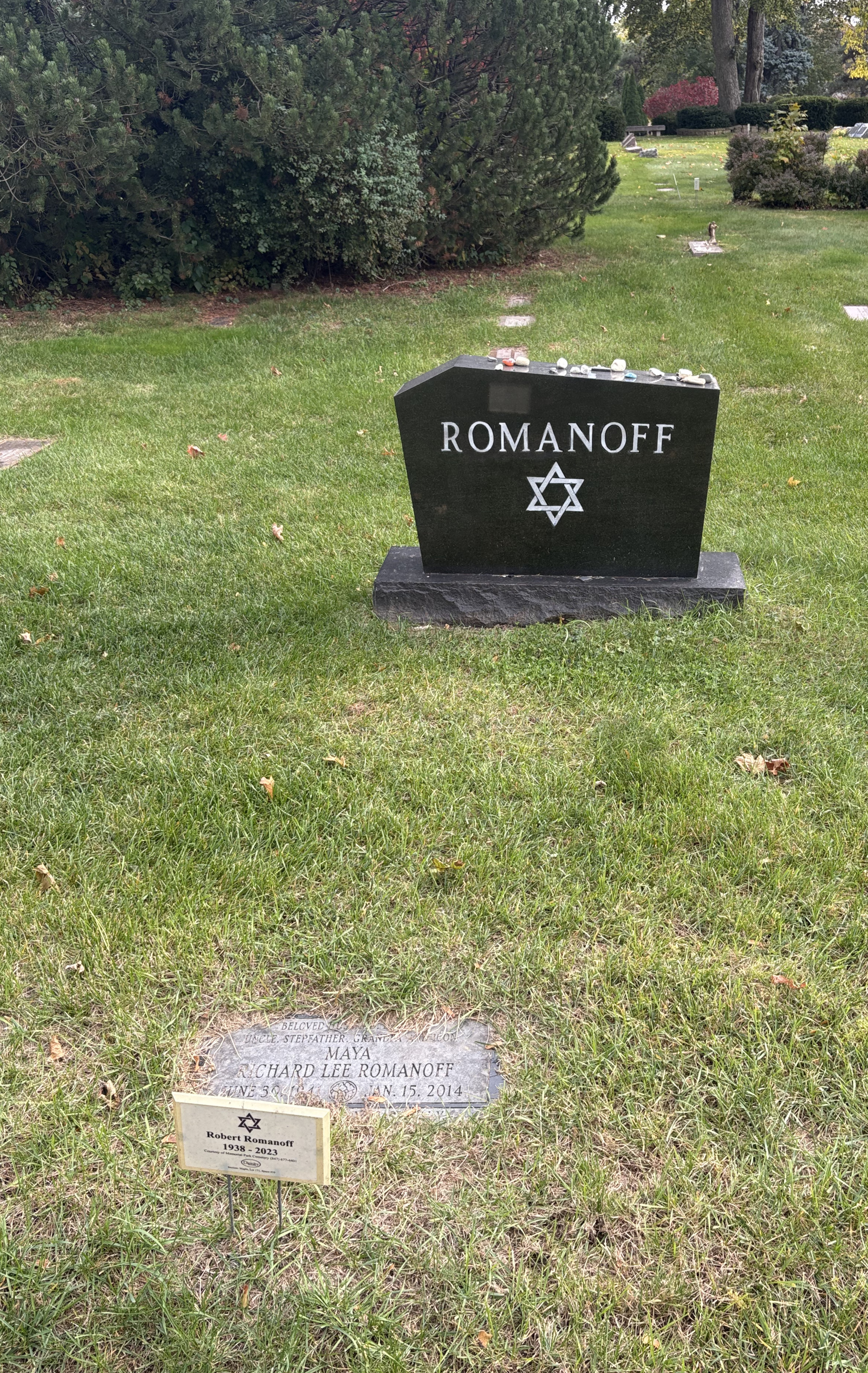
Romanoff's grave at Memorial Park Cemetery

Romanoff grew up in Lincoln Park, Chicago neighborhood. he was a student at the University of California, Berkeley during the 1960s. After graduation, he traveled to North Africa and Paris, where employment at the couture houses spurred his interest in textile design. The influence of Woodstock led to Romanoff producing fabrics that brought the technique of tie-dye into the realm of couture.

The Maya Romanoff Corporation was established in 1969 and now has more than 60 employees. It is based in Skokie, Illinois.

Diagnosed with Parkinson's disease in 1991, Romanoff continued to lead the company in partnership with his wife Joyce and family. He died on January 15, 2014, aged 72, and was buried at Memorial Park Cemetery in Skokie.

== Selected works ==
Some of Romanoff's projects have showcased fabrics as fluid works of art: New York's Museum of Contemporary Arts' 1972 Fabric Vibrations; Bess' Sunrise, the draping of the Chicago Sun-Times building in 120 ft (37 m) long ribbons of vibrant color; and the design of shimmering main stage curtain for The Harris Theater for Music and Dance at Chicago's Millennium Park.

Installations by Romanoff's company include Nobu in Hong Kong, Melbourne and Los Angeles (opened September 2007), the Green Room at the Kodak Theatre for the 2007 Academy Awards, Tiffany & Co, the new Playboy Club in Los Angeles, Boucheron stores, Phantom of the Opera Theater in Los Angeles, special projects for Walt Disney, the palace of the Crown Prince of Dubai, Harrods, American Girl stores, and others.

== Awards ==
Romanoff received awards including the ICON of Industry Scholarship Award, presented in honor of his lifetime achievements in November 2006 by NEWH, Inc., the Hospitality Industry Network. Other awards include House & Garden's Designers' Best, The International Furnishings and Design Association's Trailblazer Award, Hospitality Design's Best of Show in Hong Kong, Las Vegas and Miami, commissions with Dizine for the St. Louis Contemporary Art Museum & Puerto Rican Museum of Modern Art, Metropolitan Home's Top 100 Designs, NEOCON's Best of Show, and the International Contemporary Furniture Fair's Editor's Award.
