= Eric Palante =

Belgian motorcycle rally raid competitor

- Nationality: Belgian
- Born: January 21, 1963; Vaux-sous-Chèvremont, Liège, Belgium
- Died: January 9, 2014 (aged 50) near Chilecito, La Rioja Province, Argentina

Eric Palante (21 January 1963 – 9 January 2014) was a Belgian motorcycle rally raid competitor best known for his multiple entries in the Dakar Rally. He took part in the event eleven times, competing most recently in 2014 as a privateer on a Honda CRF450X in the no-assistance "malle-moto" (now Original by Motul) category; his best overall Dakar finish was 66th, in 2012.

Palante died during the 2014 event on Stage 5, between Chilecito and San Miguel de Tucumán in Argentina. Organisers reported that no distress alert had been received, and a subsequent autopsy in Argentina found he died of intense hyperthermia.

== Early life and career ==
Palante was born in the Liège suburb of Vaux-sous-Chèvremont. Based later in Jeneffe, he trained as a secondary-school teacher before founding an industrial cleaning/facility services business in the Liège.

== Rally raid and Dakar career ==
Palante first contested the Dakar Rally in the early 2000s and returned regularly as a privateer. By 2014, he was taking part for the eleventh time; organisers described him as an experienced entrant who “knew the race very well”. Competing without a support crew in the malle-moto classification, his stated goal in 2014 was to win that category. His best overall finish came in 2012, when he placed 66th among the motorcycle competitors.

== Personal life ==
Palante was married and the father of five children. Outside competition, he ran a facilities/industrial cleaning company in the Liège region.

== Legacy ==
Tributes were paid in Belgium following Palante's death. A public ceremony was held in Liège and his home commune of Donceel observed a minute’s silence at the 30 January 2014 council meeting.
