= Frouwke Laning-Boersema =

Dutch politician

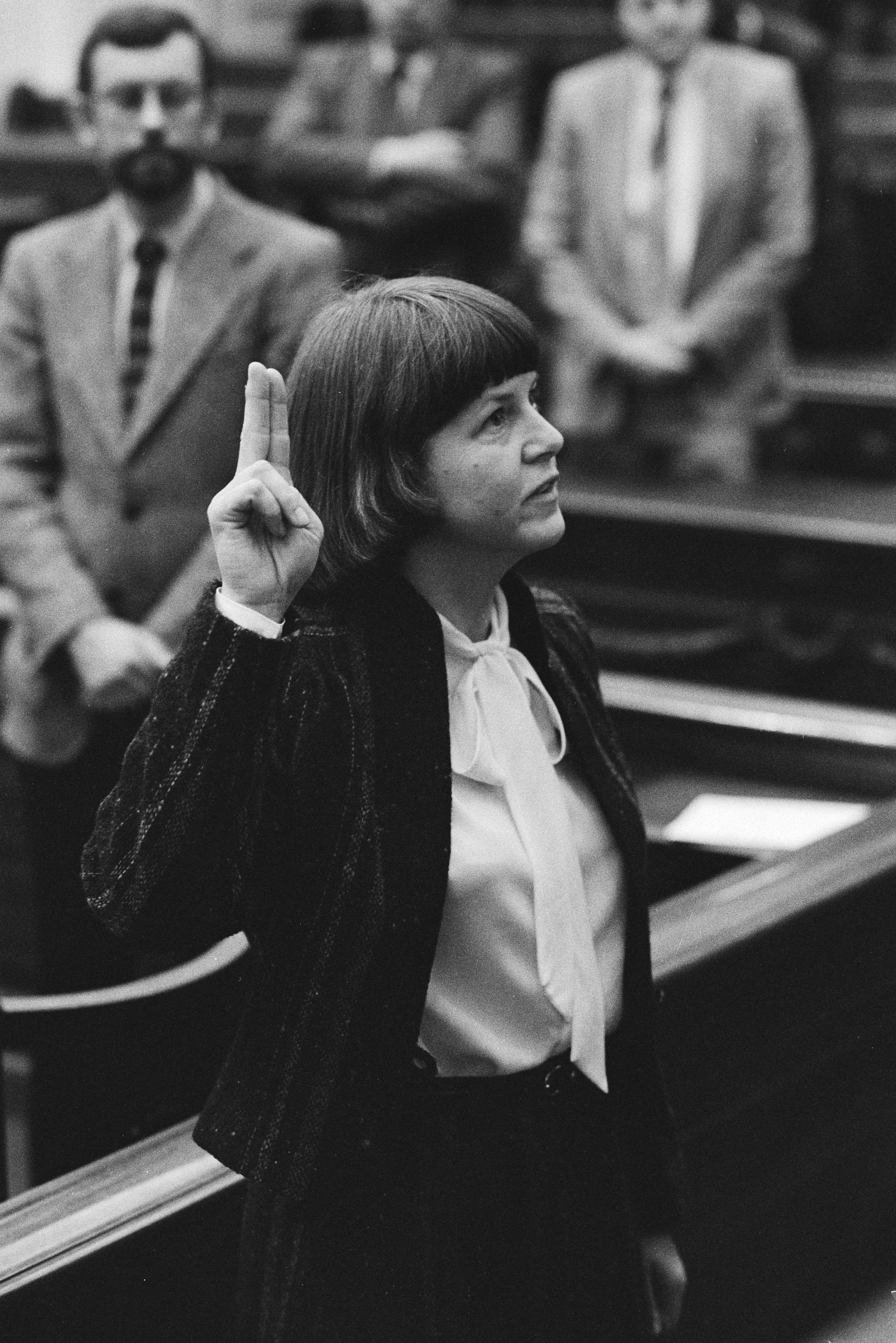
- Laning-Boersema (1983)

Member of the House of Representatives
- In office 16 March 1983 – 17 March 1994
- In office 8 June 1982 – 16 September 1982

Personal details
- Born: 5 July 1937 Groningen, Netherlands
- Died: 10 January 2014 (aged 76) Den Helder, Netherlands
- Party: Christian Democratic Appeal

Frouwke Laning-Boersema (5 July 1937 – 10 January 2014) was a Dutch politician. She was a member of the House of Representatives from 1982 to 1994 for the Christian Democratic Appeal.

== Early life ==
Laning-Boersema was born on 5 July 1937 in Groningen, Netherlands. She studied medicine at the University of Groningen between 1955 and 1960 and specialised as a general practitioner at the same university between 1961 and 1963. Afterwards she started working as a GP on the island of Vlieland, working there for two years. She continued her work as a GP in Den Helder between 1965 and 1983.

== Career ==
Laning-Boersema was a member of the party council for the Christian Democratic Appeal between 1977 and 1982. She was a member of the House of Representatives from 1982 to 1994. Within her party she was the spokesperson for public health. Laning-Boersema was a nuclear pacifist and voted against party lines on the issue of nuclear armament.

== Personal life ==
In 1963, Laning married, adding her spouse's surname, Boersema, to her own. She was made a Knight of the Order of the Netherlands Lion on 28 April 1995.
