= Karl Slym =

Karl Jonathon Slym (9 February 1962 – 26 January 2014) was an English businessman and the managing director of Tata Motors from October 2012 until his death in 2014. Slym was born in Derby, England. Before joining Tata Motors, Slym was the executive vice president of SGMW Motors, China, and president, managing director and board member of General Motors in India between 2007 and 2011. He was an alumnus of Stanford University and a Sloan Fellow.

== Career ==
He studied Production Engineering at the University of Derby and became an early employee of Toyota at its factory at nearby Burnaston, where he rose to be a general assembly manager before moving to General Motors in 1995.

For GM, Slym worked first in the former East Germany as a "lean manufacturing" adviser in the Opel factory at Eisenach in Thuringia — which had previously built the Wartburg saloon, the so-called "Mercedes of the East". From there he transferred to Poland as director of manufacturing at a new Opel plant in Gliwice, and in 1999 he moved again, to Canada, to become manager of a GM plant at Oshawa in Ontario.

After his MS at Stanford University in California in 2002, returned to Canada, then did a stint in South Korea before being appointed in 2007 to be general manager of GM in India, where the US giant had previously achieved only modest market penetration.

Before being headhunted by Tata Motors, Slym spent nine months as executive vice president of SGMW Motors, a GM joint venture building small commercial vehicles at Liuzhou in south western China.

== Personal life ==
Slym, who was originally from Derby, met his future wife, Sally, when he crashed his car at the age of 19 and she handled his insurance claim. Sally Slym née Eames worked in the insurance industry in England, heading the human resources department of the AA's retail insurance division. While living abroad with her husband, she taught business English to foreign executives. They married in September 1984. The couple did not have children and celebrated their 25th wedding anniversary in 2009 by visiting the Indonesian island of Lombok, where Slym, a keen scuba diver, placed a giant concrete heart in a reclaimed coral reef to commemorate the occasion.

Karl Slym was a keen sportsman in his youth — an oarsman, rugby player and goalkeeper — and a lifelong fan of Derby County. He described himself on his Twitter profile as a "Britisher who just can’t stay away from India".

His elder brother Kevin died in 2008.

== Death ==
Slym died on 26 January 2014 in Bangkok, Thailand. He fell from the 22nd floor to the 4th floor of the Shangri-La Hotel in Bangkok where he was to attend a meeting of Tata Motors Thailand.

According to Royal Thai Police Lieutenant-Colonel Somyot Boonyakaew, "he had to make an effort to get through" a "very small window" making it impossible to drop accidentally.

As of March 2014, the investigation continues.
