= Kees IJmkers =

Dutch politician (1924–2014)

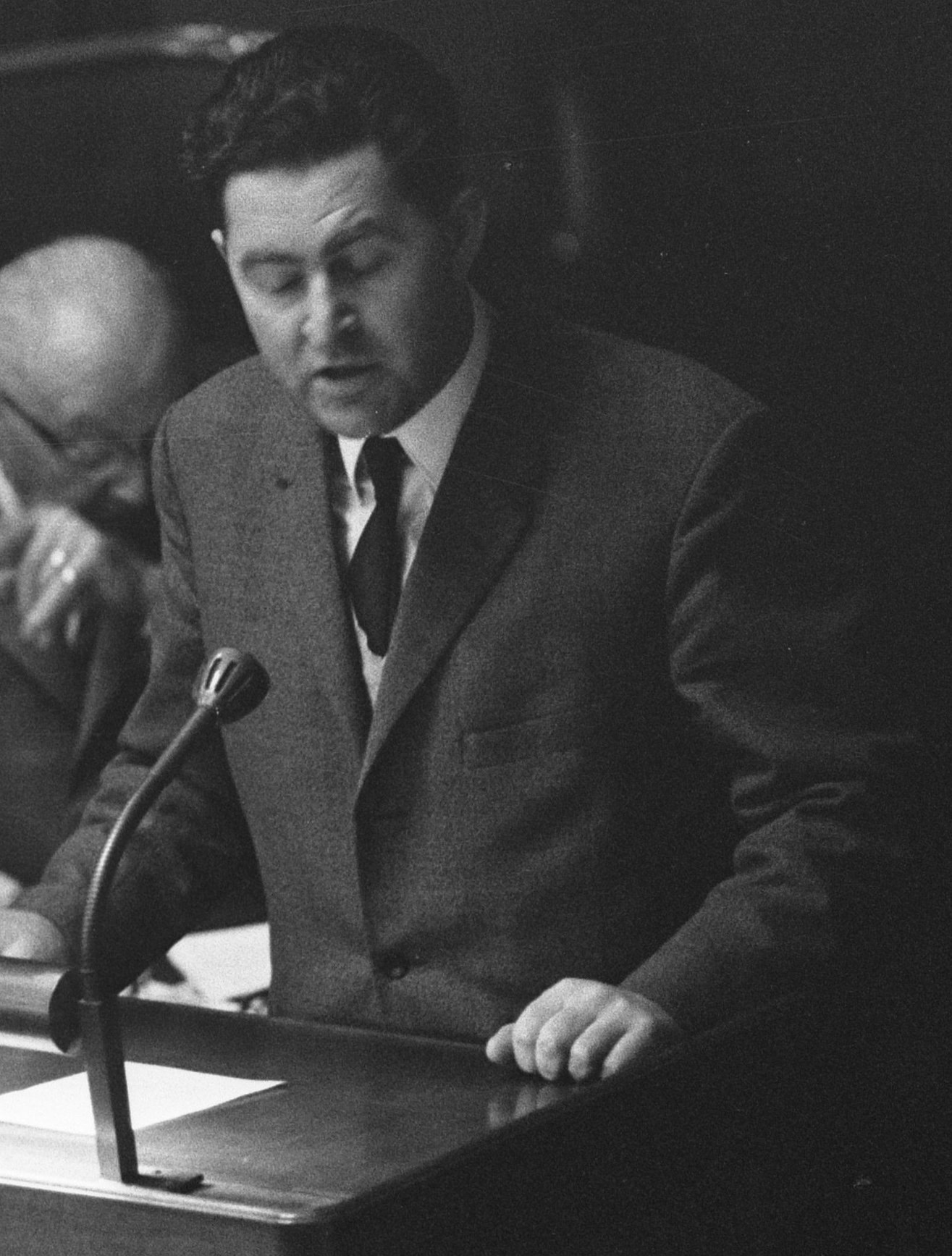
- Kees IJmkers making addressing the Netherlands Senate Chamber, 1966

Member of the Senate
- In office 9 December 1969 – 23 June 1987

Member of the Provincial-Council of South Holland
- In office 13 June 1968 – 3 June 1970

Member of the Senate
- In office 8 February 1966 – 2 March 1967

Member of the Municipal council of The Hague
- In office 14 December 1964 – 5 September 1978

Personal details
- Born: 3 September 1924 The Hague, Netherlands
- Died: 13 January 2014 (aged 89) The Hague, Netherlands
- Party: Communist Party of the Netherlands

Cornelis Antoon (Kees) IJmkers (3 September 1924 – 13 January 2014) was a Dutch politician, he served at different times as a member of the municipal council of The Hague, Senate of the Netherlands, and States-Provincial of South Holland between 1964 and 1987 for the Communist Party of the Netherlands.

Born in The Hague, IJmkers went to the lower technical school in the same city. At the school he specialized as an instrument maker and he would later find a job as a metal worker. In 1964 he was elected to the municipal council of The Hague for the Communist Party of the Netherlands (CPN). Two years later he would also be elected to the Dutch Senate, serving as a member for one year, until 1967. In 1968 he was elected to the States-Provincial of South Holland, he served there for two years. In 1969 he had once again been elected to the Dutch Senate. He was the parliamentary group leader of the CPN from that year until 1987. In 1978 his fourteen-year membership of the municipal council of The Hague ended.

IJmkers was made Officer of the Order of Orange-Nassau.
