= Maciej Dunal =

Polish actor and singer

- Born: 20 December 1953; Poland
- Died: 8 January 2014 (aged 60); Gdynia, Poland
- Occupation(s): Actor, singer
- Years active: 1972–2014

Maciej Dunal (20 December 1953 – 8 January 2014) was a Polish actor and singer.

Maciej Dunal died on 8 January 2014, aged 60, in Gdynia. His funeral was held on 13 January.
