= Jerome Gross =

American biologist

- Born: February 25, 1917; New York City, New York, U.S.
- Died: January 27, 2014 (aged 96); Waban, Massachusetts, U.S.
- Education: Massachusetts Institute of Technology, New York University Grossman School of Medicine
- Known for: Pioneering work in collagen research
- Awards: Ciba Foundation Award for Research Relevant to the Problems of Aging (1959); Lifetime Achievement Award of The Wound Healing Society (1995)
- Scientific career
- Fields: Biology
- Workplaces: Harvard Medical School, Massachusetts General Hospital

Jerome Gross (February 25, 1917 - January 27, 2014) was an American biologist and member of the National Academy of Sciences. His research at Harvard Medical School and the Massachusetts General Hospital in the 1950s helped launch the fields of collagen research.

In 1969, Gross was promoted to Professor of Medicine at Harvard Medical School and named Biologist at the Massachusetts General Hospital. In the preceding decades, scientists from around the world traveled to his Developmental Biology Laboratory in the Department of Medicine at the Massachusetts General Hospital to study his work on collagen structure, wound healing, and limb regeneration.

In 1987, Gross became Professor Emeritus of Medicine at Harvard Medical School. The following year, he became the first Paul Klemperer Award recipient at the New York Academy of Medicine. In 1995 he was awarded the Lifetime Achievement Award by The Wound Healing Society.

Gross spent over 60 years on the faculty of Harvard and in the labs of Mass General Hospital. He died one month shy of his 97th birthday in Waban, Massachusetts, of natural causes.

== Biography ==
Jerome Gross was born in New York City on February 25, 1917. In 1939, he graduated from the Massachusetts Institute of Technology. While his scientific interests included astronomy and biology, he chose a career in medicine. He subsequently attended the New York University College of Medicine. After a year as an intern at Long Island College Hospital, he served two years in the Army Medical Corps.

Gross believed that clues to diseases such as rheumatic fever would be found in the molecular structure and biology of connective tissue. He returned to M.I.T. to join the laboratory of Francis O. Schmitt as a Research Associate, where he began research on structural macromolecules utilizing chemical and electron microscopical methods. Despite many important observations on hyaluronic acid and elastin, he chose to focus on collagen.

He was attracted to Harvard Medical School and the Massachusetts General Hospital by Walter Bauer, who thought that many of the secrets of rheumatoid arthritis and rheumatic fever could be uncovered by similar methods. Gross's pioneering findings that collagen molecules could be extracted from tissues using solutions of neutral salt or dilute acid and reconstituted into various structures opened up the field of collagen research.

Gross then began to study collagen structure in animal models of human wound healing. In the late 1950s, he became interested in lathyrism and, with Charles Levene, made the critical observations that lathyrism resulted from abnormal aggregation and defective cross-linking of collagen molecules. Alongside his collaborators, Karl Piez and George Martin at the National Institute of Health, Gross discovered that collagen was composed of three polypeptide chains. These experiments opened up the field of collagen biology.

In the early 1960s, Gross began searching for mechanisms whereby collagen fibers are degraded during tissue remodeling alongside Belgian postdoctoral fellow Charles Lapiere. Gross reasoned that collagenolytic enzymes, which previously had been identified only in bacteria, could be made only when and where they were needed. They looked for collagenase in the medium from tissue implants in culture. Together, they found the enzyme and characterized its mechanism of action and its unique cleavage site.

With such colleagues as Martin Tanzer, Utaka Nagai, Andrew Kang, and others, Gross continued studies of mechanisms of collagenolysis, lathyrism, and wound healing. In 1969, Gross was promoted to Professor of Medicine at Harvard Medical School and named Biologist at the Massachusetts General Hospital. Scientists from all over the world worked in Gross's Developmental Biology Laboratory in the Department of Medicine at the Massachusetts General Hospital. Gross continued to make important observations on collagen structure, mechanisms of fibrillogenesis, the role of hyaluronic acid and hyaluronidase in wound healing, embryogenesis and limb regeneration, the origin of corneal ulcers, and control of collagenase production.

Gross died at age 96 in Waban, Massachusetts of natural causes

== Recognition ==
From 1953 to 1962, Gross served on the Committee on the Skeletal System for the National Research Council. During that period, from 1956 to 1960, he was appointed Associate Editor of the Journal of Histochemistry and Cytochemistry. In 1956, he was named an Established Investigator for the American Heart Association.

Gross's most longstanding post was at the Helen Hay Whitney Foundation at the Scientific Advisory Committee, where he served from 1956 to 1991.

In 1959, he received the Ciba Foundation Award for Research Relevant to the Problems of Aging. That same year he was appointed to the Advisory Panel on Molecular Biology at the National Science Foundation, where he served until 1962. That year he served as chairman of the Board of Scientific Counselors at the National Institute of Dental Research. He remained in that position until 1966.

In 1963, Gross won the Special Award of the Society of Cosmetic Chemists. That same year he was named Advisory Editor for the Journal of Cosmetic Chemists, where he remained until 1971. From 1965 to 1968 he was Consulting Editor at Developmental Biology.

In 1966, he was elected to fellowship in the American Academy of Arts and Sciences. Eight years later he was elected to membership in the National Academy of Sciences.

Gross served on the editorial board of the Journal of Biological Chemistry from 1976 to 1981 and Chairman of the Committee on Research, MGH, from 1979 to 1982. He joined the Board of Trustees of the Helen Hay Whitney Foundation in 1985. The following year he was elected to membership at the Institute of Medicine.

In 1987, he became Professor Emeritus of Medicine at Harvard Medical School. One year later he was the first Paul Klemperer Award recipient at the New York Academy of Medicine. In 1995, Gross won the Lifetime Achievement Award of The Wound Healing Society.
