= Pedro Mayorga =

Argentine equestrian

Pedro Oscar Mayorga (1921 – 6 January 2014) was an Argentine equestrian who competed in the 1956 Summer Olympics in Stockholm, Sweden. In 1947, he met rider Elena Argañaraz on the circuit and they married eight months later. They competed at FEI events in Europe and America throughout the 1950s. They had five children, three of whom – Eduardo, Juan Francisco, and Pablo Mayorga – are involved in equestrian sport.
