= Michael Tshele =

- Born: c. 1950
- Died: 13 January 2014 (age 64); Mothutlung, South Africa
- Cause of death: Shot by police
- Other name: Bra Mike or Shadow
- Occupation: Journalist
- Years active: 1976–2014

Michael Tshele, also known as Bra Mike and Shadow (c. 1950 – 13 January 2014), was a South African freelance photographer and community activist who was known for his contributions to the online newspaper Kormorant and Leseding News. Tshele was killed along with three others while reporting on a protest over water in Mothutlung near Brits, North West province, South Africa, during the post-apartheid era.

== Personal ==
Tshele never married or had children. He lived with his mother and the two survived off of her pension. He was described as shy, yet friendly among his community. He attended his local Dutch Reformed Church, was an active member of the Christian Democratic Party (UCDP) and led the Matebele Burial Society.

== Career ==
Tshele was a well known member of his community. He was a freelance photographer-journalist who worked for Kormorant newspaper and Leseding news as well as a community activist. In addition to being a photo-journalist he would photograph parties, weddings, and graduations.

== Death ==
Mothutlung, near Brits, is located in South Africa and shown relative to the largest city Johannesburg.

The following protesters were killed: Mike Tshele, Osia Rahube, Lerato Seema and Enock Seimela.

Tshele was the first of the four to be shot at a water supply protest on 13 January 2014 in Mothutlung, South Africa. Hyde Mophoso, a police officer, opened fire using banned SSG ammunition on the crowd of protesters, where Tshele was photographing broken water pipes. Tshele was not armed and according to a fellow, surviving protester, "the only threat he posed was that his camera was recording evidence of what the police were doing." He was insulted and assaulted by police who confiscated his cellphone and camera, deleting the pictures. Trial accounts suggest that Tschele's hands were raised high when the officer shot him. He died from injuries a few days later.

Warrant Officer Mophosho was convicted two years later for three of the murders and for two other attempted murders.

== Context ==
Tshele was killed after the apartheid era, which was a period of racial segregation in South Africa. During the time of the water supply protest where Tshele was killed, three local water pumps were broken down. Hundreds of angry citizens gathered around the pumps to protest the issue, where it soon turned violent when police fired on the protesters.

== Impact ==
Although shy, Tshele was an active member of his community and led several organizations, including the Matabele Burial Society, his local United Christian Democratic Party and his local Moroka Swallows fan club. He was a survivor of the abuse of the apartheid era.

== Reactions ==
Tshele's death, along the three others, was a "'symptom' of increasing police brutality and growing attacks on the right to protest," according to the Right2Know campaign.

On the day he was buried at a local cemetery hundreds of residents, many who were also at the protest, were present. As he was being buried they broke out into song and dance to pay their respects.

== See also ==
- Political repression in post-apartheid South Africa
