= Miguel Romero (activist) =

Spanish activist and politician

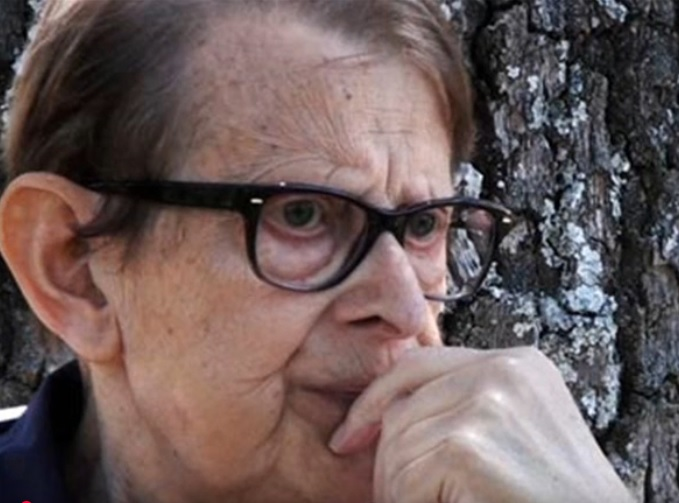
Miguel Romero Baeza

Miguel Romero (Melilla, 1945 — Madrid, January 26, 2014) was a Spanish activist and politician.

Romero died in Madrid from cancer.
