= Dinesh Medh =

Indian cricketer (1928–2014)

Personal information
- Born: 1928
- Died: 27 January 2014 (aged 85–86); Vadodara, India
- Source: ESPNcricinfo, 17 May 2016

Dinesh Medh (1928 – 27 January 2014) was an Indian cricketer. He played first-class cricket for Gujarat and Mysore between 1946 and 1963.
