= Mahalingum Govender =

South African cricketer (1946–2014)

Personal information
- Born: 1946
- Died: 27 January 2014 (aged 67–68); Stanger, South Africa
- Source: ESPNcricinfo, 17 May 2016

Mahalingum Govender (1946 – 27 January 2014) was a South African cricketer. He played 27 first-class matches for Natal between 1971 and 1984.
