= Hector Munro (cricketer) =

English cricketer

Personal information
- Born: 24 October 1920; Calcutta, India
- Died: 6 January 2014 (aged 93); Tunbridge Wells, Kent, England
- Source: ESPNcricinfo, 17 May 2016

Hector Munro (24 October 1920 – 6 January 2014) was an English cricketer. He played one first-class match for Oxford University Cricket Club in 1947.

== See also ==
- List of Oxford University Cricket Club players
