= Bill Boivin =

Canadian football player (1914–2014)

Profile
- Position: Halfback

Personal information
- Born: October 21, 1914; Saint Boniface, Manitoba, Canada
- Died: January 28, 2014 (aged 99); Vancouver, British Columbia, Canada
- Listed weight: 175 lb (79 kg)

Career history
- 1938–1941: Winnipeg Blue Bombers

Awards and highlights
- 2× Grey Cup champion (1939, 1941)

William Elric Boivin (October 21, 1914 – January 28, 2014) was a Canadian professional football player who played for the Winnipeg Blue Bombers. He won the Grey Cup with them in 1939 and 1941. He was also a director of the BC Lions and general manager of the Blue Bombers (1955–1957).
