= Josef Lammerz =

German musician

Josef Lammerz (15 June 1930 – 8 January 2014) was a German composer, choral director and organist.

== Life and career ==
Josef Lammerz began piano lessons at an early age. He was tutored by Hubert Brings, longtime organist at Bonn Cathedral. From 1950-1954 he studied sacred music at the Robert Schumann Hochschule, and later further organ studies with Rudolf Petzold at Cologne Cathedral and Clement Ingenhoven in Düsseldorf.

From 1956 until 1975 he became the organist and Choirmaster at Christ-Koenig-Kirche in Duisburg where he developed a very highly regarded choir, performing major choral works, as well as his own compositions. He participated in the municipal concerts with the Duisburg Symphony Orchestra at the Mercator-Halle, with works such as Fauré's Requiem, Verdi's Stabat mater, and Liszt's Christus.

In 1961 to 1975, he took posts as lecturer in professional piano and organ studies at the Niederrheinischen Musikschule in Duisburg, and music theory at the Folkwang Hochschule Essen (Duisburg institute).

In 1975 he moved back to Bonn Cathedral to become the organist and choirmaster.

Since his retirement in 1989, he has spent long periods in Teulada on the Costa Blanca, Spain, and continues to compose. A cantata about the great medieval history of Teulada and his outstanding service to the musical life of the city, he was made an honoured citizen, and a street in nearby Xàtiva has been named after him.

== Compositions ==
Date	Work	First performed
1951	Weihnachtslied, Chor u.Orgel	Duisburg
1954; 1988; 1996	Te Deum, Soli, Chor; Orchester, Orgel	
1955	Motetten, Chor a capella	Duisburg
1957	Missa festiva, Chor u.Orgel	Duisburg
1962/3	Messe in A, Soli; Chor; Bläser u.Orgel	Duisburg/Bonn
1980	Missa mundi, Schola, Chor, Bläser und Orgel	Bonn
1990	Missa solemnis, Tenor, Chor, Orchester	Spain/Bonn
1990	Missa brevis, Sopran, Chor a capella	
1993	Te Deum, Sopran, Chor, Instrumente, Pauken, Orgel	Spain
1994	Psalm 13o, Sopran, Chor und Orgel	Aachen/Spain
1994/5	Cantata a Xativa, Sprecher, Bariton, Chor u. Orchester	Spain
1996	Missa de Campana, Sopran, Chor u.Orgel,	Bonn
1996/7	Weihnachtslieder Sopran und Orgel;	Spain
1997	Cantata Lirica, Sprecher, Tenor, Chor u. Orchester	
1999	Cantico de las criaturas, Soli, Chor, Orchester, Orgel	Würzburg, 2013, Monteverdichor Würzburg
1999	Fuente de Vida, Sopran, Chor, Orgel	Spain
2001	Weihnachtslieder, Sopran u.Orgel	Spain
2001	5 Lieder nach Texten v.H.Hesse, Bariton u. Klavier	
2002	Symphonische Motette "Epephania", Sopran, Chor, Orchester	Cologne
2003	Vier Marienmotetten, Chor u. Orgel	
2005	Missa Romantica, Sopran, 8 St. Doppelchor, Orgel	Spain
1998	Concertino f. Klavier u. Instrumente (Orgel)	
