= Pete Titanic =

Canadian football player

Profile
- Position: End

Personal information
- Born: August 13, 1920
- Died: January 20, 2014 (aged 93); Newmarket, Ontario, Canada
- Listed height: 5 ft 11 in (1.80 m)
- Listed weight: 170 lb (77 kg)

Career history
- 1946–1950: Toronto Argonauts

Awards and highlights
- Grey Cup champion (1946, 1947, 1950)

Peter David Titanic (August 13, 1920 – January 20, 2014) was a Canadian professional football player who played for the Toronto Argonauts. He won the Grey Cup with them in 1946, 1947 and 1950. He previously played for the Toronto Balmy Beach Beachers. After his football career he worked for Leon's Furniture, retiring in 1988. He lived in Markham, Ontario in his later years, where he died in January 2014 of Alzheimer's disease.
