= Dominic A. Infante =

Dominic A. Infante (February 23, 1940 – January 12, 2014) was a communication scholar, professor, and author. In addition to shorter teaching terms at other universities, he served as a professor in The School of Communication Studies at Kent State University for 19 years. Widely known for his research on communication theory and verbal aggressiveness, he was revered as a prolific scholar in the field of communication studies and made a great impact on many of his students and colleagues.

== Personal life and education ==
On February 23, 1940, in Youngstown, Ohio, Dominic was born to Joseph J. and Maline Infante. Infante earned his undergraduate degree in 1962 from Bowling Green State University. As a BGSU student, he involved himself on campus as a player on the Falcon football team, a member of the Falcon Forensics & Debate Team, and brother of the Zeta Lambda chapter of Tau Kappa Epsilon fraternity. He later went on to gain his master's of arts and Ph.D. from Kent State University, where he was the doctoral program's first-ever graduate.

While in his twenties, Infante studied and trained with Grace Straw Wilson of Youngstown and Bryce Fogle of New York City in voice as an operatic tenor singer. Besides singing, Infante also enjoyed partaking in traveling, sports, fishing, boating, and competitive shooting with the North-South Skirmish Association.

Infante died on January 12, 2014, at Aultman Hospital in Canton, Ohio at the age of 73 after battling an illness.

== Teaching career ==
Choosing to pursue a career in higher education after his brief experience in the singing world, Infante earned his first teaching job at Austintown Fitch High School. There he served as an English teacher and Forensics Coach. He later went on to serve on faculty at the City University of New York at Queens College, the University of South Florida, and the State University of New York at Albany in their communication studies departments.

His most notable and longest-held faculty position was at Kent State University. In 1976, he signed on as an associate professor of Communication Studies and later earned Professor Emeritus status when he retired in 1995. During his time at Kent State, he was heavily involved in teaching and research. He taught courses in multiple areas of communication studies such as public speaking, communication theory, persuasion, research methods, and statistics, in addition to directing dissertations and theses.

== Research ==
Throughout his career, Infante published multiple books and journal articles, ranking him as a leading scholar in communication during the 20th century. He is best known for researching topics that addressed issues in society such as domestic violence, conflict management through argument, and corporal punishment. Dominic Infante authored three books before his death: Arguing Constructively in 1987, Building Communication Theory in 1990, and Contemporary Communication Theory in 2009 with Theodore A. Avtgis, Andrew S. Rancer, and Erica L. MacGeorge.

Most notably, he defined and developed a theory of argumentativeness and verbal aggressiveness that continues to be used by communication scholars today. In 1982, Infante and Rancer developed a self-reporting 20-item Argumentativeness Scale to measure trait argumentativeness to identify people who have high, moderate, and low motivation to argue. This scale contains two dimensions that measure a motivational tendency to avoid arguments and a tendency to approach them. Similarly, the self-reporting 20-item Verbal Aggressiveness Scale developed with Charles J. Wigley III in 1986, identifies those that are high, moderate, or low in preposition to verbally attack others and was used to determine if verbal aggressiveness and argumentativeness came from different dimensions of one's personality. Using this interest in verbal aggressiveness, he went on to study interspousal violence. In 1989, he, along with Teresa A. Chandler and Jill E. Rudd, published "Test of an Argumentative Skill Deficiency Model of Interspousal Violence" in Communication Monographs. This study suggested that spouses in violent marriages were less willing to argue and present and defend positions on controversial issues than those in non-violent marriages, but exhibited greater verbal aggressiveness. In 2000, he further explored familial relationships with "Corporal Punishment and Communication in Father-Son Dyads" to study how verbal and physical aggressiveness tactics to gain compliance affect the credibility and overall father-son relationship. Supporting similar evidence found in the 1989 study, Infante, Jeffrey W. Kassing, and Kevin J. Pearce found that the use of physical aggression and corporal punishment by a father does not exhibit constructive communication and places the child in both physical and psychological harm.

== Honors and awards ==
Due to his work in research and dedication at Kent State University, Infante was a recipient of multiple honors and awards in the communication study discipline. In 1989, he received the Daniel Rohrer Research in Argumentation Award by the American Forensic Association for his study with Chandler and Rudd, "Test of an Argumentative Skill Deficiency Model of Interspousal Violence". As an association that recognizes achievement in argumentation and public advocacy, this award recognized their work as an outstanding study in the research concerns of the Association. In 1992, his production of research in organizational communication ranked him 1st in the nation. One year later in 1993, he was ranked 6th in the nation by a Communication Education study in research productivity among all communication scholars since the beginning of communication study.

In October 2012, he was presented with two important honors by the School of Communication Studies at Kent State during their Homecoming Awards Celebration. His first honor was receiving the Centennial Award, an award established with the university's 2010 Centennial. This award recognized him for his national recognitions to the academic field of communication and the school and is the highest honor awarded by the School of Communication Studies. He was also presented with the establishment of The Dominic A. Infante Communication Scholarship. Created in conjunction with his family and friends, in addition to his students and fellow faculty members, this scholarship is awarded to a student for their 2nd year in the Master of Arts Program in the School of Communication Studies at Kent State University. The student that is awarded this scholarship is determined by the graduate faculty as being on schedule for completing their degree and one who appears to be a good prospect for continuing into the doctorate program.
