= David Cairns (cricketer) =

English cricketer

Personal information
- Full name: John David Cairns
- Born: 10 February 1925; Gibraltar
- Died: 25 January 2014 (aged 88); Canada
- Source: Cricinfo, 17 May 2016

John David Cairns (10 February 1925 – 25 January 2014) was an English cricketer. He played seven first-class matches for Oxford University Cricket Club between 1946 and 1949. After becoming a doctor he spent most of the rest of his life in Canada. He and his wife Mary had two daughters.

== See also ==
- List of Oxford University Cricket Club players
