= Armando Rodríguez González =

Cuban musician (1889–1965)

Armando Rodriguez Gonzalez
- Born: 23 April 1889; Miraflores, Boyeros, Havana, Cuba
- Died: 1965 (aged 75–76); Havana, Cuba

Jorge Gustavo Armando Rodríguez González (23 April 1889 – 1965) was a Cuban composer and musician. Rodriguez Gonzalez played numerous musical instruments and played in various bands and orchestras during his long career. He also composed many pieces of music, such as Aurora and Por Que Te Fuiste.

He was the son of Jose de Jesus Rodriguez Ferrer and Maria Andrea Gonzalez Ramos. His uncle, Antonio Rodriguez Ferrer, was the composer of the musical introductory notes to the Cuban national anthem. On July 4, 1913, he married Isolina Caridad Fontanills de Ugarte, one of the first women to have graduated from a Cuban school in nursing. They had two daughters, Maria del Carmen and Lucia Josefina Rodriguez Fontanills, in additioned he raised his orphaned niece, Amelia Rogelia Penichet Rodriguez. His grandson Clemente G. Gomez Rodriguez is a writer and attorney.

His family at one point owed what is now known as Reparto de Miraflores Viejo (neighborhood of Old Miraflores) and he lived his entire life at Calle Primera #40, esquina J, in Miraflores (original house torn down in 1950s). He died of cancer in 1965.
