= Krzysztof Birula-Białynicki =

Polish ice hockey player

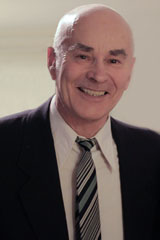
- Birula-Białynicki in 2012
- Born: 15 August 1944 Vilnius, Lithuanian SSR, Soviet Union
- Died: 30 January 2014 (aged 69)
- Position: Forward
- National team: Poland
- NHL draft: Undrafted
- Playing career: 1961–1973

Krzysztof Birula-Białynicki (15 August 1944 – 30 January 2014) was a Polish ice hockey player. He competed at the 1972 Winter Olympics.

== See also ==
- Ice hockey at the 1972 Winter Olympics
