= John Kabaireho =

Ugandan politician

John Kabaireho (1923 or 1924 – January 22, 2014) was a Ugandan politician. He was the prime minister of dependent Ankole Kingdom from 1960 to 1963. In 1963 he was replaced by James Kahigiriza. He was a resident of Bwoma in Ryeishe sub-county, Igara county in Bushenyi district.

== Education ==
He attended Makerere College in 1945 where he completed his teacher training certificate education in 1947.

== Career ==
He taught at St. Peter's Nsambya, St. Mary's Junior secondary school Rushoroza in Kabale, St. Joseph's Junior secondary school Nyamitanga and in 1951, he was posted to Ibanda Vernacular Teacher Training College as a tutor.

He was the first catholic prime minister of Ankole kingdom in 1960. This office was held by Nuwa Mbaguta, Lazario Kamungungunu and Zekena Mungonya. In 1963, he was replaced by James Kahigiriza who was the last "Engazi" before the kingdom was abolished. He was part of the delegation who attended the Uganda Self-Governance Conference at Lancaster House in London in 1960 as well as the Independence Conference in Marlborough House in London in 1961 that negotiated Uganda's independence. After the fall of Obote II's government, Kabaireho was a commissioner general of the western region during the regime of Yusuf Lule that lasted 68 months. He was a member of Democratic Party(DP), meanwhile the Democratic Party chairman in Bushenyi. He also served in the ministry of education, East African Posts and Telecommunications in Kenya and later appointed manager of Uganda posts and telecommunications.

== Death ==
He died in Kampala after losing battle with Prostate cancer and stroke at the age of 91

== See also ==
- Joseph Kabuleta
- Apollo Kaggwa
- Robert Mugabe Kakyebezi
- John F. Mugisha
