= János Kristófi =

Romanian painter (1925–2014)

- Born: 15 December 1925; Bihor County, Romania
- Died: 5 January 2014 (aged 88); Oradea, Romania
- Occupation: Painter
- Years active: 1955–88

János Kristófi (15 December 1925 – 5 January 2014) was a Romanian painter.

János Kristófi was born into an ethnic Hungarian. He graduated from high school in Cluj-Napoca, graduated from the Ion Andreescu Academy of Fine Arts (1954). He was a teacher at the Folk Art School until his retirement in Oradea (1955–88). With his wife, Judit Hoványi's first joint exhibition with a sculptor-ceramic artist (1958), he was active in the artistic life of the city. His landscapes captured Oradea. Prepared by Béla Bartók, composer Sándor Bihari of Nagyvárad and Nicolae Jiga, known as the patron of public education. He had a "family exhibition" with his wife in Vienna and Leiden (1988), in Miskolc (1990), in Győr, Budapest (1991). and Szolnok (1995).

János Kristófi, a world-famous painter living in Oradea, celebrated his 88th birthday on December 15, 2013. He had been living in the city since 1954, where he taught generations for thirty years in the City of Art and then in the Folk High School. He had ten children there. Each of them was brought to life by the Catholic faith, and took on professions such as painting, singing, photography, playing the organ, law, engineering and medicine. "He became a true painter of Oradea, the successor and contemporary of the classical castles of the castle (Móric Baráth, István Balogh, Ernő Tibor, Leon Alex, Román Mottl, Gábor Miklóssy, Mihály Tompa, etc.). Zoltán Banner is an art historian living in Békéscsaba. [3]

János Kristófi died on 5 January 2014 at the age of 88 and was buried on 8 January 2014 at 3 pm in Oradea, the Steinberger Chapel of the city Rulikowsky Cemetery.

Awards, awards 2011 - Knight's Cross of the Order of the Republic of Hungary (civilian section) .
