= Alexandros Petersen =

American academic

Alexandros Petersen (1984 - 2014), known as Alexi or Alex, was an academic, writer and geopolitical energy expert. He is the author, among others, of the book "The World Island: Eurasian Geopolitics and The Fate of the West" (Praeger: 2011).

Born in Philadelphia, Pennsylvania on September 3, 1984 to a Danish father and a Greek mother, Petersen spoke Danish, Greek and English. He grew up in Rome and Washington DC, where he graduated from Georgetown Day School.

In 1999, Petersen co-founded the punk rock band "The A.K.s", together with Noah Foster and Justin Parker while they were classmates at GDS in Washington. Petersen was the lead singer and main lyricist of the band.

Petersen received a BA in War Studies with First Class Honors from King's College London and an MSc and PhD in International Relations from the London School of Economics. His PhD thesis, dated 2012, which was entitled Integration in energy and transport amongst Azerbaijan, Georgia and Turkey, was also published posthumously in 2016 with a foreword by Roy Allison. An anthology of Petersen's articles, short studies, and interviews was published in 2017. In the foreword, S. Frederick Starr noted that, although these pieces had been written over the span of ten years, starting in 2004, "they are even more relevant today in their prescient analysis. Petersen insightfully addressed the implications of the West withdrawing its engagement from the Caucasus and Central Asia, the expansion of the Chinese influence, and Russia’s strategic interests".

His book Sinostan: China's Inadvertent Empire, co-authored with Raffaello Pantucci, was published in April 2022.

Petersen was actively involved with Young Professionals in Foreign Policy as both a member and a Board representative. He helped found branches in London, Brussels, and New York City.

He died January 17, 2014, in a Kabul restaurant bombing and shooting rampage that killed a total of 21 people.

== Selected publications ==
- Pantucci, Raffaello, and Alexandros Petersen. "Sinostan: China's Inadvertent Empire." Oxford University Press, 2022.
- Petersen, Alexandros. "Eurasia's Shifting Geopolitical Tectonic Plates: Global Perspective, Local Theaters." Lexington Books, 2017.
- Petersen, Alexandros. "Integration in Energy and Transport: Azerbaijan, Georgia, and Turkey." Lexington Books, 2016.
- Petersen, Alexandros. "The World Island: Eurasian geopolitics and the fate of the West." Praeger, 2011.
