= Frank Cockett =

British surgeon

- Born: 22 April 1916; Rockhampton, Australia
- Died: 17 January 2014 (aged 97)
- Scientific career
- Fields: Surgery
- Workplaces: St Thomas' Hospital, King Edward VII's Hospital for Officers

Frank Bernard Cockett FRCS (22 April 1916 – 17 January 2014) was a senior British surgeon, author and art historian.

== Biography ==
Born on 22 April 1916 in Rockhampton, Australia, Cockett was educated at Bedford School and at St Thomas's Hospital Medical School. During the Second World War he served on Malta as an RAF Surgical Specialist with the rank of squadron leader. Elected as a Fellow of the Royal College of Surgeons in 1947, Cockett was surgical registrar at St Thomas' Hospital between 1947 and 1948, resident assistant surgeon at St Thomas' Hospital between 1948 and 1950, senior lecturer in surgery at St Thomas' Hospital between 1950 and 1954, Consultant at St Thomas' Hospital between 1954 and 1981, and Consultant at King Edward VII's Hospital for Officers between 1974 and 1981.

Cockett made major contributions in the field of vascular surgery, to the extent that one of the main operations for varicose veins was named after him. He also became an authority on early English marine artists. His publications included The Pathology and Surgery of the Veins of the Lower Limb (1956), The War Diary of St Thomas' Hospital 1939–1945 (1991), The Maltese Penguin (1990), Early Sea Painters (1995), and Peter Monamy (2000).

Frank Cockett died on 17 January 2014.
