= Hal Newton =

Canadian football player

Profile
- Position: End

Personal information
- Born: September 14, 1933
- Died: January 2, 2014 (aged 80); Windsor, Ontario
- Listed height: 6 ft 2 in (1.88 m)
- Listed weight: 205 lb (93 kg)

Career history
- 1957: Hamilton Tiger-Cats
- 1958–1959: Calgary Stampeders
- 1959: Toronto Argonauts

Awards and highlights
- Grey Cup champion (1957)

Harold Newton (September 14, 1933 – January 2, 2014) was a Canadian professional football player who played for the Hamilton Tiger-Cats, Calgary Stampeders and Toronto Argonauts. He won the Grey Cup with Hamilton in 1957. He died at the age of 80 in 2014.
