= Lance E. Davis =

American professor of social science (1928–2014)

- Born: November 3, 1928; Seattle, Washington, US
- Died: January 20, 2014 (aged 85)

Academic background
- Education: Johns Hopkins University

Lance Edwin Davis (November 3, 1928 – January 20, 2014) was the Mary Stillman Harkness Professor of Social Science at the California Institute of Technology. He researched the economic history of financial markets and institutional and technological change. His work has been recognised by The Cliometric Society via their awarding him a Clio Can in recognition his of exceptional support of cliometrics.

Davis was also a research associate at the National Bureau of Economic Research. He earned a PhD from Johns Hopkins University in 1956 with thesis titled United States Financial Intermediaries in the Early 19th Century: Four Case Studies.

== Selected publications ==
- Davis, Lance E. with Douglass North (1971) Institutional Change and American Economic Growth, Cambridge University Press.
- Davis, Lance E. with Robert Huttenback (1986) Mammon and the Pursuit of Empire: The Political Economy of British Imperialism (revised and abridged edition, 1988), Cambridge University Press.
- Davis, Lance E. with Robert Cull (1994) International Capital Markets and American Economic Growth, 1820–1914, Cambridge University Press.
- Davis, Lance E. with Robert Gallman (2001) Evolving Financial Markets and International Capital Flows: Britain, the Americas, and Australia, 1870–1914, Cambridge University Press.
