= Yenigün =

- Location within Azerbaijan
- Coordinates: 41°06′N 45°28′E
- Country: Azerbaijan
- Rayon: Agstafa
- Municipality: Xətai
- Elevation: 345 m (1,132 ft)

Population (2009)
  - Total: 1,951
- Time zone: UTC+4 (AZT)
  - Summer (DST): UTC+5 (AZT)

Yenigün (also, Yenigyun) is a village in the Agstafa Rayon of Azerbaijan. The village forms part of the municipality of Xətai.
