= Tsunetoshi Tanaka =

Japanese politician

- 田中 恒利

Member of the House of Representatives
- In office 22 June 1980 – 27 September 1996
- Preceded by: Mamoru Nishida
- Succeeded by: Constituency abolished
- Constituency: Ehime 3rd
- In office 27 December 1969 – 13 November 1972
- Preceded by: Kigen Abe
- Succeeded by: Kigen Abe
- Constituency: Ehime 3rd

Personal details
- Born: 1 April 1925 Higashiuwa, Ehime, Japan
- Died: 12 January 2014 (aged 88)
- Party: Socialist
- Other political affiliations: SDP (1996)
- Education: Nihon University

Tsunetoshi Tanaka (田中 恒利, Tanaka Tsunetoshi; April 1, 1925 - January 12, 2014) was a Japanese politician. He was a member of the House of Representatives (1969–1972, 1980–1996).
