= Kenneth Saggers =

South African cricketer (1936–2014)

Personal information
- Born: 4 July 1936; Pretoria, South Africa
- Died: 31 January 2014 (aged 77); Johannesburg, South Africa
- Source: ESPNcricinfo, 16 May 2016

Kenneth Saggers (4 July 1936 – 31 January 2014) was a South African cricketer. He played first-class cricket for Griqualand West, Northerns and Orange Free State between 1958 and 1971.
