= Joel L. Shin =

Joel L. Shin (died January 21, 2014) was a specialist in international trade matters, government affairs and national defense. He was a partner at Evenflow Macro, which he cofounded in 2013. He had previously been a principal of The Scowcroft Group and a senior fellow with The Forum for International Policy. Shin served on the policy staff of the presidential campaign of Governor George W. Bush, assisting in the development of foreign and defense policies. Shin also worked for the Bush-Cheney transition. He was also an associate in the corporate department of Whitman Breed, Abbott & Morgan, a New York law firm, where his focus included mergers and acquisitions in the defense and high-tech industries.

Shin received his undergraduate, law, and Master of Public Policy degrees from Harvard University. For his 1990 undergraduate graduation he delivered the Latin oration at the combined undergraduate and graduate commencement. Shin also received a Master of Philosophy degree from the University of Oxford, where he was a Rhodes Scholar.

Shin suffered a heart attack and died at his home in Arlington, Virginia on January 21, 2014.
