= Bob DePratu =

American politician (1939–2014)

Robert Lloyd DePratu (July 21, 1939 – January 31, 2014), was an American politician. DePratu served in the Montana State Senate from 1995 to 2004, representing Whitefish, Montana. He was a member and chairman of the Senate Taxation Committee. He was born in Eureka, Montana and died at a hospital in Whitefish, Montana after a long illness in 2014.
