= Stanley Uys =

South African journalist

- Born: Stanley Huette Uys; 27 April 1922; Coalbrook, Holly Country, Free State, Union of South Africa (present-day South Africa)
- Died: 11 January 2014 (aged 91); London, England, UK
- Other names: Stan Uys
- Occupation: Journalist
- Years active: 1941–2014
- Spouse: Edna Raymond Uys (19??-her death);

Stanley Huette "Stan" Uys (27 April 1922 – 11 January 2014) was a South African journalist.

== Biography ==
Uys was one of four siblings born to Afrikaner parents, Dirk and Francina Le Rey Uys, staunch Calvinists members of the Dutch Reformed Church. He attended Athlone High School, Johannesburg becoming interested in journalism as a teenager. He worked in that field from 1941 until shortly before his own death in 2014.

== Career ==
He was a stringer for the News Chronicle in the 1950s and wrote extensively for newspapers in India, New Zealand and Ireland. Later he was political editor of the Johannesburg Sunday Times and a regular contributor to publications in Britain, Australia, and New Zealand.

James Sanders in his book South Africa and the International Media 1972-1979 described Uys as "somewhat of a legend among journalists in South Africa." Uys interviewed ANC president Oliver Tambo in exile in 1983. He interviewed Nelson Mandela several times, once interviewing Mandela in a secret flat in Johannesburg while Mandela was in hiding from the government. He upset fellow Afrikaners by signing a Ghanaian anti-apartheid declaration.

Uys moved to London in the 1990s to run the office of South Africa's Morning Group chain, while continuing to write for the Rand Daily Mail and other media. Living in London he became a regular pundit on BBC radio, assessing the 1980s political unrest that heralded the release of Mandela. Following the abolition of apartheid, his criticisms of ANC one party rule annoyed the new rulers, but underlined his journalistic rectitude. In 2010 from his home in London he wrote that the ANCs plans to rein in the press were "mind blowing," and compared them to the censorship under the white government.

== Death ==
He died from a heart attack on 11 January 2014, aged 91, in London, where he had lived since the 1980s. He was survived by his second wife, Sarchen Burrell, and his two children from a previous marriage.
