= Richard Comito =

American politician (1939–2014)

Member of the Iowa Senate from the 17th district
- In office January 8, 1979 – January 10, 1983
- Preceded by: Fred Nolting
- Succeeded by: Joseph J. Welsh

Personal details
- Born: February 11, 1939 Des Moines, Iowa, U.S.
- Died: January 5, 2014 (aged 74) Waterloo, Iowa, U.S.
- Party: Republican

Richard Comito (February 11, 1939 – January 5, 2014) was an American politician who served in the Iowa Senate from the 17th district from 1979 to 1983.

He died on January 5, 2014, in Waterloo, Iowa, at age 74.
