= Qasim Akhgar =

Qasim Akhgar قسیم اخگر
- Qasim Akhgar
- Born: Muhammad Qasim; 1951; Kabul, Kingdom of Afghanistan
- Died: January 28, 2014 (aged 62–63); Kabul, Islamic Republic of Afghanistan

Qasim Akhgar (Dari: قسیم اخگر) was an author, researcher, civil society activist and theorist in Afghanistan.

== Early life ==
Qasim Akhgar was an ethnic Qizilbash. He was born in 1951 in Wazirabad area of Kabul and received his elementary and secondary education in the same city. He was arrested and expelled from school due to participation in political demonstrations of Leftist groups. During the Taliban rule, he migrated to neighboring countries. He returned to Afghanistan after the fall of the Taliban and began his political, social and journalistic activities in Kabul.

== Death ==
Qasim Akhgar died on 28 January 2014 in Kabul due to a heart attack.
