= Franciszek Malinowski (journalist) =

Polish journalist, philologist and scholar

- Born: Franciszek Malinowski; 23 May 1931; Wronki, Weimar Republic
- Died: 2 January 2014 (aged 82); Poland
- Education: John Paul II Catholic University of Lublin; University of Warsaw
- Occupations: Journalist, philologist, scholar
- Years active: 1956–1991

Franciszek Malinowski (23 May 1931 – 2 January 2014) was a Polish journalist, philologist and scholar.

Malinowski was born in 1931 in Wronki. He studied Polish literature at the John Paul II Catholic University of Lublin and Warsaw University in 1955, obtaining a master's degree there.

From 1954 until 1956, he worked at Polskie Radio Warsaw, and until 1964 at Polski Radio Lublin. From 1964 until 1980, he ran the Polish Press Agency (PAP) branch in Lublin. From 1980 until 1988, he was a correspondent for PAP in Vienna.

Since 1988, he was editor of Polski Radio, and then, after the Radiowo-Telewizyjny Ośrodek Nadawczy (Centre for Radio and Television) was established in Lublin, he served as its editor-in-chief and director. After retiring in 1991, he edited the "Forum Polonia" newsletter distributed to Polish communities around the world. He was also a member of the Society of Friends of Radio Lublin.

He was awarded both the Knight's Cross and the Officer's Cross of the Order of Polonia Restituta. He won several journalism awards, including the Badge of Merit for his contribution to the Lublin region and for the city.

Malinowski died on 2 January 2014, aged 82, in Poland.
