= Mora Windt-Martini =

Romanian handball player (1937-2014)

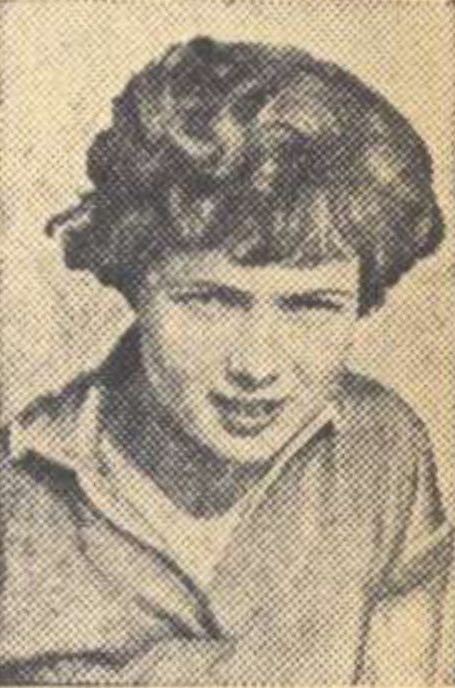
Mora Windt-Martini

Mora Windt-Martini (born Mora Windt; 7 August 1937−11 January 2014) was a Romanian-born handball player, who was a member of the World Championship-winning team in 1956 in Frankfurt am Main.

A Transylvanian Saxon, she was born in Brașov, and started playing at the Sports School in her home town. After winning the national championship with Progresul Brașov in 1956, she transferred to Tractorul Brașov.

In 1956, she was a member of the Romanian team which won the gold medal at the Field Handball World Championship in the Federal Republic of Germany, the first medal any Romanian ball sport team ever had won.

While being a handball player, she and her teammate Anna Stark were allowed as an exception to also be active first-league basketball players, playing for Voinţa Brașov. A midfielder and a southpaw, she retired from active play in 1962.

In June 2009, she was awarded the "Sports Merit" Order Second Class with one bar.

In 1960, she married Fritz Martini, who was also a handball player.

On January 11, 2014, she died in Haag, Germany.
