= Armando Rodriguez (businessman) =

Cuban-American entrepreneur

- Born: 1918
- Died: 2014 (aged 95–96)
- Occupation: Entrepreneur

Armando Rodriguez (November 18, 1918 - January 12, 2014) was a Cuban-American entrepreneur who was one of the first Cuban rafters, coming over with nine strangers in January 1961. Their rickety boat's engine failed and the group drifted for five days, with the captain of the group overthrowing himself at one point in despair. The group were rescued by an oil tanker off the coast of Daytona Beach, Florida.

== Career ==
He started his own business selling household items door to door in Cuba, eventually opening his own grocery store. He acquired enough money to buy land and property, and his family had electricity and TV, unusual in Cuba in 1957. Seeking adventure, he crossed the Florida Straits with nine others, settling first in Miami Beach. He flew his wife, Teresa, and two sons to Miami the next year and eventually bought his own store in Hialeah, Florida near a race track. Having success, he opened a bigger store that catered to a more mixed clientele eventually leading to his own wholesale business in 1972 in the Jackson Memorial Hospital district, serving customers with roots in Jamaica, the Bahamas, and Turks and Caicos. He sold the business in 2011, by which time he had already retired.
