= Giuseppe Frascarelli =

Italian footballer (c. 1923–2014)

Personal information
- Date of birth: c. 1923
- Place of birth: Ascoli Piceno, Kingdom of Italy
- Date of death: 7 January 2014 (aged 90)
- Place of death: Ascoli Piceno, Italy
- Position: Midfielder

Giuseppe Frascarelli (c. 1923 – 7 January 2014) was an Italian footballer who primarily played as a midfielder. During the 1940s, he captained Ascoli.

Giuseppe Frascarelli died on 7 January 2014, aged 90, in his hometown of Ascoli Piceno, Italy. He was survived by his wife and their three children.
