= Emiel Pauwels =

Belgian athlete

Emiel Pauwels (22 December 1918 - 7 January 2014) was a Belgian athlete of high jump, discus, javelin and running. He was best known for his gold at the European Indoor Athletics Championships Indoor in San Sebastian on the 60m sprint for veterans at the age of 94. The video of the sprint was a huge hit on YouTube.
