= Jack Tuell =

American lawyer

- Born: Jack Marvin Tuell; November 14, 1923; Tacoma, Washington, U.S.
- Died: January 10, 2014 (aged 90); Des Moines, Washington, U.S.
- Education: University of Washington School of Law; Boston University School of Theology (MDiv)
- Occupations: Minister; lawyer; activist
- Spouse: Marjorie Tuell
- Children: 3

Jack Marvin Tuell (November 14, 1923 – January 10, 2014) was an American Methodist minister and equal-rights advocate. He served as the United Methodist Church's Bishop of Portland, Oregon from 1972 to 1980 and of Los Angeles from 1980 to 1992. Tuell was a longtime opponent of same-sex marriage and the ordination of gay clergy. However, he became a vocal proponent and advocate for the acceptance of both issues within the church later in life. In 2012, Tuell spoke at the United Methodist General Conference in Tampa, Florida, to protest current church policy on these issues.

Tuell was born in 1923 in Tacoma, Washington. He served in the Army Air Forces during World War II. He received a law degree from the University of Washington School of Law in 1948 and practiced as a lawyer in Edmonds, Washington, for the next two years. Tuell later received his master of divinity degree from Boston University School of Theology.

Tuell may have been best known as the author of "The Organization of the United Methodist Church," which went through eleven editions and was used by Methodist students regularly in seminary church polity courses. He also was the author of an autobiography, "From Law to Grace," published in 2004.

Tuell died on January 10, 2014, at the Wesley Homes Health Center in Des Moines, Washington, at the age of 90. He was survived by his wife of 67 years, Marjorie Tuell, and three children, Jackie Joday, Cynthia Tuell, and Jim Tuell. The Greater Northwest Area Bishop Grant Hagiya stated in response to his death, "Bishops like him (Tuell) only come around once in a lifetime."
