= Deaths in October 2014 =

The following is a list of notable deaths in October 2014.

Entries for each day are listed alphabetically by surname. A typical entry lists information in the following sequence:

- Name, age, country of citizenship and reason for notability, established cause of death, reference.

== October 2014 ==
=== 1 ===
- Michel Baranger, 87, Franco-American theoretical physicist.
- Lynsey de Paul, 66, English singer-songwriter ("Sugar Me", "Won't Somebody Dance with Me"), brain haemorrhage.
- H. Patrick Glenn, 74, Canadian legal scholar.
- Sir Maurice Hodgson, 94, British business executive.
- Greg Hyder, 66, American basketball players (Cincinnati Royals).
- Shlomo Lahat, 86, Israeli general and politician, Mayor of Tel Aviv (1974–1993), lung infection.
- Fran Lynch, 68, American football player (Denver Broncos).
- José Martínez, 72, Cuban baseball player (Pittsburgh Pirates), coach (Kansas City Royals, Chicago Cubs) and executive (Atlanta Braves).
- Ronald McKinnon, 79, Canadian-born American applied economist, complications from a fall.
- Oluremi Oyo, 61, Nigerian journalist, cancer.
- Charlie Paulk, 68, American basketball player (Milwaukee Bucks, New York Knicks), heart attack.
- Matilde Pérez, 97, Chilean painter and kinetic artist.
- William Benjamin Polk, 84, American politician.
- Jerome Reppa, 89, American politician, member of the Indiana House of Representatives (1972–1990).
- Hans Sauter, 89, Austrian Olympic gymnast.
- George Savage, 72, British politician, MLA for Upper Bann (1998–2003, 2007–2011).
- Robert Serra, 27, Venezuelan politician, MLA for Caracas, stabbed.
- Guido van Gheluwe, 88, Belgian lawyer, founded Orde van den Prince.
- James I. West Jr., 84, American politician.
- Bob Young, 81, Scottish cricketer.

=== 2 ===
- David Banfield, 81, British priest.
- Fyodor Bogdanovsky, 84, Russian weightlifter, Olympic champion (1956).
- André Buffière, 91, French Olympic basketball player (1948, 1952).
- Priscilla Coolidge, 72–73, American recording artist, shot.
- Bill Crane, 90, Australian footballer.
- Joseph Cranston, 90, American actor (The Gale Storm Show, Dragnet) and film producer (The Crawling Hand).
- Harold "Deacon" Duvall, 97, American football coach.
- Herbert Eiteljörge, 79, German football player.
- Robert Flower, 59, Australian Hall of Fame VFL footballer (Melbourne).
- Michael Goldberg, 55, American screenwriter (Cool Runnings, Snow Dogs, Little Giants), brain and sinus cancer.
- Joanne M. Holden, 68, American nutritionist, cancer.
- Vaughn O. Lang, 86, American Army lieutenant general.
- György Lázár, 90, Hungarian politician, Chairman of the Council of Ministers (1975–1987).
- Carlos Lopez, 25, American stunt performer (The Hunger Games: Catching Fire, Teenage Mutant Ninja Turtles, John Wick), fall.
- N. Mahalingam, 91, Indian businessman.
- Pedro Peña, 88, Spanish actor (Médico de familia), Alzheimer's disease.
- Carolyn Rovee-Collier, 72, American professor of psychology, breast cancer and multiple sclerosis.
- Yoshikazu Sakamoto, 87, Japanese political scientist, heart failure.
- Fred Sommers, 91, American philosopher.
- The Spaceape, 44, British poet and disc jockey, cancer.

=== 3 ===
- Michael Allenby, 3rd Viscount Allenby, 83, British aristocrat and politician.
- Peer Augustinski, 74, German actor and German-language dub artist (Robin Williams), complications from epilepsy.
- Nati Cano, 81, Mexican-born American mariachi musician (Mariachi los Camperos), recipient of the National Heritage Fellowship (1990).
- Comer Cottrell, 82, American businessman and baseball team part-owner (Texas Rangers).
- Gordon Younger Craig, 89, Scottish geologist.
- George DeCicco, 85, American mobster.
- Bill Fiore, 74, American actor (The Corner Bar).
- ʻElisiva Fusipala Vahaʻi, 65, Tongan royal.
- Ewen Gilmour, 51, New Zealand comedian.
- Benedict Groeschel, 81, American Roman Catholic priest, author and television host, a founder of the Franciscan Friars of the Renewal.
- Alan Henning, 47, British humanitarian aid worker and ISIS hostage, beheading. (death reported on this date)
- Seaborn Jones, 71, American poet.
- Peter Knecht, 78, American defense attorney, cancer.
- Jean-Jacques Marcel, 83, French footballer (Olympique de Marseille).
- Kevin Metheny, 60, American radio executive (WNBC (AM), WGN (AM)), heart attack.
- Ward Ruyslinck, 85, Belgian author, Alzheimer's disease.
- Lori Sandri, 65, Brazilian football manager, brain tumor.
- Christopher van Wyk, 57, South African writer.

=== 4 ===
- Louise Terry Batties, 103, American clubwoman.
- Konrad Boehmer, 73, German-born Dutch composer and writer, stroke.
- Hugo Carvana, 77, Brazilian actor (Entranced Earth, Antonio das Mortes) and director (Casa da Mãe Joana).
- Fyodor Cherenkov, 55, Russian footballer (FC Spartak Moscow, Soviet national team).
- Bill Cummings, 85, American politician.
- Dorothy Davids, 91, American educator and activist.
- Thom Dickerson, 65, American journalist.
- Jean-Claude Duvalier, 63, Haitian politician, President (1971–1986), heart attack.
- Judith Edelman, 91, American architect, heart attack.
- Herman Mandui, 45, Papua New Guinean archaeologist.
- Joan Molina, 73, Spanish actor (Doctor Mateo).
- Jewel J. Newman, 93, American politician.
- Suhailah Noah, 82, Malaysian public figure, Spouse of the Prime Minister of Malaysia (1977–1981), widow of Hussein Onn.
- Gholamali Pouratayi, 73, Iranian musician.
- Paul Revere, 76, American musician, cancer.
- Morton Salkind, 82, American politician.
- Rajesh Sanghi, 42, Indian cricketer, heart attack.
- William Shija, 67, Tanzanian politician, Secretary General of the Commonwealth Parliamentary Association (since 2007).
- Silver Deputy, 29, Canadian Thoroughbred racehorse, euthanized.
- Gertjie Williams, 73, South African cricketer.

=== 5 ===
- John Best, 74, British-born American soccer player, coach and manager, lung infection.
- Al Bruno, 87, American CFL player (Toronto Argonauts) and coach (Hamilton Tiger-Cats), heart failure.
- Charlie Butler, 94, American basketball player.
- David Chavchavadze, 90, British-born American author and CIA officer.
- Andrea de Cesaris, 55, Italian racing driver (Formula One), traffic collision.
- Brahm Dutt, 88, Indian politician.
- Jimmy Feix, 83, American football player and coach.
- Anna Maria Gherardi, 74, Italian actress and voice actress (Lost Love, Petomaniac).
- Regis Groff, 79, American politician, member of the Colorado Senate (1974–1994).
- Göte Hagström, 96, Swedish steeplechase runner, Olympic bronze medalist (1948).
- Geoffrey Holder, 84, Trinidadian actor (Live and Let Die, Annie) and theatre director (The Wiz), Tony winner (1975), pneumonia.
- Philip Howard, 80, British journalist (The Times).
- Ike Jones, 84, American producer (A Man Called Adam) and actor (The Joe Louis Story, About Mrs. Leslie).
- Adalberto Lepri, 84, Italian Olympic wrestler.
- Yuri Lyubimov, 97, Russian stage actor and director, founder of the Taganka Theatre.
- Anna Przybylska, 35, Polish actress, pancreatic cancer.
- Ronnie Spafford, 86, British army officer and philatelist.
- Jack Turner, 84, American basketball player (New York Knicks).
- Misty Upham, 32, American actress (Frozen River, August: Osage County, Django Unchained), blunt force trauma.
- Tsai Wan-tsai, 85, Taiwanese financier.
- David Watson, 74, British-American actor (Beneath the Planet of the Apes), heart attack.

=== 6 ===
- King Block, 85, American football player.
- Veniamin Borisov, 79, Soviet Russian painter.
- Vic Braden, 85, American tennis player and instructor (University of Toledo), heart attack.
- Feridun Buğeker, 81, Turkish footballer.
- Bill Campbell, 91, American sportscaster.
- Philip J. Carroll, 76–77, American businessman.
- Chen Chi-lu, 91, Taiwanese politician, historian and anthropologist, multiple organ failure.
- Carlos César Delía, 91, Argentine equestrian and a brigade general.
- Denis Juneau, 89, Canadian painter, pneumonia.
- Andrew Kerr, 80, British festival organiser (Glastonbury Festival).
- Johnny Midnight, 73, Filipino radio and television host, prostate cancer.
- Igor Mitoraj, 70, Polish sculptor.
- Diane Nyland, 70, Canadian actress (The Trouble with Tracy), heart failure and COPD.
- Mikhail Potylchak, 42, Russian footballer, suicide by hanging.
- Marian Seldes, 86, American actress (A Delicate Balance, Affliction, August Rush), Tony winner (1967), complications from Alzheimer's disease.
- Apiwan Wiriyachai, 65, Thai politician, lung cancer.
- Serhiy Zakarlyuka, 38, Ukrainian football player (Dnipro, national team) and manager, traffic collision.

=== 7 ===
- Lloyd J. Andrews, 94, American politician and businessman.
- Walter Bockmayer, 66, German writer and film director, lung cancer.
- Federico Boido, 76, Italian actor and stuntman (Ace High, Superfly T.N.T.).
- Ugo Carrega, 79, Italian artist and poet.
- Cigar, 24, American thoroughbred racehorse, complications of neck surgery for osteoarthritis.
- Nuno Miguel Cerqueira Dias, 37, Portuguese swimmer.
- Morrell Gathright, 95, American politician.
- George Giokas, 90, Canadian football player (Regina Roughriders).
- John D. Jones, 91, American politician.
- Nika Kiladze, 25, Georgian footballer, traffic collision.
- Etsuko Komiya, 94, Japanese Olympic sprinter.
- Richard Laws, 88, British zoologist, Director of the British Antarctic Survey (1973–1987), Master of St Edmund's College, Cambridge (1987–1996).
- Siegfried Lenz, 88, German writer.
- Angus Macleod, 63, British journalist and editor, cancer.
- Paul Margulies, 79, American philosopher and advertising executive.
- Nancy Merki, 88, American Olympic swimmer.
- Amos Mkhari, South African footballer.
- David Samuel, 92, British-Israeli scientist and peer.
- Zilpha Keatley Snyder, 87, American writer (The Egypt Game), stroke.
- Brad Stanius, 68, American politician, member of the Minnesota House of Representatives.
- Soviet Star, 30, American Thoroughbred racehorse.
- Ivor Wilks, 86, British historian.
- Iva Withers, 97, Canadian-born American theatre actress and singer.

=== 8 ===
- Aleksandra Antonova, 82, Russian, Kildin Sámi teacher, writer, poet and translator.
- Mark Bell, 43, British musician and house music producer (LFO), complications from surgery.
- Gerardo Budowski, 89, German–Venezuelan chess master, natural causes.
- Thomas Eric Duncan, 42, Liberian courier, first person diagnosed with Ebola in the United States, Ebola virus disease.
- Dave Engellenner, 95, Australian footballer.
- Shon Harris, 46, American author.
- Morris Lurie, 75, Australian writer, cancer.
- Abdul Matin, 87, Bangladeshi language activist (Bengali language movement).
- Alden E. Matthews, 93, American missionary.
- Harden M. McConnell, 87, American chemistry professor (Stanford University).
- Angelo Mottola, 79, Italian Roman Catholic archbishop and diplomat.
- Helmut Ruge, 74, German comedian, actor, and cabaret writer.
- Jeen van den Berg, 86, Dutch Olympic speedskater (1956, 1960), winner of the Elfstedentocht (1954).
- Mike Waugh, 58, American politician, member of the Pennsylvania State Senate (1998–2014), cancer.

=== 9 ===
- Les Angell, 92, English cricketer (Somerset).
- Tibor Badari, 66, Hungarian Olympic boxer.
- Henning Bjerregaard, 87, Danish footballer.
- John Patrick Boles, 84, American Roman Catholic prelate, titular bishop of Nova Sparsa.
- Boris Buzančić, 85, Croatian actor and politician.
- Sir Sydney Chapman, 78, English politician and architect, MP for Birmingham Handsworth (1970–1974) and Chipping Barnet (1979–2005).
- Jan Hooks, 57, American comedian and actress (Saturday Night Live, Designing Women, Batman Returns), cancer.
- M. V. Kamath, 93, Indian journalist.
- Ana Karić, 73, Croatian actress.
- Carolyn Kizer, 89, American poet, Pulitzer Prize winner, complications of dementia.
- Matt Koehl, 79, American neo-Nazi.
- Kim Koscki, 50, American stunt performer (The Mighty Ducks, Contact, Apollo 13), cardiac arrest.
- Paul Lukather, 88, American actor (Bright Promise, Dinosaurus!, Metal Gear Solid 2: Sons of Liberty).
- Clifford M. Lytle, 82, American political scientist.
- Willy Matsanga, 45, Congolese politician.
- Ray Metzker, 83, American photographer.
- Peter A. Peyser, 93, American politician, member of the U.S. House for New York's 25th (1971–1973) and 23rd (1973–1977, 1979–1983) districts, Parkinson's disease.
- Tony Priday, 92, English bridge player.
- David Rayvern Allen, 76, English cricket historian, cancer.
- Style Scott, 58, Jamaican reggae drummer.
- Rita Shane, 78, American operatic soprano, pancreatic and liver cancer.
- Paul Allen Simmons, 93, American federal judge, U.S. District Court Judge for the Western District of Pennsylvania (since 1978).
- Robert Sproull, 96, American educator and physicist.
- Sir Jocelyn Stevens, 82, English publishing executive.
- Connell Thode, 103, New Zealand naval officer (HMS Scythian) and yachtsman.
- Victor Winding, 85, British actor (Doctor Who, Emmerdale).

=== 10 ===
- Ivan Armstrong, 86, New Zealand field hockey player and coach, tennis umpire, and educator.
- Gaston Banda-Bafiot, 80, Central African engineer, diplomat, and politician, Minister of Mines and Geology (1981), Ambassador of the Central African Republic to the United States (1973-1975).
- Prue Barron, 97, Scottish surgeon.
- C. Curtis-Smith, 73, American composer and pianist.
- Olav Dale, 55, Norwegian composer and jazz saxophonist.
- Damiana Eugenio, 93, Filipino author and professor.
- Peter Jackson, 80, Irish tennis player.
- Valeri Karpov, 43, Russian Olympic ice hockey player (1994), world champion (1993), head injury.
- Lari Ketner, 37, American basketball player (Chicago Bulls, Cleveland Cavaliers, Indiana Pacers), colon cancer.
- Pavel Landovský, 78, Czech actor and dissident, heart attack.
- Roy Law, 77, English footballer (Wimbledon).
- Finn Lied, 98, Norwegian military researcher and politician.
- Jonathan Mane-Wheoki, 70, New Zealand art historian, curator and academic, pancreatic cancer.
- Geoff Miller, 72, Australian public servant.
- Amildo Morales, 76, Guatemalan politician, MP for Jalapa (since 2012), attacked by a bull.
- Albert Nilges, 85, American politician.
- Ed Nimmervoll, 67, Australian music journalist and author, brain cancer.
- Ichirō Satake, 86, Japanese mathematician, respiratory failure.
- Marianne Sjöblom, 80, Finnish Olympic fencer (1952).
- John Westcott, 93, British computer scientist.
- Ernie Wiggs, 73, New Zealand rugby league player (Auckland, national team).
- Anatoly Yagudaev, 79, Russian sculptor.

=== 11 ===
- Abbas Ali, 94, Indian politician and independence activist.
- Anita Cerquetti, 83, Italian soprano.
- Tanhum Cohen-Mintz, 75, Israeli basketball player, cancer.
- Elbert Drungo, 71, American football player (Houston Oilers, Buffalo Bills), cancer.
- Walter Fitzgerald, 78, Canadian politician, Mayor of Halifax (1971–1974, 1994–1996), MLA for Halifax Chebucto (1974–1981).
- Donald Gauf, 87, Canadian Olympic champion ice hockey player (1952).
- Margaret Hillert, 94, American author.
- Jazil, 11, American thoroughbred racehorse, injuries sustained in paddock accident.
- Jason Jurman, 34, American actor (Law & Order: Special Victims Unit, Blue Bloods, Cougar Club).
- Brian Lemon, 77, British jazz pianist.
- Gary McLarty, 73, American stunt performer (The Terminator, Jurassic Park, Beverly Hills Cop), traffic collision.
- Bob Orrison, 86, American stunt performer (Stargate, Road House, Speed), traffic collision.
- Mats Rondin, 54, Swedish cellist and composer, heart attack.
- Carmelo Simeone, 80, Argentine footballer (Vélez Sarsfield, Boca Juniors).
- Bob Such, 70, Australian politician, member of the South Australian House of Assembly for Fisher (since 1989), brain tumour.

=== 12 ===
- Jack A. Apsche, 67, American psychologist.
- Cleo Baldon, 87, American architect, landscape architect, and furniture designer.
- Geoff Elliott, 83, British decathlete.
- Tony Hibbert, 96, British army officer.
- Louise Daniel Hutchinson, 86, American historian.
- Aki Jones, 31, American football player (Washington Redskins), car accident.
- Maurie Keane, 91, Australian politician, member of the New South Wales Legislative Assembly for Woronora (1973–1988).
- Bob Kelly, 78, American professional wrestler.
- Tommy Lewis, 83, American football player (University of Alabama, Ottawa Rough Riders).
- Lojze Logar, 70, Slovene artist.
- Tony Lynes, 85, British anti-poverty campaigner.
- Ali Mazrui, 81, Kenyan professor and political writer.
- Graham Miles, 73, English snooker player.
- Hussein Mjalli, 77, Jordanian lawyer and politician, involved in legal defence of Saddam Hussein, Justice Minister (2011), heart attack.
- Enrique Santiago Petracchi, 78, Argentine lawyer and judge, member of the Supreme Court (since 1983).
- Emilio Picasso, 87, Italian physicist.
- Robert Relf, 90, English political activist.
- Roberto Telch, 70, Argentine footballer (San Lorenzo, national team), heart attack.

=== 13 ===
- Sir John Bradfield, 89, British biologist and entrepreneur, founder of Cambridge Science Park.
- Barrie Brown, 83, Australian footballer.
- Antonio Cafiero, 92, Argentine politician, Governor of Buenos Aires (1987–1991), Senator (1993–2005), pneumonia.
- Patricia Carson, 85, British historian and author.
- Mario Mellado García, 98, Mexican politician, Governor of Puebla (1972). (death announced on this date)
- Margaret Helen Harper, 95, American computer programmer.
- Tsutomu Katsuki, 68, Japanese organic chemist.
- Charles Lovell, 91, British trade unionist.
- Shōsuke Nakawa, 83, Japanese playwright and theatre director.
- Elizabeth Norment, 61, American actress (House of Cards, Party of Five, Doogie Howser, M.D.), cancer.
- Agnes Owens, 88, Scottish author.
- Pentti Raaskoski, 85, Finnish Olympic sprint canoer.
- Gabrielle Reidy, 54, Irish actress (The Clinic, Girl with a Pearl Earring, The Devil's Own), cancer.
- José Hernán Sánchez Porras, 70, Venezuelan Roman Catholic prelate, Bishop of Military Ordinariate (since 2001).
- Mohammad Sarengat, 74, Indonesian sprinter, Asian Games champion (1962), complications from a stroke.
- Pontus Segerström, 33, Swedish footballer (IF Brommapojkarna), cancer.
- Kapil Krishna Thakur, 74, Indian politician, MP for Bangaon.
- Deborah Warren, 55, Argentine actress, cancer.

=== 14 ===
- Tamar Ariel, 25, Israeli Air Force navigator, freezing.
- Art Best, 61, American football player (Chicago Bears).
- Mary Downer, 89, Australian arts patron.
- Eve Dutton, 86, Australian lecturer and politician.
- Encke, 5, American-bred British-trained thoroughbred racehorse, euthanized.
- Humberto Lara Gavidia, El Salvadoran baseball player.
- Ted Gullicksen, 60–61, American social justice activist.
- Doğan Güreş, 88, Turkish general and politician.
- A. H. Halsey, 91, British sociologist.
- Bertha George Harris, 101, American tribal elder and potter, was oldest member of the Catawba people.
- Paul Hubbert, 78, American educator and politician.
- Jean-Claude Lefebvre, 81, French cyclist.
- Leonard Liggio, 81, American libertarian author.
- Ron Loewinsohn, 76, American poet.
- Oriel Malet, 91, British novelist.
- Heidrun Mohr-Mayer, 73, German jeweller and philanthropist.
- Paul Muenzer, 82, American school administrator and politician, Mayor of Naples, Florida (1992–1996), liver and pancreatic cancer.
- Joe H. Mulholland, 80, American politician, Mississippi State Senator (1964–1968, 1976–1984), cancer.
- Bob Neilson, 91, New Zealand rugby league player (West Coast, national team).
- Paul J. Olscamp, 77, Canadian university administrator.
- Isaiah "Ikey" Owens, 39, American keyboardist, heart attack.
- Elizabeth Peña, 55, American actress (The Incredibles, Rush Hour, Jacob's Ladder), cirrhosis.
- Hans Ernst Schneider, 87, Swiss Olympic sprinter.
- John Stephenson, 77, Australian football player (Carlton), plane crash.
- Dharmaraj Thapa, 90, Nepali folk singer.
- Walter Victor, 97, American sports photographer.

=== 15 ===
- Sir James Balderstone, 93, Australian businessman and company director.
- João Corso, 86, Brazilian Roman Catholic prelate, Bishop of Campos (1990–1995).
- Filipe Oliveira Dias, 50, Portuguese architect.
- Marie Dubois, 77, French actress (Shoot the Piano Player, Jules and Jim, Monte Carlo or Bust!), multiple sclerosis.
- Doris Hering, 94, American dance critic.
- James Semple Kerr, 82, Australian architectural historian.
- Christian Kinck, 58, French Olympic weightlifter.
- Mile Krajina, 90, Croatian gusle player.
- José Refugio Mercado Díaz, 72, Mexican Roman Catholic prelate, Auxiliary Bishop of Tehuantepec (2003–2009).
- Victor Ottoboni, 80, American soccer player.
- Giovanni Reale, 83, Italian philosophy historian.
- Giorgio Rebuffi, 85, Italian comic book artist (Tiramolla, Cucciolo).
- Jiří Reynek, 85, Czech graphic artist, poet and translator.
- William Ronan, 101, American public servant, first chairman of MTA.
- Sabir Shaikh, 71, Indian politician.
- Sir Christopher Staughton, 81, British jurist, Lord Justice of Appeal, President of the Court of Appeal of Gibraltar (2005–2006).
- Robert Tiernan, 85, American politician, member of the U.S. House for Rhode Island's 2nd district (1967–1975).
- Davyd Whaley, 46, American painter.
- Nobby Wirkowski, 88, American football player (Toronto Argonauts) and coach (York University).

=== 16 ===
- Ioannis Charalambopoulos, 95, Greek army officer and politician, Deputy Prime Minister (1985–1988).
- Laurence Clancy, 85, British aerodynamicist.
- Patrick Paul D'Souza, 86, Indian Roman Catholic prelate, Bishop of Varanasi (1971–2007).
- James E. Defebaugh, 88, American politician, member of the Michigan House of Representatives (1971–1982).
- Ertuğrul Oğuz Fırat, 91, Turkish composer, painter, and poet.
- Allen Forte, 87, American music theorist and musicologist.
- Sumi Haru, 75, American actress (Krakatoa, East of Java), Interim President of the Screen Actors Guild (1995), emphysema.
- Tim Hauser, 72, American musician (The Manhattan Transfer), cardiac arrest.
- Seppo Kuusela, 80, Finnish basketball player.
- David Shepherd Nivison, 91, American sinologist.
- Shalom Schwarz, 63, Israeli footballer.
- John Spencer-Churchill, 11th Duke of Marlborough, 88, British peer, custodian of Blenheim Palace.
- Peggy Stevenson, 90, American politician, heart failure.

=== 17 ===
- Shobha Abhyankar, 68, Indian musicologist and teacher, cancer.
- John Andrew, 83, British-born American Anglican priest.
- Edwards Barham, 77, American politician, Louisiana State Senator (1976–1980), plane crash.
- Gero Bisanz, 78, German football player and coach.
- Claude Brodin, 80, French Olympic fencer (1964).
- Robert Donald Cohen, 81, British physician.
- Alfred Croisetière, 92, Canadian politician.
- Bill Diachuk, 85, Canadian politician, MLA (1971–1986).
- Arif Doğan, 68–69, Turkish officer.
- Masaru Emoto, 71, Japanese author.
- Hermione Hobhouse, 80, British architectural historian.
- Joseph Hogan, 77, American politician, member of the Nevada Assembly (since 2005).
- Vladimír Hrivnák, 69, Slovak football player and manager.
- Leigh Kamman, 92, American radio host.
- José Luis Lobato, 76, Mexican politician, Senator for Veracruz (2006–2012), shot.
- Dean Loucks, 79, American college football coach (Fordham Rams).
- Mikhail Marynich, 74, Belarusian politician.
- Anna Nakagawa, 49, Japanese actress (A Sign Days, Godzilla vs. King Ghidorah), uterine cancer.
- Daisuke Oku, 38, Japanese footballer (Júbilo Iwata, Yokohama F. Marinos), traffic collision.
- Lawrence J. Quirk, 91, American writer, Hollywood reporter and film historian.
- Jon Ramstad, 89, Norwegian politician.
- Tom Shaw, 69, American Episcopal prelate, Bishop of Massachusetts (1995–2014), brain cancer.
- Berndt von Staden, 95, German diplomat, Ambassador to the United States (1973–1979).

=== 18 ===
- Horst Arndt, 80, German Olympic silver medallist rower (1956).
- Robin Barbour, 93, Scottish minister and author.
- Joanne Borgella, 32, American singer (American Idol) and model (Mo'Nique's Fat Chance), endometrial cancer.
- Ralph Churches, 96, Australian soldier.
- Paul Craft, 76, American musician and songwriter ("Brother Jukebox").
- Choi Soon-dal, 83, South Korean scientist.
- Eduardo D'Angelo, 75, Uruguayan actor, comedian and impressionist.
- Jimmy Docherty, 83, Scottish rugby footballer.
- Efua Dorkenoo, 65, Ghanaian-born British campaigner against female genital mutilation, cancer.
- Sir Peter Downward, 90, British army general.
- Luigi Gnocchi, 81, Italian Olympic sprinter.
- Robert B. Grady, 71, American software engineer, ruptured aneurysm.
- Kenneth House, 78, English cricketer (Dorset).
- Danny Light, 66, English footballer (Crystal Palace, Colchester United).
- Lou Lucier, 96, American baseball player (Boston Red Sox, Philadelphia Phillies).
- Rachel Makinson, 97, Australian research scientist.
- R. C. Mehta, 96, Indian musician and musicologist.
- Claude Ollier, 91, French nouveau roman author.
- Bruce Phillips, 85, Australian football player (St Kilda).
- Rick S. Piltz, 71, American climate analyst, metastasized liver cancer.
- Edward Regan, 84, American politician, New York State Comptroller (1979–1993).
- Mariano Lebrón Saviñón, 92, Dominican author and academic.
- Sidney Shapiro, 98, American-born Chinese author and translator.
- Melford Spiro, 94, American cultural anthropologist.
- Rebel Steiner, 87, American football player (Green Bay Packers).
- Veandercross, 26, New Zealand Thoroughbred horse.
- Paul Henry Walsh, 77, American Roman Catholic prelate, Auxiliary Bishop of Rockville Centre (2003–2012).
- Mervyn Winfield, 81, English cricketer (Nottinghamshire).
- Yoshisada Yonezuka, 77, Japanese-born American judoka.

=== 19 ===
- A. F. Salahuddin Ahmed, 90, Bangladeshi historian.
- Frank Barnes, 88, American Major League Baseball player.
- William Barrington-Coupe, 83, Welsh record producer.
- Lynda Bellingham, 66, Canadian-born British actress (Doctor Who, General Hospital, The Bill), colon cancer.
- Cecil Carston, 87, New Zealand cricketer.
- Gloria Casarez, 42, American civil rights activist, cancer.
- Kathryn Chaloner, 60, British-born American statistician, Professor of Biostatistics (University of Iowa).
- Leonore Davidoff, 82, American historian.
- Edward Donno, 79, American stunt performer (Daredevil, The Untouchables, Star Trek).
- Stuart Gallacher, 68, Welsh rugby player (national union and league teams) and executive.
- John Holt, 67, Jamaican singer (The Paragons) and songwriter ("The Tide Is High"), cancer.
- Ed Keegan, 75, American baseball player (Philadelphia Phillies, Kansas City Athletics).
- James Levesque, 52, American bassist (Agent Orange).
- Arnold Mitchell, 84, English footballer (Exeter City).
- Étienne Mourrut, 74, French politician, MP for Gard's 2nd constituency (2002–2012), Mayor of Le Grau-du-Roi (1983–2014).
- Francis Nkwain, 84, Cameroonian senator.
- Gerard Parkes, 90, Irish-born Canadian actor (Fraggle Rock, The Boondock Saints).
- Stephen Paulus, 65, American composer, complications from a stroke.
- Imre Pichler, 67, Hungarian politician, MP for Szigetvár.
- Don Ratcliffe, 79, English footballer (Stoke City).
- Raphael Ravenscroft, 60, British saxophonist ("Baker Street") and author, suspected heart attack.
- Miloslava Rezková, 64, Czech high jumper, Olympic champion (1968).
- Jim Sharkey, 80, Scottish footballer (Celtic).
- Serena Shim, 29, Lebanese-born American journalist (Press TV), traffic collision.
- Ken Short, 87, Australian Anglican prelate, Assistant Bishop of Sydney.
- Bob Spear, 94, American naturalist, founder of Birds of Vermont Museum.

=== 20 ===
- Ox Baker, 80, American professional wrestler and actor (Escape from New York), heart attack.
- Gilbert Baumslag, 81, American mathematician.
- Raymond Beadle, 70, American Hall of Fame drag racer, heart attack.
- Dennis Biodrowski, 74, American football player (Kansas City Chiefs).
- Gerd Bonk, 63, German weightlifter, Olympic bronze (1972) and silver (1976) medalist.
- René Burri, 81, Swiss photographer, cancer.
- Lilli Carati, 58, Italian actress (Being Twenty, La compagna di banco), brain tumor.
- L. M. Kit Carson, 73, American screenwriter and actor (Paris, Texas, Running on Empty).
- Peter Daland, 93, American swimming coach (University of Southern California, 1964 Olympic women, 1972 Olympic men).
- Hayward Davis, 86, American politician.
- Bob Dawson, 90, American television personality, meteorologist, and producer.
- Jim Dunegan, 67, American baseball player (Chicago Cubs).
- Robert Kevin Ellis, 60, British millionaire businessman, slashed.
- Rodney Fitch, 76, English designer, cancer.
- Sir John Hoskyns, 87, British businessman, policy advisor to Margaret Thatcher.
- Rajam Krishnan, 89, Indian writer.
- Ursula Lingen, 86, Austrian actress (The Model Husband).
- Pete Livermore, 73, American politician, member of the Nevada Assembly (since 2011), heart attack.
- David Malcolm, 76, Australian judge, Chief Justice of Western Australia (1988–2006).
- Christophe de Margerie, 63, French businessman, CEO of Total S.A. (since 2007), plane crash.
- Pavle Merkù, 87, Slovene composer.
- Gary Plauché, 68, American vigilante murderer, stroke.
- Oscar de la Renta, 82, Dominican fashion designer, cancer.
- Tom Slade Jr., 78, American lobbyist, Chairman of the Republican Party of Florida (1993–1999), member of the Florida Legislature, heart failure.
- John Solomon, 82, English croquet player.
- Arthur Trestrail, 93, Trinidadian cricketer.

=== 21 ===
- Jim Barrett Jr., 83, English footballer (West Ham).
- Sushil Biswas, Indian politician.
- Ben Bradlee, 93, American journalist, Executive Editor of The Washington Post (1968–1991), Alzheimer's disease.
- Otto Brolo, 85, Guatemalan sports shooter.
- Chen Ziming, 62, Chinese democracy activist, pancreatic cancer.
- Johnny Lee Clary, 55, American professional wrestler, preacher and reformed Ku Klux Klan leader.
- Roger Darvell, 83, English footballer, stroke.
- Dale Dorman, 71, American radio disc jockey (WODS).
- Laurențiu Dumănoiu, 63, Romanian volleyball player.
- Seth Gaaikema, 75, Dutch comedian and writer, heart failure.
- Nelson Bunker Hunt, 88, American oil company executive, cancer and dementia.
- Mohammad-Reza Mahdavi Kani, 83, Iranian politician, Acting Prime Minister (1981), Minister of Interior (1980–1981), heart failure.
- George Kline, 93, American translator and philosopher.
- Yasumasa Narasaki, 86, Japanese politician, member of the House of Councilors (1992–1998), pneumonia.
- Jean Packard, 91, American politician.
- Joan Quigley, 87, American astrologer.
- Tuna Scanlan, 80, Samoan boxer.
- Rudolf Schmid, 63, Austrian luger, Olympic bronze medalist (1976), traffic collision.
- Peter Trotter, 58, Australian Paralympic wheelchair racer.
- Gough Whitlam, 98, Australian politician, Prime Minister (1972–1975).
- Catherine Mary Wisnicki, 95, Canadian architect.

=== 22 ===
- Murad Ashurly, 41, Azerbaijani mountaineer, fall from mountain.
- Gert Boshoff, 83, South African Army general.
- Martin Chalmers, 65, British translator.
- Anatoly Chertkov, 78, Russian footballer.
- Rhiannon Davies Jones, 92, Welsh novelist.
- Elizabeth Forbes, 90, British writer and musicologist.
- George Francis, 80, English footballer (Brentford).
- John-Roger Hinkins, 80, American author and public speaker, founder of the Movement of Spiritual Inner Awareness.
- Ashok Kumar, 72, Indian cinematographer and film director (Abhinandana).
- Carol Lancaster, 72, American diplomat and academic, brain tumor.
- Barry McSweeney, Irish scientist, Chief Science Advisor (2004–2005).
- Paul Nabor, 86, Belizean musician.
- Luther Pennington, 92, American United Methodist pastor and politician.
- John Postgate, 93, British microbiologist and writer, professor at University of Sussex.
- David Redfern, 78, English photographer, cancer.
- Sonia Rolt, 95, British canal conservationist.
- Rinnat Safin, 74, Soviet biathlete, Olympic champion (1972).
- Phil Turner, 87, English footballer (Carlisle United, Bradford Park Avenue, Chester).

=== 23 ===
- Ghulam Azam, 91, Bangladeshi convicted war criminal, Emir of Jamaat-e-Islami (1969–2000), stroke.
- Jeanne Black, 76, American country singer.
- John Bramlett, 73, American football player (Boston Patriots).
- Clarence Addison Brimmer Jr., 92, American federal judge, Wyoming Attorney General (1971–1974).
- Robert C. Calfee, 81, American educational psychologist, stomach cancer.
- Spanky Davis, 71, American jazz trumpeter.
- Sir Ronald Grierson, 93, British banker.
- Hayden Howard, 88, American poet and author.
- Göran Johansson, 69, Swedish politician and union leader, Chairman of the Gothenburg Municipality Executive Board (1988–1991, 1994–2009), cancer.
- Terry Keenan, 53, American financial news anchor and journalist (CNN, FNC, New York Post), cerebral hemorrhage.
- Frederic S. Lee, 64, American economist.
- Clyde T. Lusk, 81, American coast guard officer, Vice Commandant of the United States Coast Guard (1988–1990).
- Frank Mankiewicz, 90, American journalist and political adviser, press secretary to Robert F. Kennedy.
- Bernard Mayes, 85, British-born American broadcaster and academic.
- André Piters, 83, Belgian footballer (Standard Liège).
- Tullio Regge, 83, Italian theoretical physicist.
- Denma Locho Rinpoche, 86, Tibetan lama.
- Alvin Stardust, 72, English singer ("My Coo Ca Choo").
- Raleigh Trevelyan, 91, British author.
- Alan Tyrrell, 81, British lawyer and politician, MEP (1979–1984).

=== 24 ===
- Esmeralda Agoglia, 91, Argentine prima ballerina and choreographer.
- Alagappa Alagappan, 88, Indian-born American official.
- Lorenzo Albacete, 73, American theologian and Roman Catholic priest.
- Kim Anderzon, 71, Swedish film and theatre actress (Göta kanal eller Vem drog ur proppen?, Rederiet), spinal cancer.
- Vic Ash, 84, English jazz saxophonist and clarinetist.
- Joseph Battisto, 83, American politician.
- Ted Beniades, 91, American actor (Scarface, Serpico, The Jackie Gleason Show).
- Robert Brink, 90, American violinist, conductor, and educator.
- Jacksel M. Broughton, 89, American air force officer and fighter pilot.
- Reuben Cohen, 93, Canadian lawyer, Chancellor of Dalhousie University (1990–1994).
- Jean-Michel Coulon, 94, French painter.
- Mike Dorsey, 84, English-born Australian actor (Number 96).
- Allison J. Doupe, 60, Canadian neuroscientist, cancer.
- Martin Garratt, 34, English footballer (York City).
- James F. Hastings, 88, American politician.
- Shirley Hooper, 78, American politician, Secretary of State of New Mexico (1979–1982).
- Jenny James, 87, Welsh swimmer.
- Gajanan Kathaley, 67, Indian cricketer.
- Gordon MacWilliam, 91, British Anglican priest.
- Pat McGlothin, 93, American baseball player (Brooklyn Dodgers).
- Mbulaeni Mulaudzi, 34, South African middle-distance runner, Olympic silver medalist (2004), traffic collision.
- S. S. Rajendran, 86, Indian actor, lung infection.
- Creighton Robertson, 70, American prelate, Episcopal Bishop of South Dakota.
- Emily Ruto, 25, Kenyan cricketer (national women's team), leukemia.
- Marcia Strassman, 66, American actress (Welcome Back, Kotter, Honey, I Shrunk the Kids, M*A*S*H) and singer, breast cancer.
- Malcolm Thompson, 68, English footballer (Scarborough).
- Tugela, 19, American-born Australian thoroughbred horse.
- Alvin Wiederspahn, 65, American politician.

=== 25 ===
- Radmilo Bogdanović, 80, Serbian politician.
- Jack Bruce, 71, Scottish bassist (Cream, Manfred Mann) and composer, liver disease.
- Gerry Burrell, 90, Scottish football player.
- Oliver S. Crosby, 94, American diplomat.
- Buzz Emick, 75, American attorney and politician.
- Zbigniew Hnatio, 61, Polish footballer
- Ari Hoogenboom, 86, American historian.
- Peter Baptist Tadamaro Ishigami, 93, Japanese Roman Catholic prelate, Bishop of Naha (1972–1997).
- Reyhaneh Jabbari, 26, Iranian convicted murderer, subject of international campaign against her execution, execution by hanging.
- Peter Maxey, 83, British diplomat, Ambassador to the United Nations (1984–1986).
- Carlos Morales Troncoso, 74, Dominican politician, Vice President (1986–1994), Secretary of Foreign Affairs (1994–1996, 2004–2014), leukemia.
- Sheila Shulman, 77, American-born British rabbi.
- David Somerset, 84, British banker, Chief Cashier of the Bank of England (1980–1988).
- Jim Stangeland, 92, American football player and coach.

=== 26 ===
- Genpei Akasegawa, 77, Japanese author and artist, sepsis.
- Jamil Alibekov, 86, Azerbaijani writer and public figure.
- Vic Allen, 91, British academic, sociologist, historian and trade unionist (National Union of Mineworkers).
- David Armstrong, 60, American photographer, liver cancer.
- Françoise Bertin, 89, French actress.
- Mo Collins, 38, American football player (Oakland Raiders), kidney failure.
- Katrina Edwards, 46, American geomicrobiologist.
- Rémi Fraisse, 21, French botanist, hit by stun grenade.
- Germain Gagnon, 71, Canadian ice hockey player (Chicago Blackhawks, Montreal Canadiens, New York Islanders).
- Michael Hawkins, 86, British actor (The Hound of the Baskervilles, Doctor Who).
- Cliff Hysell, 72, American football player and coach (Montana State Bobcats).
- Dudley Knowles, 67, British philosopher, cancer.
- Rod Love, 61, Canadian political strategist, cancer.
- Jennifer McCrindle, 46, Scottish actress (Looking After Jo Jo, Psychos, Heavenly Pursuits), complications from multiple sclerosis.
- Senzo Meyiwa, 30, South African footballer (Orlando Pirates, national team), shot.
- Brian Moore, 70, Australian rugby league player (Newtown Jets).
- Hisahiko Okazaki, 84, Japanese diplomat and political commentator.
- Oscar Orefici, 68, Italian journalist and writer.
- Nikola Parchanov, 84, Bulgarian Olympic footballer.
- Manuel Revollo Crespo, 89, Bolivian Roman Catholic prelate, Bishop of Bolivian Military (2000–2012).
- Jeff Robinson, 52, American baseball player (Detroit Tigers).
- Gavin Smith, 59, American film studio executive, missing since 2012. (body discovered on this date)
- Gordy Soltau, 89, American football player (San Francisco 49ers).
- Oscar Taveras, 22, Dominican baseball player (St. Louis Cardinals), traffic collision.
- Antonio Terenghi, 92, Italian comic book artist (Pedrito el Drito, Tarzanetto).
- Sir Tay Wilson, 89, New Zealand sports official.
- Bob Wood, 93, American basketball player (Sheboygan Red Skins).

=== 27 ===
- Ron Adam, 80, Canadian football player (Saskatchewan Roughriders).
- Daniel Boulanger, 92, French actor and screenwriter.
- Norman Hansen, 90, American public official, Town Manager of Saugus, Massachusetts (1987–1992).
- Thurston Hopkins, 101, British photojournalist.
- Bob Kenney, 83, American basketball player, Olympic champion (1952).
- Kåre Langvik-Johannessen, 95, Norwegian philologist, literary historian and translator.
- Charles McCullough, 91, Northern Irish politician, member of the Senate (1968–1972).
- Ian Monro, 87, New Zealand naval officer (HMNZS Lachlan).
- Chris Nance, 74, American conductor.
- Shin'ichi Okada, 86, Japanese architect.
- William Orchard, 84, Australian Olympic water polo player and psychiatrist.
- Dan Peters, 60, American college basketball coach (Youngstown State), pancreatic cancer.
- Lucio Sangermano, 82, Italian Olympic sprinter.
- Shin Hae-chul, 46, South Korean pop singer (N.EX.T), heart attack.
- Leif Skiöld, 79, Swedish footballer and ice hockey player.
- Richard Stretch, 61, South African cricketer.
- Reidar Sundby, 88, Norwegian footballer (Larvik Turn).
- Starke Taylor, 92, American politician, Mayor of Dallas (1983–1987).
- Dub Williams, 87, American politician, member of the New Mexico House of Representatives (1995–2009).

=== 28 ===
- Ronald Norman Dalby, 85, Canadian engineer and academic administrator, Chancellor of the University of Alberta (1974–1978).
- Romualdas Granauskas, 75, Lithuanian writer.
- Mansour Hobeika, 72, Lebanese Maronite Catholic prelate, Bishop of Zahlé (since 2002).
- Koichiro Kimura, 44, Japanese mixed martial artist and professional wrestler, pneumonia.
- Galway Kinnell, 87, American poet, Pulitzer Prize winner, leukemia.
- James William Lair, 90, American CIA case officer.
- Nedo Logli, 91, Italian cyclist.
- John Ross Mackay, 98, Canadian geographer.
- Jim Paxson Sr., 81, American basketball player (Minneapolis Lakers, Cincinnati Royals).
- Eberhard Prüter, 69, German actor and voice actor.
- Ray Santisi, 81, American jazz pianist and composer.
- Michael Sata, 77, Zambian politician, President (since 2011), heart attack.
- Hans Schneider, 87, Austrian-born American mathematician and journal editor (Linear Algebra and its Applications), cancer.
- Clark S. Smith, 102, American politician.
- David Trendell, 50, British organist and musical director.
- Ava Carroll Waller, 87, American historic preservationist, First Lady of Mississippi (1972–1976), restored the Mississippi Governor's Mansion, Alzheimer's disease.
- Charlie Watkins, 91, British audio engineer (Watkins Electric Music).

=== 29 ===
- Alfred Biehle, 87, German politician.
- Don Bracken, 52, American football player (Green Bay Packers, Los Angeles Rams), staph infection.
- Alan Dawson, 82, Australian rules footballer.
- Frans De Bruyn, 90, Belgian Flemish writer.
- Frank Domínguez, 87, Cuban composer and pianist.
- Dennis Duncan, 71, Canadian football player, Parkinson's disease.
- Thomas Dupuy, 32, French boxer, killed.
- Roger Freeman, 48, American politician, member of the Washington House of Representatives, colon cancer.
- Rainer Hasler, 56, Liechtenstein footballer.
- Roderick M. Hills, 83, American lawyer and business executive, Chairman of the Securities and Exchange Commission (1975–1977), surgical complications.
- Klas Ingesson, 46, Swedish footballer (national team), multiple myeloma.
- Mary Jolliffe, 90, Canadian theatre publicist.
- H. Gary Morse, 77, American real estate developer (The Villages, Florida).
- Faiz Muhammad, 77, Pakistani Olympic wrestler.
- Rosa Posada, 74, Spanish politician.

=== 30 ===
- Elijah Malok Aleng, 77, South Sudanese public servant.
- Renée Asherson, 99, English actress (Caesar and Cleopatra, Henry V, The Others).
- Joe Brown, 85, English football player and manager (Burnley).
- Geoffrey Chamberlain, 84, Welsh academic.
- Geoffrey Clarke, 89, British artist.
- Xavier de Villepin, 88, French politician.
- Harcourt Dowsley, 95, Australian cricketer and football player.
- Juan Flavier, 79, Filipino politician, Secretary of Health (1992–1995), member of the Senate (1995–2007), multiple organ failure.
- John Forzani, 67, Canadian businessman and football player, heart attack.
- Bob Geigel, 90, American professional wrestler and promoter (Central States Wrestling), Alzheimer's disease.
- Lucy Gwin, 71, American disability rights activist.
- Ed Hoffman, 89, American football coach.
- Max Homer, 79, American politician, member of the Pennsylvania House of Representatives (1969–1974).
- Mohamed Sheikh Ismail, 50s, Somali military commander, Chief of the Police Force (2014).
- Amin Kamil, 90, Indian poet.
- Don W. King, 72, American writer and gay rights activist, pancreatic cancer.
- Thomas Menino, 71, American politician, Mayor of Boston (1993–2014), cancer.
- Andy Natowich, 95, American football player.
- Ida Elizabeth Osbourne, 98, Australian radio broadcaster, founder of the ABC's Argonauts Club.
- Ann Paludan, 86, British author.
- Clay Stapleton, 93, American football player and coach (Iowa State Cyclones).
- Christopher J. Turner, 81, British diplomat, Governor of the Turks and Caicos Islands (1982–1987) and Montserrat (1987–1990).

=== 31 ===
- David Manker Abshire, 88, American diplomat, Permanent Representative to NATO (1983–1987).
- Michael Alsbury, 39, American test pilot and engineer (Scaled Composites), spaceplane crash.
- Aden Robleh Awaleh, 72–73, Djiboutian politician.
- Tony Blake, 87, English footballer.
- José Manuel Briceño Guerrero, 85, Venezuelan writer, philologist and philosopher.
- Marina Cárdenas, 67, Nicaraguan bolero singer.
- Armando Cavazzuti, 85, Italian footballer.
- Ciguli, 57, Bulgarian Chalga singer.
- Pete Davis, 76-77, American archpriest.
- Carlos Duque, 84, Panamanian politician.
- Ian Fraser, 81, English composer and conductor (Scrooge, Christmas in Washington), cancer.
- Brad Halsey, 33, American baseball player (Oakland Athletics), climbing fall.
- Sir Henry Harris, 89, Australian cell biologist.
- Dick Hendley, 88, American football player (Pittsburgh Steelers).
- Käbi Laretei, 92, Estonian concert pianist.
- Mal MacDougall, 86, American advertising executive and speechwriter.
- Dollree Mapp, 91, American advocate, appellant in Mapp v. Ohio.
- Hitoshi Motoshima, 92, Japanese politician, Mayor of Nagasaki (1979–1995).
- Sofron Mudry, 90, Ukrainian Greek Catholic hierarch, Bishop of Ivano-Frankivsk (1997–2005).
- Walter H. North, 81, American politician, member of the Michigan Senate (1995–2002).
- Pat Partridge, 81, British football referee.
- Andrew P. Sage, 81, American systems engineer.
- Jim Sauter, 71, American stock car racing driver.
- Bibbi Segerström, 71, Swedish Olympic swimmer (1960).
- Renato Sellani, 88, Italian jazz pianist and composer.
- John V. Shields, 82, American chief executive (Trader Joe's).
- Noboru Tokita, 91, Japanese-born American scientist.
- Ross H. Trower, 92, American naval officer, Chief of Chaplains of the United States Navy (1979–1983).
