= Representative West =

Representative West may refer to:

- Absolom M. West, member-elect of the U.S. House
- Albert Benjamin West, member of the Rhode Island House
- Allen West (politician), member of the U.S. House
- Ben West Jr., member of the Tennessee House
- Benjamin West (New Hampshire lawyer), member-elect of the U.S. House
- Charles F. West (politician), member of the U.S. House
- Charles P. West, member of the Delaware House
- Charles S. West, member of the Texas House
- George West (American politician), member of the U.S. House
- James E. West (politician), member of the Washington House
- James I. West Jr., member of the Georgia House
- Joseph G. West, member of the Pennsylvania House
- Josh West (politician), member of the Oklahoma House
- Richard West (Missouri politician)
- Thomas F. West, member of the Florida House
- Thomas West (American politician), member of the Ohio House
- Tom West (Kansas politician)
- Walter T. West, member of the Oregon House
- William H. West (Louisiana politician)
- William Stanley West, member of the Georgia House
