= Don King (disambiguation) =

Don King (born 1931) is an American boxing promoter.

Don or Donald King may also refer to:

== Arts and entertainment ==
- Don King (musician) (born 1954), American singer, songwriter, guitarist, and trumpeter
- Don King (photographer) (born 1960), American photographer, cinematographer, and film director
- Don Roy King, American television director for Saturday Night Live
- Don W. King (1942–2014), American writer and gay rights activist

== Sports ==
- Don King (coach) (born 1926), American football player and coach
- Don King (defensive back) (born 1964), American football player
- Don King (defensive lineman) (1929–2014), American football player

== Others ==
- Donald King (lawyer) (1911–1997), British lawyer and bureaucrat
