= Orefici =

Orefici (Italian for "goldsmiths" [plural]) is an Italian surname. Notable people with the surname include:

- Giuseppe Orefici (1946–2025), Italian archaeologist
- Oscar Orefici (1946–2014), Italian sport journalist and writer

== See also ==
- Sant'Eligio degli Orefici, a church in Rome, Italy
- Orefice, a surname
