= Ametettai offensive =

2014 French forces offensive against Al-Qaeda in the Islamic Maghreb and Ansar Dine

- Part of Mali War
Date	October 28 – November 6, 2014
Location	Ametettai valley, Tigharghar, Mali
Result	French victory

Belligerents
France: Air Parachute Commando No. 10	AQIM; Ansar Dine

Strength
400 personnel 100 vehicles	30–200 fighters

Casualties and losses
1 killed 2 injured	24 killed 2 captured

Between October 26 and November 8, 2014, French forces of Operation Barkhane launched an offensive against jihadists from Al-Qaeda in the Islamic Maghreb and Ansar Dine in the area of Ametettai, rural Kidal Region. It was dubbed Operation Tudelle by French authorities.

== Background ==
Several months after the battle of Tigharghar, jihadists from Al-Qaeda in the Islamic Maghreb (AQIM) and Ansar Dine resettled the Ametettai valley, the main base of Malian AQIM and the main theater of the battle of Tigharghar. Between March 4 and 5, 2014, French forces carried out an air raid that killed eleven jihadists. In October 2014, French officials in Operation Barkhane decided to land French troops in Ametettai, in an operation dubbed Operation Tudelle. French forces gathered four hundred men and around a hundred vehicles, and estimated around 200 jihadists were present.

== Offensive ==
On the night between October 28 and 29, 2014 carried out a helicopter operation against jihadists in the valley. Fighting began at dawn, and around thirty jihadists were present. French forces, backed by aircraft and helicopters, lost one man but killed twenty jihadists in the clashes. The survivors retreated into the cave complex in Ametettai. Clashes continued sporadically throughout the night, but French forces claimed to have the advantage on the ground.

Clean-up operations saw further fighting on October 31, and French helicopters launched strikes on two other jihadist camps. The French army continued clean-up operations for a few days, with the offensive ending in early November.

== Aftermath ==
The first press release from the French Ministry of Defense claimed that twenty jihadists were killed or injured during the offensive. French forces suffered one dead and one injured, with the death being kickboxer Thomas Dupuy of Air Parachute Commando No. 10. One French soldier who was injured received surgery from his unit, and another who was injured quickly rejoined the battle.

On November 6, following the offensive's culmination, French authorities stated twenty-four jihadists were killed and two were captured. Several vehicles were destroyed, weapons were seized, and bombmaking equipment was seized.
