= Gavidia =

Gavidia is a surname. Notable people with the surname include:

- Estela Gavidia (fl. 1940s), Salvadoran gynaecologist
- Francisco Gavidia (1863–1955), Salvadoran historian, politician, educator and journalist
- Humberto Lara Gavidia (died 2014), Salvadoran baseball player
- José Luis Gavidia (born 1958), former Peruvian defense minister
