= Deborah Warren =

Deborah Warren may refer to:

- Deborah Warren (writer)
- Deborah Warren (actress)
