= Thomas Dupuy =

Thomas Dupuy may refer to:

- Thomas Acton (Jesuit) (1662–1721), real name Thomas Dupuy, English Jesuit
- Thomas Dupuy (kickboxer) (1982–2014), French Air Force adjutant and Thai boxer
