= Orefice =

Orefice (Italian for "goldsmith") is an Italian surname. Notable people with the surname include:

- Antonio Orefice (fl. 1708–1734), Italian composer
- Giacomo Orefice (1865–1922), Italian composer
- Lauren Orefice, American neuroscientist

== See also ==
- Orefici, people with this surname
