= Yoshikazu Sakamoto =

Japanese academic and writer

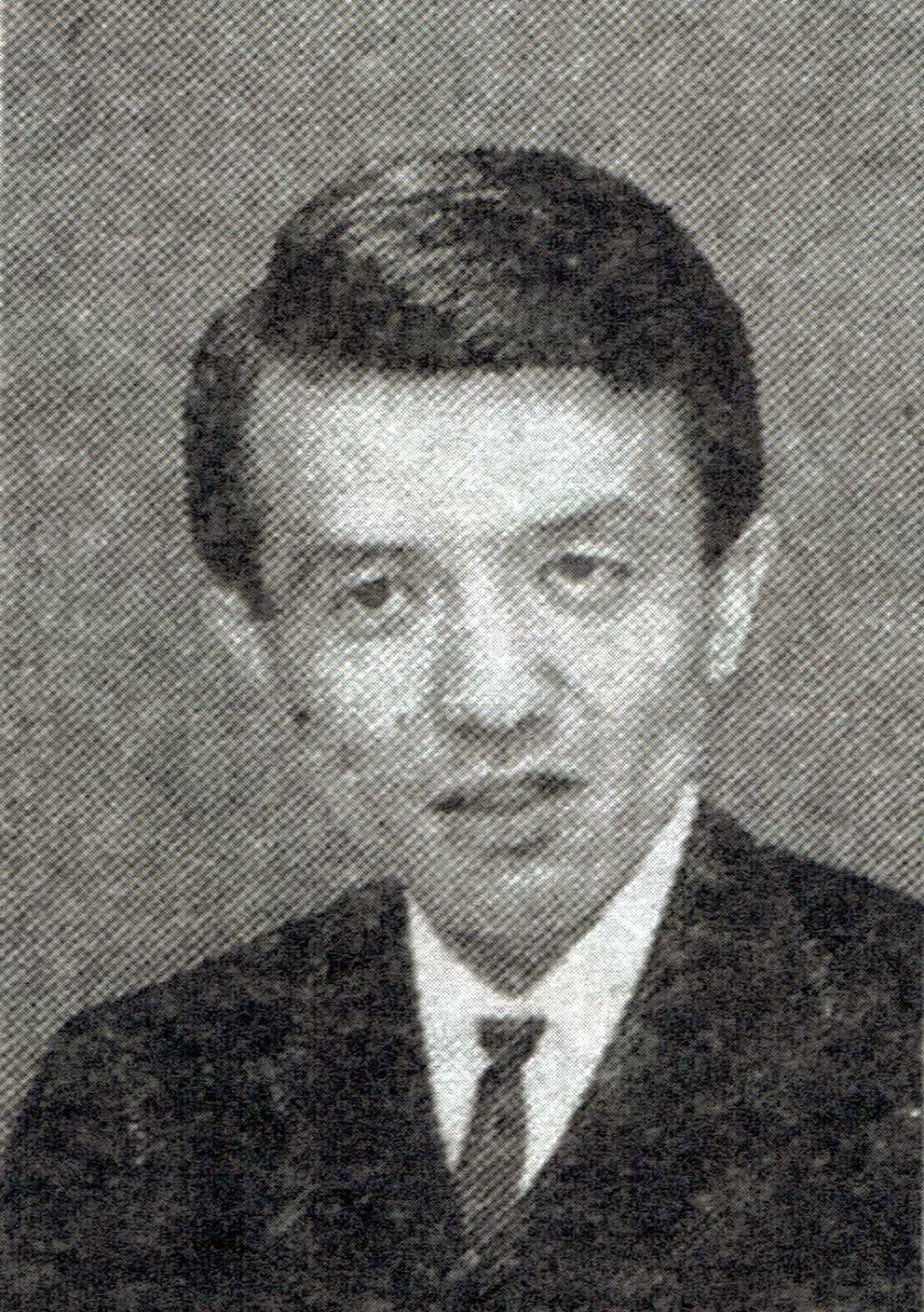
Sakamoto in 1961

Yoshikazu Sakamoto (坂本義和, Sakamoto Yoshikazu; September 16, 1927 – October 2, 2014) was a Japanese academic, writer, and professor emeritus at the University of Tokyo. Sakamoto, a leading proponent of pacifism during Japan's post-war period, has been credited as a pioneer of international political studies in the country.

In 1966, Sakamoto won the Yoshino Sakuzo Prize for his opinion piece, "Proposals for Japanese diplomacy," which called for the establishment of diplomatic relations between Japan and the People's Republic of China.

Sakamoto died at a hospital in Tokyo on October 2, 2014, at the age of 87.
