= Marina Cárdenas =

- La Gordita de Oro, circa 1991

Background information
- Born: Emma Marina Baltodano Espinales; 26 December 1946; Managua, Nicaragua
- Died: 31 October 2014 (aged 67) Managua, Nicaragua
- Genres: Bolero
- Occupation: Singer

Marina Cárdenas (1946–2014) was the stage name of Emma Marina Baltodano Espinales who was also called La Gordita de Oro (the Golden Chubby) or Queen of Nicaraguan bolero. She was a Nicaraguan bolero singer, who received more than 400 awards in her lifetime, including the Medal for Artistic Excellence from the Ministry of Culture of Nicaragua.

== Biography ==
Emma Marina Baltodano Espinales was born on 26 December 1946 in the neighborhood of La Tejera in Managua, Nicaragua to Victoria Espinales. She attended primary school at the Colegio “Evita Perón”, singing pastorals and studying with José Santamaría. She had an opportunity to go to university, but she decided to pursue singing. Her parents were not in favor of that career choice, until her sister intervened and helped her get a job for a radio performance on Radio Managua. After singing in several shows and winning several awards, her parents changed their views. By the early 1960s, she already had a following and in 1965 began appearing on television, performing at various networks, including Teleprensa, Channel 2 and Televicentro of Nicaragua. In 1967, the singer Luís Méndez heard her performance on a show for Latin music fans, produced by Gustavo Latino, on the New World Radio Exchange and Méndez named her the La Gordita de Oro, a nickname which she carried throughout her career.

She was instrumental in introducing Nicaraguan romantic music to the international community and was a symbol of Nicaraguan bolero in the 1970s and 1980s. At the height of her fame, she took a private plane to sing at the Irazu Hotel in San José, Costa Rica. Some of her best known recordings include Bienvenido a Nicaragua (Welcome to Nicaragua) by William Bendeck Olivella, La Minifalta by Carlos Mejía Godoy, various works by Ricardo Acosta for his productions with the group "Los Gatos de Costa Rica" (the cats of Costa Rica), and four songs written by the composer Róger Fischer Sánchez. In the 1980s, she recorded La gloria eres tú for the Sandinista Television System. Her last album, “Vivamos nuestro amor“ was released in April 2014, shortly before her death. She was "one of the most representative voices of the Nicaraguan song" and preferred to sing boleros, bossa nova and traditional music of Nicaragua.

She received more than 400 awards and honors for her artistry, including a tribute by President Anastasio Somoza Debayle held at the Teatro Nacional Rubén Darío, receipt of the Order of Salvador Cardenal from President Daniel Ortega and the Medal for Artistic Excellence from the Ministry of Culture, as the third recipient to ever receive the award.

Cárdenas died on 31 October 2014 and was buried beside her mother in the General Cemetery of Managua. An award, called the "Gordita de Oro" was instituted in her honor on the anniversary of her death to recognize artists or institutions which promote Nicaraguan art. The inaugural award winners were performers Nelson Aragón, Mauricio Rodríguez and Reynaldo Ruíz and teachers Frank Montiel and Miguel Ángel Tercero, of the Traditional Folkloric Ballet of Nicaragua.
