= Rajesh Sanghi =

Indian cricketer (1971–2014)

Personal information
- Born: 6 December 1971; Bombay, India
- Died: 4 October 2014 (aged 42); Maldives
- Source: Cricinfo, 6 April 2016

Rajesh Sanghi (6 December 1971 – 4 October 2014) was an Indian cricketer. He played four first-class matches for Rajasthan in 1993/94. He suffered a fatal heart attack while on holiday in the Maldives.
