= Pedrito el Drito =

Italian comic strip

- Genre: Humor/comedy

Creative team
- Created by: Antonio Terenghi

Pedrito el Drito is the title character of an Italian comic series created by Antonio Terenghi.

== Background ==
One of the most enduring characters in the history of Italian comics, Pedrito el Drito was created by Terenghi in 1952, making his first appearances as a naive cowboy in the appendix to comic books Forza John! and Rocky Rider. Promoted to sheriff, in 1953 his stories started being regularly published in the comic magazines Il Monello and Intrepido. In the 1990s the comic series was published in Corriere dei Piccoli and Lupo Alberto. In spite of its western setting, the series was built as a humorous family saga based on the typical characters of an aggressive wife and a henpecked husband.
