= Herman Mandui =

Herman Mandui (1969 – October 4, 2014) was a Papua New Guinean archaeologist who served as the Chief Archaeologist of Papua New Guinea from 2008 until his death in 2014. He has been regarded as a "pioneer of archeological research" in Papua New Guinea, having worked on sites such as the Kuk Swamp in Western Highlands Province and the early human settlement sites in the Ivane Valley of the Goilala District.
