= Marianne Sjöblom =

Finnish fencer

Personal information
- Born: 22 November 1933 Helsinki, Finland
- Died: 10 October 2014 (aged 80)

Sport
- Sport: Fencing

Marianne Sjöblom (22 November 1933 – 10 October 2014) was a Finnish fencer. She competed in the women's individual foil event at the 1952 Summer Olympics.
