= Tamar Ariel =

Israeli Air Force pilot

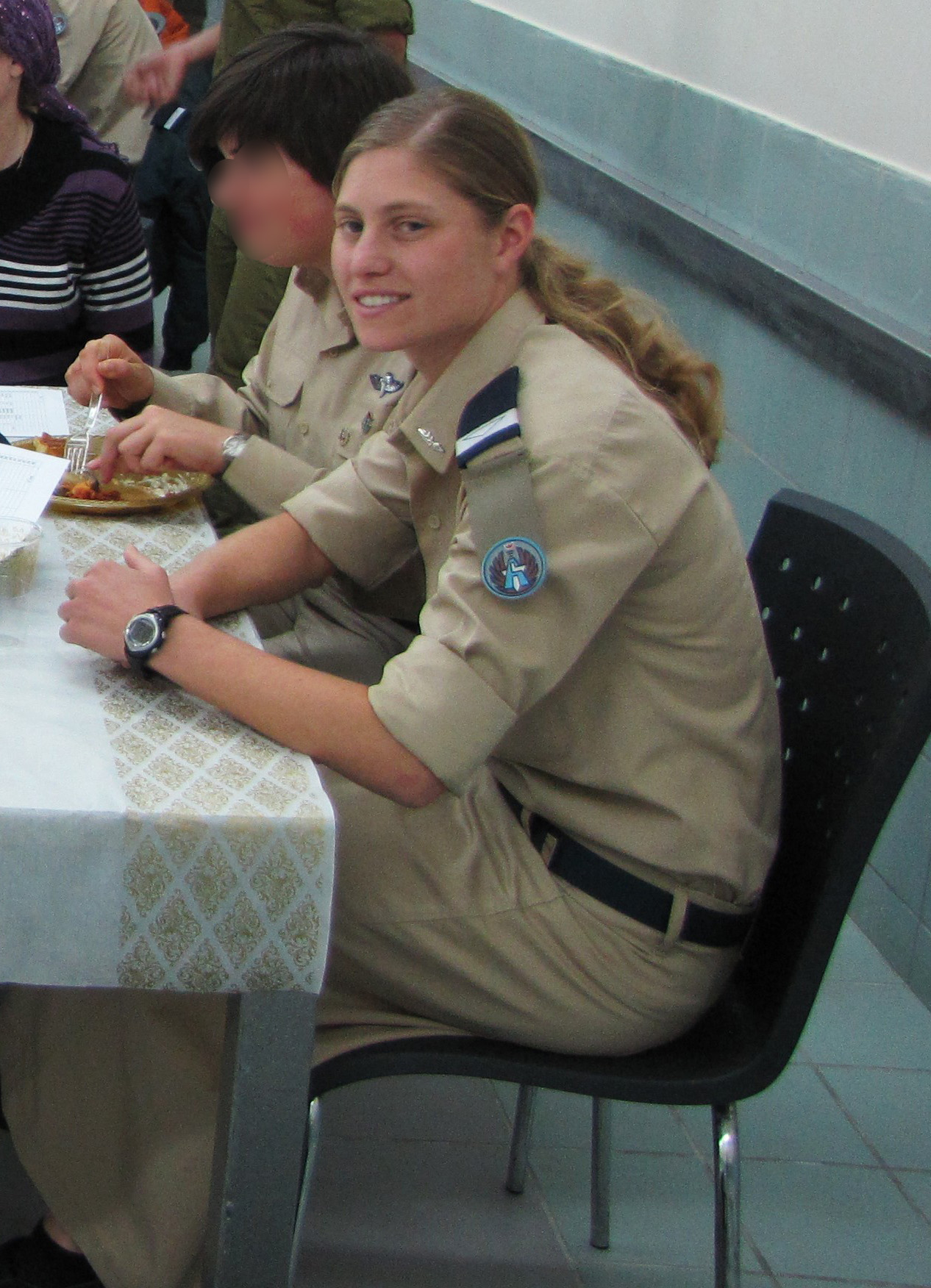
Tamar Ariel, 2012

Tamar Ariel (Hebrew: תמר אריאל; September 12, 1989 – October 14, 2014) was an Israeli Air Force navigator, Israel's first female Orthodox pilot. She died in a Himalayan blizzard in 2014, aged 25.

== Biography ==
Tamar Ariel was from Masu'ot Yitzhak, a cooperative farming community. Her father was born on the Moshav and her mother immigrated from Puerto Rico. Tamar was the third of six children.

Ariel graduated the Israel Air Force (IAF) flight school in December 2012. During her training she was forced to eject from her Beechcraft T-6 Texan II causing her to rocket skyward, breaking a vertebra in her back. Ariel spent months in an elastic body cast then went on to complete her training. After graduation, she flew the F-16D. During Operation Protective Edge, according to one of her commanders, she flew the most combat missions in her squadron.

Ariel died, aged 25, in a snow storm that hit the high mountain passes on a vacation to the Himalayas in 2014.
