= Seaborn Jones (poet) =

American poet

Seaborn Gustavus Jones (October 10, 1942 - October 3, 2014) was an American poet. He was the author of several books of poetry.

== Life and writing ==
Jones was born in Macon, Georgia on October 10, 1942 and died October 3, 2014. He was named after a family forebear, 19th-century Congressman Seaborn Jones.

He was educated in Macon public schools, attended Mercer University, and was a former United States Marine. At one time, Jones was Lighting and Technical Director for Mister Rogers' Neighborhood, was a certified zookeeper, and was a teacher of poetry in Macon and San Francisco.

Jones was published in the Chattahoochee Review, New York Quarterly, Pearl, River Styx, Rockhurst Review, Southern Poetry Review, Bogg, Poetry New Zealand, Studio One, Wilshire Review, Louisiana Review and numerous other journals, including translations of his work for European publications. His poems have been anthologized in 80 on the 80s (Ashland Poetry Press, 1990), Scorched Hands (Pariah Press), Chester H. Jones Foundation National Poetry Contest Winners 1993, and in Java Monkey Speaks Anthology 3 in 2008.

His published books of poetry include Drowning From the Inside Out, Lost Keys, X-Ray Movies, Black Champagne, Getaway Car in Reverse, and Going Farther into the Woods than the Woods Go, the latter nominated for the Pulitzer Prize in poetry.

Jones described his poems as "architectural," explaining: "I write down the mood or phrase in a notebook and build on it. Some poems seem to just roll out with no effort. I can only assume that these poems have been incubating in my unconscious and have percolated to the conscious. Everything requires rewriting."

I lean more toward Democritus' view that poetry is "traced to the poet's invocation with the Muse" than Pindar's view that "poetry is an acquired skill." My problem is that I don't know where my Muse is half the time. It's like being married to someone who says she's going to the store, then disappears for days only to return with no explanation, then wanders off again.

— Seaborn Jones, 2009.,

== Recognition ==
Seaborn Jones received the Georgia Author of the Year Award in poetry in 1998 for his book X-Ray Movies.

Jones received three International Merit Awards from Atlanta Review.

He won the Violet Reed Haas Prize for Poetry from Snake Nation Press, and was selected as the 1991 Alan Collins Scholar in Poetry at the Bread Loaf Writers' Conference.

Online magazine PoetryNet made him its Poet of the Month in July 2009.

He was selected as a Scholar by the Broadleaf Writers Association.

In 2010 Mercer University Press awarded him the Adrienne Bond Award for Poetry for his manuscript, Going Farther into the Woods than the Woods Go. The citation accompanying the award read: "Unlike any poet writing in the South, Seaborn Jones maintains a figurative connection to surrealism, one of the essential pathways of subjectivity in American Art."

== Publications ==
- Drowning from the Inside Out Cherry Valley, NY; Cherry Valley Editions, 1981. Afterword by William Dickey. ISBN 978-0-916156-52-7
- X-Ray Movies Georgia Arts Council, (1988/1998?)
- Lost Keys Valdosta, GA: Snake Nation Press, 1996. ISBN 978-0-9638364-4-1
- Getaway Car in Reverse Steam Iron Press, 2006. ISBN 978-1-4243-1520-8
- Black Champagne Middle Georgia College.
- Going Farther into the Woods than the Woods Go Mercer U P, 2011.

Except where noted, bibliographic information courtesy SeabornJones.com.

== Discography ==
- The Worlds of Seaborn Jones. (Spoken word audiobook) (Senate Records/Sociology Publishing, 2008)
