= Tarzanetto =

Italian comic series

- An Issue of Tarzanetto.
- Author: Antonio Terenghi
- Launch date: Chicchirichì (1954)
- End date: Tarzanetto (1980)
- Publisher(s): Chicchirichì (1954 – 1959); Corriere dei Piccoli (1974 – 1975); Edinational (1975 – 1979); Edizioni Bianconi (1979 – 1980)
- Genre(s): Humor, Jungle
- Original language: Italian

Tarzanetto is an Italian comic book series created by Antonio Terenghi and was first introduced in 1954. The series is a parody of Tarzan.

== History ==
A parody of Tarzan, Tarzanetto was created by Terenghi in 1954, with his stories published in the comics magazine Chicchirichì. A young, bald boy with cigar and bowler hat, Tarzanetto became soon the most popular character of the magazine, as to make the magazine renamed Chicchirichì presenta Tarzanetto. In 1959 the magazine was eventually renamed Tarzanetto until 1961.

After a long hiatus, in 1974 Terenghi reprised the character with new stories published in Corriere dei Piccoli. Following the audience's new interest for the character, in 1975 the comic book Tarzanetto back on newsstands, published by Edinational and, from 1979 until the definitive end of publications in 1980, by Edizioni Bianconi.
