= Jennifer McCrindle =

Scottish actress (1968–2014)

- Born: 9 September 1968; Scotland
- Died: 26 October 2014 (aged 46)
- Occupation: Actress

Jennifer McCrindle (19 September 1968 - 26 October 2014), also known as Jenny McCrindle, was a Scottish actress who died of multiple sclerosis in 2014. She is best known for her acting both in theatre and television and praised for her performances despite having dyslexia.

== Personal life ==
Jennifer McCrindle was born in 1968 in Glasgow, Scotland to mother Libby Robertson, and Father George McCrindle. She attended the Scottish Youth Theatre, going on to appear in various theatre productions.

As she was dyslexic, one of her greatest achievements was said to be learning lines, using various techniques to work around her difficulties.

== Professional works ==
Jennifer McCrindle was best known for her roles in Jute City (1991), Dream Baby (1989) and Your Cheatin’ Heart (1990). She is also known for her acting in Michael Boyd's Dumb-Struck at the Tron Theatre, Glasgow.

Jenny is said to be one of the most talented Scottish actresses of her generation, who could play both drama and high comedy with equal skill. She has worked with well known writers in Scotland, such as Ian Heggie, Irvine Welsh and Frank Deasy.
