= Shon Harris =

American writer

- Born: March 27, 1968
- Died: October 8, 2014 (aged 46)
- Employer: Logical Security
- Known for: Computer security and information security
- Website: https://web.archive.org/web/20141015074516mp_/https://logicalsecurity.com/shon-harris/

Shon Harris (March 27, 1968 – October 8, 2014) was an author of books and articles on topics related to information security, including study guides for Certified Information Systems Security Professional (CISSP) security certification examination. At the time of her death, over 1,000,000 copies of her books had been sold.

Harris was also an engineer in the United States Air Force Information Warfare Unit, an information security consultant, and the founder of information security training company LogicalSecurity.

Harris posthumously won the Information Systems Security Association's Hall of Fame award in 2015.

Updated editions of her CISSP books were published posthumously by McGraw-Hill in 2015 and 2016.

In 2015 Logical Security was acquired by former associates of Harris, and rebranded as Human Element. The company continues to offer training for CISSP based on the training curriculum designed by Harris.

The University of Texas offers the "Shon Harris Memorial Endowed Scholarship in Computer Science" to students in need.
