= Robert Kevin Ellis =

British-Australian businessman (1954–2014)

- Born: 1 April 1954
- Died: 20 October 2014 (aged 60); Ubud, Bali
- Cause of death: Murder
- Citizenship: United Kingdom; Australia
- Spouse: Julaikah Noor Aini (m. 1989)
- Children: 4

Robert Kevin Ellis was a British-Australian millionaire businessman who was murdered in Bali in 2014. His wife later confessed to having organised his murder.

== Life and career ==
Ellis spent his early life in Ōtara, New Zealand. He was raised there alongside his three siblings. He later moved to Australia. He met Julaikah Noor Aini in 1986 and they were married in 1989. They had two children, in addition to the two children from Ellis' former marriage.

The couple owned several businesses in Jakarta and Balo, including the telecommunications company PT Masindo Utama Nusantara and a diving company called Blue Fin.

== Murder ==
On 21 October 2014, Ellis' body was found wrapped in plastic and dumped in a ditch alongside a rice field. His throat had been slashed.

Forensics searched the couple's villa and car, finding a small amount of blood. Police found Aini watching television, and she did not seem shocked when police notified her that her husband's body had been found.

Aini confessed to organising the murder and hiring her maid's boyfriend Adrianus Ngongo to murder Ellis. She claimed that he was killed because he kept her in a state of poverty and refused to give her more than a $19 per month allowance. She also claimed that he had cheated on her and withheld sex.

Police arrested Adrianus Ngongo, who was carrying his share of the $A14,000 Aini had paid him and four accomplices for the murder. Police also arrested two maids who had kept the family's pet dogs quiet during the murder, before helping to clean up and move the body.

Aini was sentenced to 12 years in prison. Of the five men hired to commit the murder, three received 12-year prison sentences, and two received 15-year prison sentences.
