= Shin'ichi Okada =

Japanese architect (1928–2014)

- 岡田新一
- Born: January 9, 1928; Mito, Ibaraki, Japan
- Died: October 27, 2014 (aged 86); Bunkyo, Tokyo, Japan
- Education: University of Tokyo; Yale University (postgraduate)
- Notable work: Supreme Court of Japan building
- Website: www.sites.os-a.co.jp

Shin'ichi Okada (9 January 1928 – 27 October 2014), also spelled as Shinichi Okada, was a Japanese architect active in the second half of the twentieth century. He was particularly known for designing schools, hospitals, museums, and government buildings.

== Career ==
Okada was born in Mito, Ibaraki, near the main factory of Hitachi, which was founded by his grandfather Namihei Odaira. His father, Tsuneyoshi Okada [ja], was a senior bureaucrat at the Home Ministry who served as Governor of Tokushima and Hokkaido.

Following in his father and grandfather's footsteps, he attended the University of Tokyo, graduating in 1955. He stayed at the university for two extra years after that to do his master's degree in architecture. He started working at Kajima in 1957. He later attended Yale University to do his second postgraduate degree, graduating in 1963. He won a competition and was commissioned to build the new Supreme Court of Japan building, upon which he set up his own company, Okada Associates. His other notable works include the Metropolitan Police Headquarters, Okayama Orient Museum, the University of Tokyo Hospital's high-rise complex, and Miyazaki Prefectural Art Museum.

He died on 27 October 2014.

== Works ==
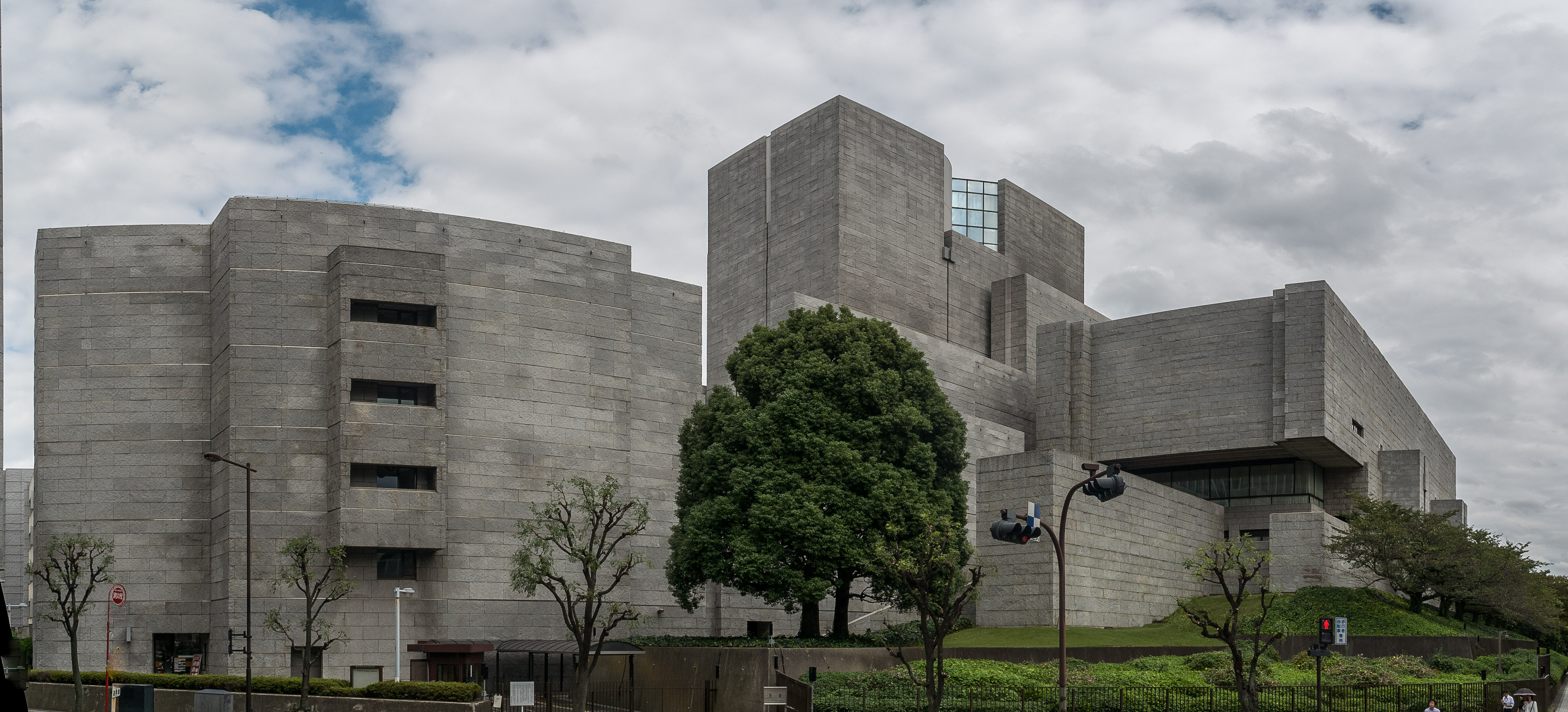
Supreme Court of Japan, 1974

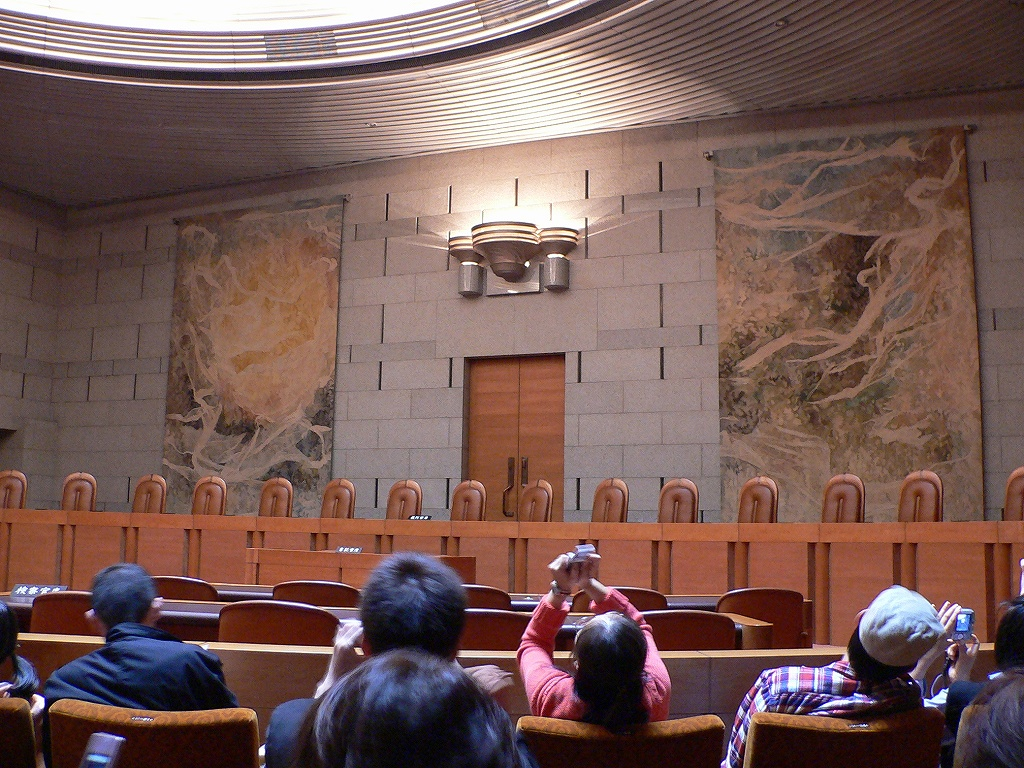
Grand Bench, Supreme Court of Japan

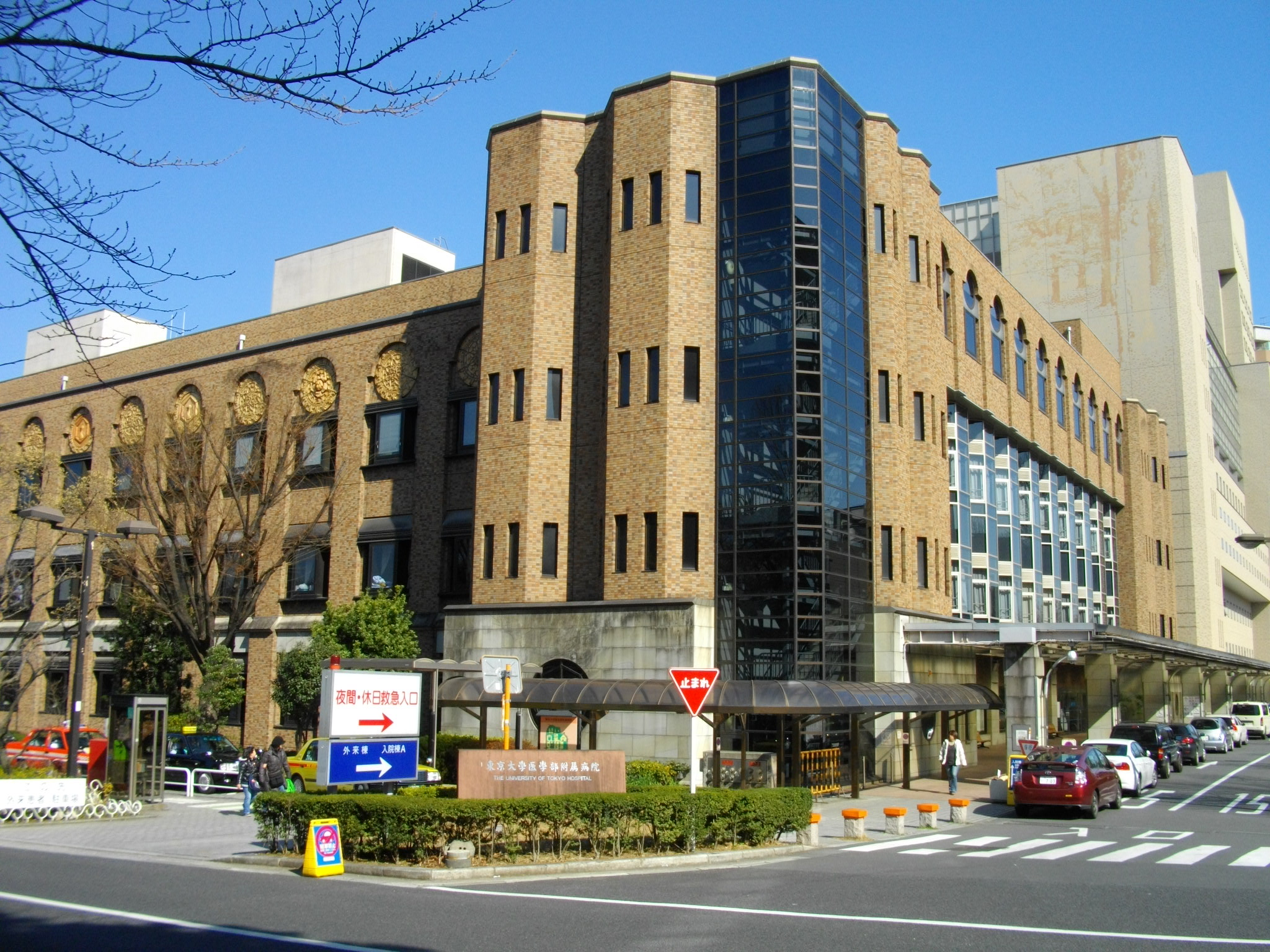
University of Tokyo Hospital, 1982

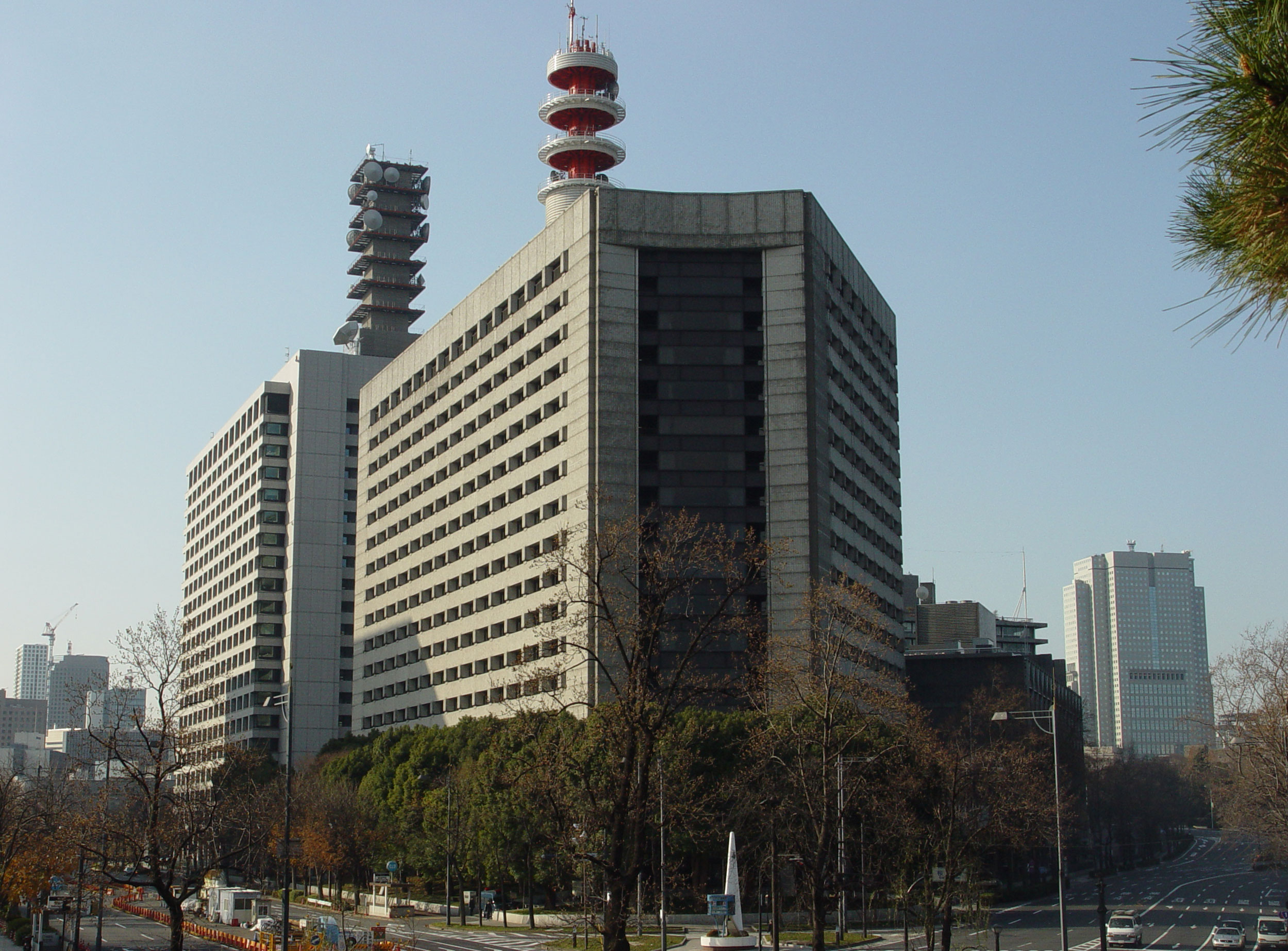
Metropolitan Police headquarters, 1980

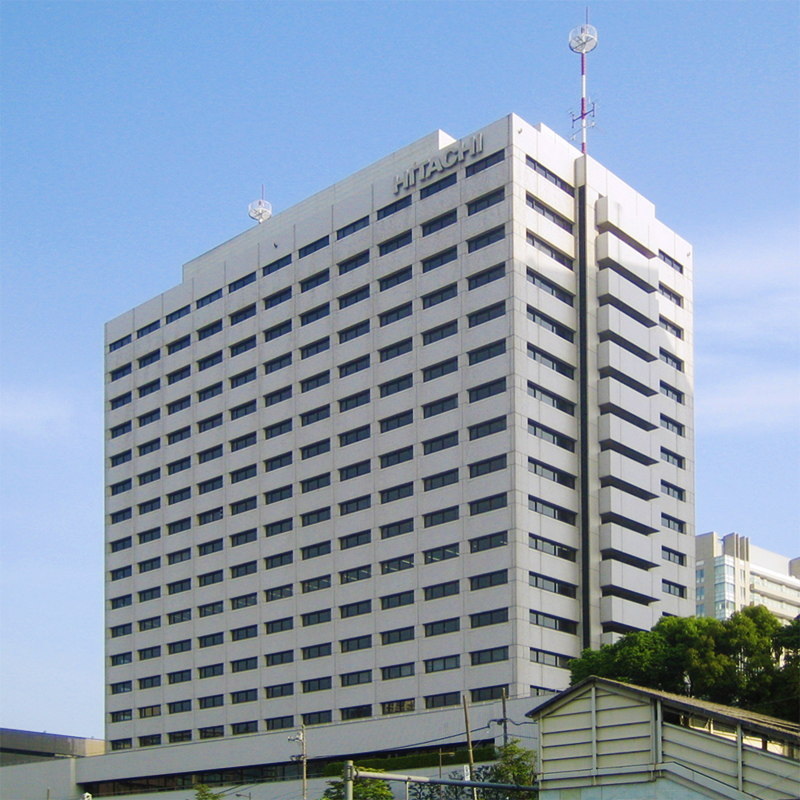
Former Hitachi headquarters, 1983

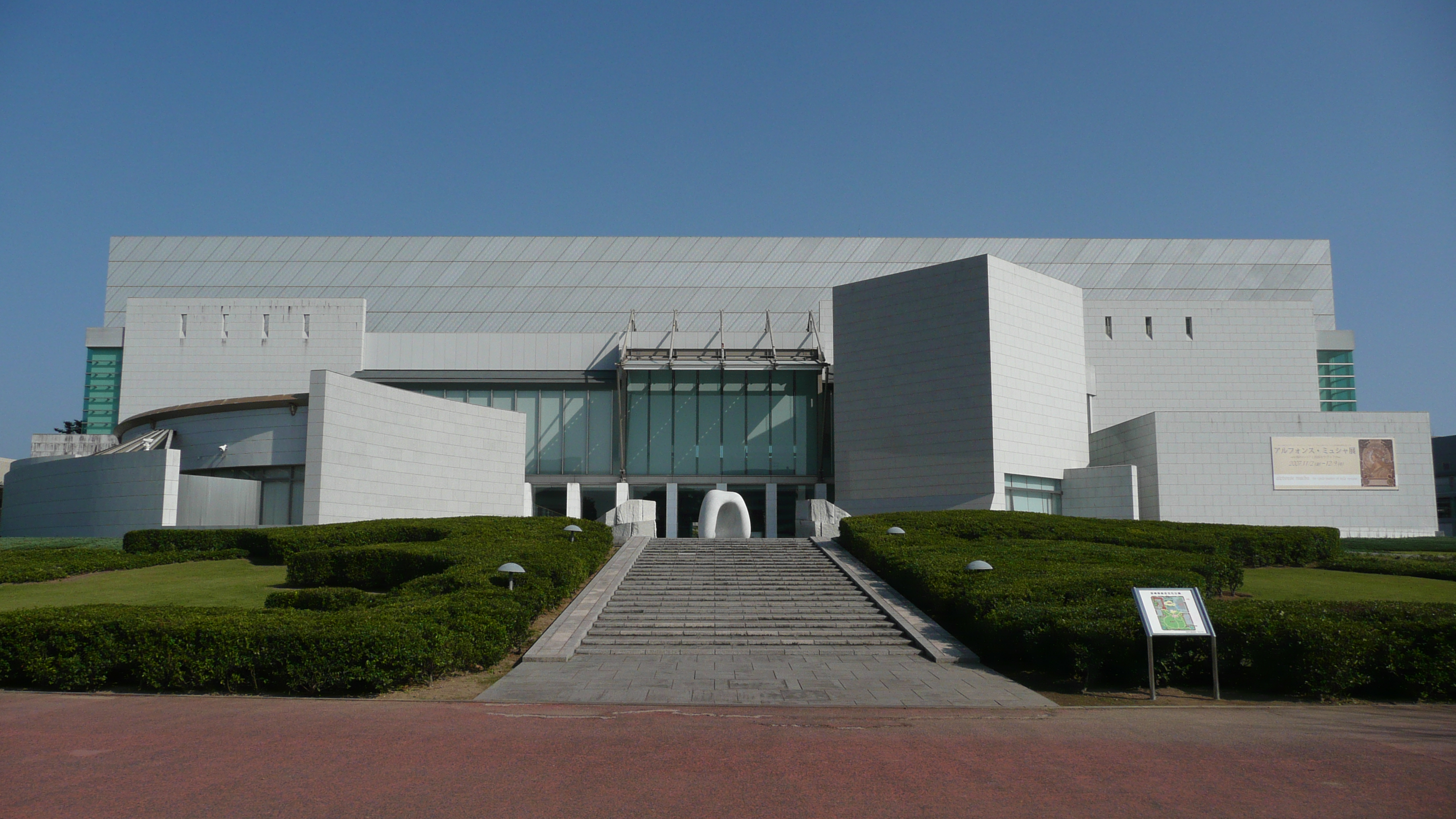
Miyazaki Prefectual Art Museum, 1995
