= Bob Dawson (television host) =

American television personality

- Born: Robert Wayne Dawson; May 9, 1924; Des Moines, Iowa, U.S.
- Died: October 20, 2014 (aged 90); Eau Claire, Wisconsin, U.S.
- Other name: Sheriff Bob
- Education: Drake University (BA); American Institute of the Air
- Occupations: Children's television presenter, actor, television producer, meteorologist
- Years active: 1954–2014
- Spouse: Margaret
- Children: 2

Robert Wayne Dawson (May 9, 1924 – October 20, 2014), or "Sheriff Bob", was an American television personality, meteorologist, and producer. Dawson was famous for creating and hosting the children's television series Sheriff Bob, which featured his kind-hearted personality and direct connection to his young audiences. The program aired from 1954 until 1978.

== Early and personal life ==
Dawson was born in Des Moines, Iowa on May 9, 1924, the son of Leland Wayne and Lillian Opal Dawson. After high school he attended Drake University and the American Institute of the Air, studying Radio Broadcasting. Dawson served his country in the U.S. Army during World War II as an Artillery Sergeant, where he received the Bronze Star.

Throughout the years, Dawson worked a variety of jobs. Following the war, he worked as the morning DJ at KCBC and as an on-air announcer at KGTV in Des Moines. He later moved to Eau Claire where he worked at WEAU for 24 years, then in public relations at the Eau Claire Consumer's Cooperative for 11 years. Dawson worked for a short time at Luther Hospital and was elected to serve on the Eau Claire County Board for several years.

== Television career ==
In 1954, Dawson began working at WEAU, a Wisconsin television station. Dawson was the meteorologist during newscasts. Dawson created the Sheriff Bob program for the station in 1954. The show ran for about 25 years and featured a live studio audience of children. Dawson also visited children in area hospitals, boosting their spirits and making them smile.

== Death and honors ==
Dawson died in 2014 at the age of 90. He is interred at Rest Haven Cemetery. In 2007, the Eau Claire County Board recognized Dawson and named him 'Honorary Sheriff.' A documentary was produced about Sheriff Bob's life and aired on public television stations.
