= Margaret Helen Harper =

American computer programmer

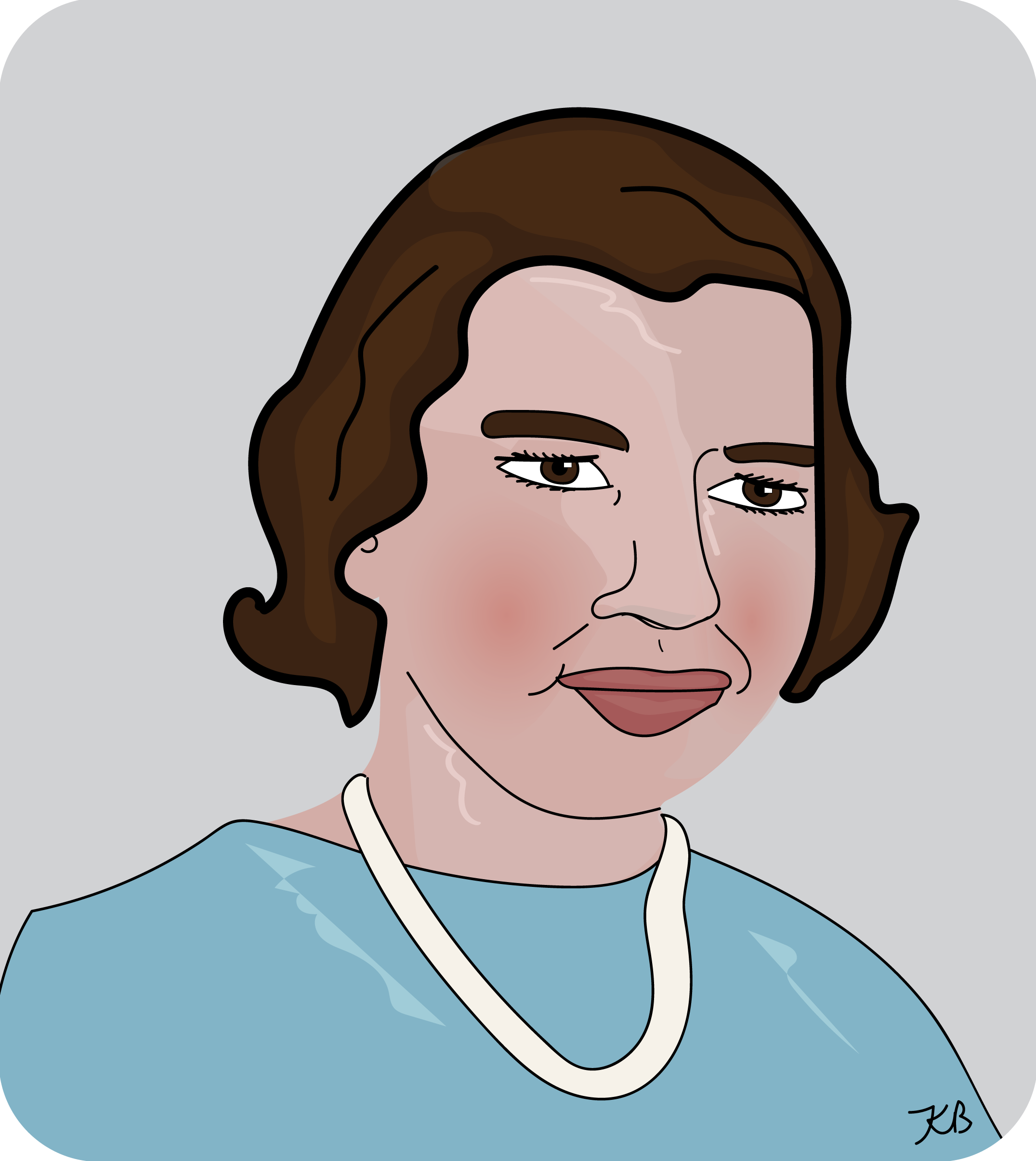
- Digital drawing of Margaret H. Harper (Approx. Age 21)
- Born: 9 February 1919; Michigan
- Died: 13 October 2014 (aged 95); Pennsylvania
- Education: Wellesley College; University of Pennsylvania (BS)
- Occupation: Computer Programmer
- Parents: Paul Harper (b. 1892) (father); Katharine Harper (b. 1893) (mother)
- Relatives: Richard Irving Harper (1927-1977) (adopted brother)

Margaret Helen Harper (9 February 1919 - 13 October 2014) was an American computer programmer who worked with Grace Hopper at Remington Rand to develop one of the first computer compilers. Harper was born in Michigan, but lived most of her life in Pennsylvania. She attended Wellesley College and graduated from the University of Pennsylvania in 1940. She worked as a programmer and then as a professor.

== Early life and education ==
Harper was born in Michigan, but grew up in Pennsylvania. Her parents were Paul Harper (b. 1892) and Katharine Harper (b. 1893). Paul worked at an auto dealership, and Katharine was a musician and a stay-at-home mother. Margaret had an adopted younger brother named Richard Irving Harper (13 March 1927 - November 1977). Margaret was encouraged in her studies as a child, but she lamented that she wasn't very artistic. Margaret attended both public and private schools before her college years. For college, Margaret first attended Wellesley College, but then transferred to the University of Pennsylvania. Margaret was active in sports, and played on the Wellesley College and University of Pennsylvania women's hockey teams. Margaret graduated in 1940 with a Bachelor of Science from the University of Pennsylvania's School of Education where she studied chemistry.

== Career ==
It is not clear how Harper got involved in computer science, but by the 1950s she was working as a developer.

Computer science is by and large a discipline of collaboration, and the development process in the late 1940s and early 1950s was no different in that respect. In the early 1950s when Grace Hopper was developing the first compilers, she was aided by Harper and Richard K. Ridgway. Hopper even stated that "this work is necessarily group research, and this account cannot be published without citing those members…primarily responsible for the achievement of these results". This is important to note, because much of Harper's contribution has been overshadowed by the Matilda Effect of Grace Hopper's fame. In 1952, Harper, Ridgway, and Hopper were all working at Remington Rand on the A series of compilers for the UNIVAC system. Specifically, Harper and Ridgway prepared the manual for and worked on the A-2 compiler.

Harper also published her article "Subroutines: Prefabricated Blocks for Building" in the March 1954 issue of Computers and Automation. In her article, Harper starts off by saying how the 1950s computer programmer has essentially been like a "settler in America" who must make every bit of his house by hand, right down to the pegs that hold the house together! She continues by noting that the times have changed, and now programmers are working together not from the fine pegs of a house, but by using the tools and ideas that others discovered in the past. She stresses the importance of subroutines in computer programming—the idea that larger tasks can be broken down into smaller (sub) segments—but goes on to note that "the absence of a compiler [for subroutines] has meant that subroutines have been coded to function only in a fixed portion of the computer's storage or memory." This was problematic, because it meant that a lot of code was simply not reusable. The computers that we know and recognize today (in the 2000s) could not function without this reusable code. But in 1954 Harper had the foresight to ask, "If Russian can be translated into English…why not one computer code into another?" This was the crux of the issue with in the idea of compiler design and implementation. Although Harper did not invent the compiler, she was a part of one of the earliest teams of scientists who would imagine and build the first compilers. The New Scientist from 17 September 1987 states that one of the first people to implement the new compilers was Harper.

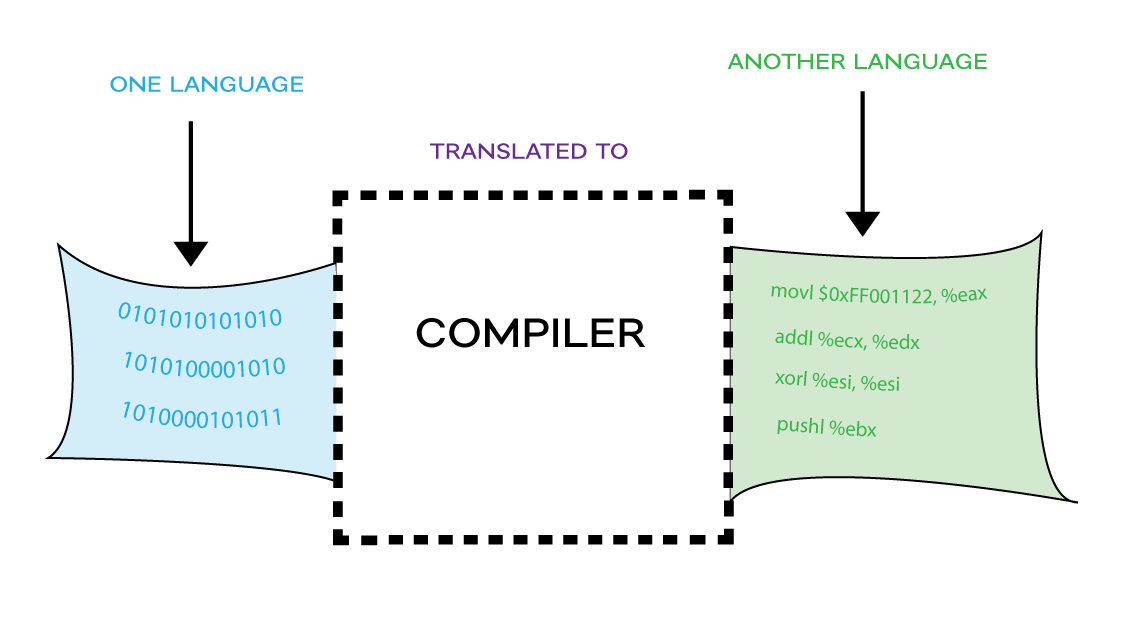
Basic Idea of a Compiler

After Harper finished work with Hopper and Ridgway at Remington Rand, she continued as a programming analyst at Auerbach Corporation in the 1960s. She was among those listed in the Who's Who in the Computer Field for 1963-64 and the Who's Who in Computers and Data Processing for 1971. After working for Auerbach, she taught at the university of a Pennsylvania and later retired.

She died in 2014 in Pennsylvania at the age of 95.
