= Gajanan Kathaley =

Indian cricketer (1946–2014)

Personal information
- Born: 22 November 1946; Nagpur, India
- Died: 24 October 2014 (aged 67); Nagpur, India
- Source: ESPNcricinfo, 7 September 2016

Gajanan Kathaley (22 November 1946 – 24 October 2014) was an Indian cricketer. He played four first-class matches for Vidarbha between 1972 and 1974.
