= Paul Muenzer =

Mayor of Naples, Florida
- In office 1992–1996
- Preceded by: Kim Anderson
- Succeeded by: Bill Barnett

Personal details
- Born: February 26, 1932; Elmore, Ohio
- Died: October 14, 2014 (aged 82); Naples, Florida
- Political party: Republican
- Spouse: Barbara Muenzer
- Profession: Education

Paul W. Muenzer (February 26, 1932 – October 14, 2014) was an American school administrator and politician who served as the 12th Mayor of the city of Naples, Florida, from 1992 until 1996. He has been credited with cleaning up the city's governments during his tenures as Mayor and a member of the Naples City Council. Muenzer, who was a former high school principal, was a member of the Republican Party.

== Biography ==
Paul Muenzer was born in Elmore, Ohio, on February 26, 1932, to Frank and Marie Muenzer. He graduated from Elmore High School and obtained a bachelor's degree from Miami University. Muenzer, who grew to 6 foot 4 inches and approximately 280 pounds, played football for the Miami Redskins (now known as the Miami RedHawks) while in college. Meunzer then obtained a master's degree in education from Bowling Green State University.

=== Career ===
Muenzer began his career as a teacher at schools in Oak Harbor, Ohio, from 1954 to 1959 and Maumee, Ohio, from 1959 to 1969.

In 1969, Muenzer and his family moved from Ohio to Naples, Florida, to accept a new position as an assistant principal of discipline at Naples High School, where he worked from 1969 to 1973. He then served as principal of Gulfview Middle School, also in Naples, from 1973 to 1983. Muezner was eventually promoted to facilities planner of the Collier County School District, which he held from 1983 to 1988.

=== Naples city government ===
Muenzer resigned from his job with the Collier County School District in 1988 to run as a candidate for Naples City Council. At the time, the city council was considering a proposal which would have extended the city's commercial zoning area into Muenzer's Sixth Street North neighborhood. He decided to run for office after being denied the opportunity to speak on the issue at a city council meeting. According to his daughter, Mary Reeve, "By the time he walked from City Hall back to our house [from that meeting], he had decided he was going to run for council and fix things."

Muenzer was elected to the city council in 1988. During his tenure on the city council, Muenzer and other council members uncovered approximately one million dollars in Naples city funds said to be "forgotten" in an account in Jacksonville Bank. Muenzer also uncovered a pattern of bribery at City Dock in downtown Naples and discovered nearly 2,500 broken water meters in the city. The investigation and controversy surrounding the broken water meters resulted in the resignation of both then Naples Mayor Rudd Crawford and City Manager Frank Jones in 1991.

In 1992, Muenzer, a Republican, was elected unopposed as Mayor of Naples. In a 1996 interview with the Naples Daily News, he listed his attempts to crack down on crime in the River Park neighborhood of Naples as both his biggest accomplishment and disappointment as mayor. Mayor Muenzer and the city pressured rental property owners to make improvements by issuing code citations. He also partnered with landlords to strengthen the rules and punishments for tenants in the neighborhood's apartment buildings. His moves received some criticism, but Muenzer retained the new policies.

Paul Muenzer served one four-year term as mayor from 1992 to 1996. He retired from office in 1996 and was succeeded by incoming Mayor Bill Barnett. He declined ensuing offers to run for the Collier County commissioner, citing a desire to spend more time with his grandchildren and retire from politics.

In addition to city politics, Muenzer was a member of the Southwest Florida Regional Planning Board from 1988 to 1996, including a stint as its chairman from 1995 to 1996.

Muenzer died at his home in Naples, Florida, from pancreatic and liver cancer on October 14, 2014, at the age of 82. His death was announced during a Naples City Council meeting the next day. He had been diagnosed with pancreatic cancer several months before. He was survived by his wife, Barbara Muenzer; three children, Dean Muenzer, Mary Reeve and Joanne Muenzer; and three grandchildren. He was buried in the Naples Memorial Gardens.

Political offices
Preceded by Kim Anderson	Mayor of Naples, Florida; 1992–1996	Succeeded by Bill Barnett
