= Orde van den Prince =

Flemish-Dutch organization

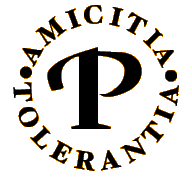
Orde van den Prince

The Orde van den Prince or Order of the Prince is a Flemish-Dutch society for the promotion of the language and culture of the Dutch-speaking Low Countries (Flanders and Netherlands). Each month members meet on fixed locations, except during summer.

== History ==
The organization was founded in November 1955, by the lawyer Guido van Gheluwe from Kortrijk. The name of the society is derived from William the Silent. He was chosen because of his role in the history of the Netherlands and its tolerance (relative to the standards of his time). The logo of the Orde van den Prince is the capital letter P, surrounded by the words Amicitia (friendship) and Tolerantia (tolerance).

The organization shows a steady increase in membership and now consists of 93 departments: 54 in Flanders, 4 in Wallonia, 29 in the Netherlands and 6 in other countries. Membership, currently almost 3,000, is by invitation only.

== See also ==
- De Warande, Flemish business club

== Sources ==
- Puype, Jan, De elite van België, Van Halewyck, Leuven, 2004 ISBN 90-5617-507-6
