= Richard Stretch =

South African cricketer (1952–2014)

Personal information
- Born: 26 November 1952; Graaff-Reinet, South Africa
- Died: 27 October 2014 (aged 61); Port Elizabeth, South Africa
- Source: Cricinfo, 1 April 2016

Richard Stretch (26 November 1952 – 27 October 2014) was a South African cricketer. He played fourteen first-class matches for Border between 1979 and 1982.

After retirement from cricket he became one of the world's leading researchers into cricket injury. Some of his major publications related to definitions of cricket injuries, injuries in cricket in South Africa, batting biomechanics, and lumbar stress fractures.
