= Herbert Eiteljörge =

German footballer

Personal information
- Date of birth: 27 November 1934
- Date of death: 2 October 2014 (aged 79)
- Position: Goalkeeper

Senior career*
Years	Team	Apps	(Gls)
1953-1955	Duisburger SpV		(-)
1955-1969	SC Preußen Münster		(-)

Managerial career
- Lüner SV
- * Club domestic league appearances and goals

Herbert Eiteljörge (27 November 1934 – 2 October 2014) was a German goalkeeper.

== Career ==
Eiteljörge began his career in 1953 at Duisburger SpV. After Duisburger's promotion to the Oberliga West, he played 20 games for the club during the 1954/55 season. After that, he signed for SC Preußen Münster. After one season, Eiteljörge featured in almost every game and completed a further 184 games in the Oberliga.

After the Bundesliga was established, which Preußen Münster had qualified for, Eiteljörge was still the first-choice goalkeeper and played in 26 of the 30 Bundesliga games that season for Preußen. The other four games saw Dieter Feller play. Neither of them was able to prevent the team's relegation.

Subsequently, Herbert Eiteljörge featured in 40 games in the Regionalliga West. Until 1969, he was a part of the Münster team.

After his active career, he coached Lüner SV among others and was the referee's supervisor for SC Preußen Münster.
