= George Giokas =

Canadian football player

Profile
- Position: Halfback

Personal information
- Born: February 18, 1924; Regina, Saskatchewan
- Died: October 7, 2014 (aged 90); Calgary, Alberta

Career history
- 1947–1949: Regina Roughriders

George Giokas (February 18, 1924 – October 7, 2014) was a Canadian professional football player who played for the Regina Roughriders. He played high school football at Regina High School.
