= Amildo Morales =

Guatemalan politician (1938–2014)

- Born: 17 April 1938; Jalapa, Guatemala
- Died: 10 October 2014 (aged 76); Jalapa, Guatemala
- Occupation: Politician
- Political party: Patriotic Party

Amildo de Jesús Morales Rodríguez (17 April 1938 – 10 October 2014) was a Guatemalan politician. He was elected as member of the Congress of Guatemala in 2011 then representing the Nationalist Change Union. In 2012 he affiliated to the Patriotic Party.

In the morning of 10 October 2014 Morales was severely injured when a bull of his property attacked him in one of his farms in Jalapa. He died hours later.
