= Mal MacDougall =

Malcolm “Mal” MacDougall (21 August 1928 – 31 October 2014) was a prominent speechwriter and creative director from the advertising industry. He developed several high-profile advertising campaigns in the 1980s and 1990s, including Diet Coke's “Just for the Taste of It,” and successful campaigns for Revlon, Heineken, Titleist, Procter & Gamble, BMW and the State of Israel. His campaigns have won more than 100 awards worldwide, including multiple Clios, One Show Awards and Effies. He served as president and creative director at Christy MacDougall Mitchell, at Humphrey Browning MacDougall, at Lintas, at Ally & Gargano and at Hill, Holliday. Most recently, he was Executive Creative Director with New York-based ad agency Bodden Partners.

MacDougall also worked as a speechwriter and political communications strategist. He oversaw political advertising for Gerald Ford’s 1976 presidential campaign and the “Vote Republican. For a Change.” campaigns in 1980 and 1982. Some of his notable speeches include President Ford’s acceptance of the Republican Presidential nomination; the centennial address for the president of The Coca-Cola Company in 1987 and the Atlanta Olympic Committee’s successful presentations to the International Olympic Committee. He wrote speeches for the CEOs of Fortune 500 companies in his position as a founding partner of Prides Crossing Executive Communication, LLC, a New York-based corporate communications firm.

MacDougall is the author of We Almost Made It an account of his experiences on the Ford campaign, and The Kingmaker, a political novel. His many articles on marketing and advertising appeared in Newsweek, Adweek, New York Magazine and other publications. In 1980, he became the first inductee to the New England Advertising Hall of Fame. He is a graduate of Harvard University. He died on 31 October 2014 in New York City due to complications of cancer. He wrote an article for The Daily Beast, posthumously published, describing how the decisions of his health insurance company contributed to his death.

== Works ==
- Malcolm D. MacDougall (1977), We Almost Made It, New York: Crown, ISBN 0-517-52933-5 .
