= Ronnie Spafford =

British soldier and philatelist

Ronnie Spafford, around 1972.

Major Ronald Norman Spafford (29 July 1928 – 6 October 2014), known as Ronnie Spafford, was a British army officer and philatelist who was an expert in the stamps and postal history of the Falkland Islands and developed a deep interest in those islands.

== Early life ==
Spafford was born in Bristol, but due to bombing during the Second World War the family moved to nearby Weston-super-Mare, where Spafford had his home for the rest of his life. Spafford was educated at Sherborne School in Dorset and originally intended to become an artist, which horrified his parents. Instead he was called up to do his National Service in the Army which equally horrified Ronnie. He graduated from the Royal Military Academy Sandhurst, found that he enjoyed the military life and decided to become a career soldier, serving in the Royal Artillery and rising to the rank of Major.

== Philately ==
Spafford had collected stamps as a child and decided to rekindle his interest while he was in the Army when he saw a colleague arranging his collection. He selected the Falkland Islands because it was possible to complete a collection of the basic stamps of the islands. When he had done that he moved on to more specialised philately. He was vice-president and co-founder of the Falkland Islands Philatelic Study Group and in 1980 he was an adviser to the BBC television series In the Post, made in Bristol. In 2009, The London Philatelist erroneously reported Spafford's death, causing a correction to be published in the next issue. Spafford was said to have taken the incident with good humour.

== Philatelic awards ==
- Gold medal for his display of Falkland Islands 1842-1946 at Capex '96 in Toronto.
- Large vermeil medal at Ilsapex 98.
- Large vermeil medal at The Stamp Show 2000.
- Roland Michener Medal, of The Royal Philatelic Society of Canada Philatelic Research Foundation.

== Association with the Falkland Islands ==
Introduced to the Falklands through their stamps, Spafford first visited the islands in 1977 and was there again on the eve of the Argentine invasion in 1982. He was a passionate defender of the islands and their way of life and held a number of positions related to the Falklands. He was vice-president of the Falkland Islands Association, the military member of the Falkland Islands Emergency Committee set up to lobby the British government on the sovereignty issue, and a trustee and former chairman of Falklands Conservation. In his later years he ran trips to the islands through his business Falklands Experience.

== Selected publications ==
- The 1933 Centenary Issue of the Falkland Islands. Picton Publishing, 1972; ISBN 0902633139.
- Harry Hayes (ed.), The Falkland Islands Philatelic Digest, No. 2, 1979.
- "Jeremiah Thomas Fitzgerald Callaghan CMG, Governor of the Falkland Islands 1876–1880", The Falkland Islands Journal, 1994.
- "Falkland Islands Philately: The Earliest Days", The Canadian Philatelist, July/August 1999.
