= Imre Pichler =

Hungarian politician (1947–2014)

Member of the National Assembly
- In office 14 May 2010 – 5 May 2014
- In office 15 May 2002 – 15 May 2006

Personal details
- Born: 22 January 1947 Szigetvár, Hungary
- Died: 19 October 2014 (aged 67) Szigetvár, Hungary
- Party: Fidesz (2005–2014)
- Other political affiliations: MDF (1989–2004)
- Children: Anett; Cseperke
- Profession: teacher, politician

Imre László Pichler (22 January 1947 – 20 October 2014) was a Hungarian teacher and politician, member of the National Assembly (MP) for Szigetvár (Baranya County Constituency VII) from 2002 to 2006 and from 2010 to 2014.

== Biography ==
He finished Zrínyi Miklós Secondary School at Szigetvár in 1965. He graduated from the Teacher Training College of Pécs in 1973. He took up employment in Dencsháza as a primary school teacher of biology and PE in 1973, then spent two years in Primary School No. 1 of Szigetvár. He was a PE teacher in the No. 509. (later renamed as Török Bálint) Vocational and Secondary Technical Institute of Szigetvár from 1976. Parallel to his job he graduated from the Physical Education College of Budapest in 1983, after two years of studies. He was elected headmaster of the Vocational and Secondary Technical Institute in 1993. He was the chief manager of two institutions that merged, the Zrínyi Miklós Secondary School and the Vocational and Secondary Technical Institute and Hostel, from 2000. He obtained qualification as a public education manager from Janus Pannonius University of Pécs in 2000. He had been member of the Baranya County Association of Physical Education Teachers since 1985.

He joined the Szigetvár branch of the Hungarian Democratic Forum (MDF) in 1989. In the local elections of September–October 1990 he was elected into the General Assembly of Szigetvár as an individual candidate. He was active as a member of the Education and Sport Committee. He was a local individual representative from December 1994 to October 1998, and member of the sport committee. During the 2002 parliamentary election he was elected individual MP, representing Szigetvár (Constituency VII, Baranya County). He had been on the Education and Science Committee between May 15, 2002, and May 15, 2006. He also worked in the Committee on Social and Family Affairs until December 20, 2004. He was elected to the assembly of Szigetvár on 20 October 2002. On 21 June 2004, shortly after the European Parliament election, he joined the Lakitelek Working Group established at the time, led by Sándor Lezsák. This group, among them Pichler left the MDF parliamentary group on November 8, 2004. He became an independent MP until May 15, 2005, when joined the Fidesz parliamentary group.

Pichler was an individual MP candidate for Szigetvár in the 2006 parliamentary election, however lost to József Paizs, the Mayor of Szigetvár. Four years later, he was elected to the National Assembly for a second term as member of the Fidesz. He served in the Committee on Education, Science and Research between May 14, 2010, and December 31, 2012.

== Personal life ==
He was married and had two daughters, Anett and Cseperke.

== Death ==
He died in accident on 19 October 2014 at the age of 67.
