= Choi Soon-dal =

South Korean scientist (1931–2014)

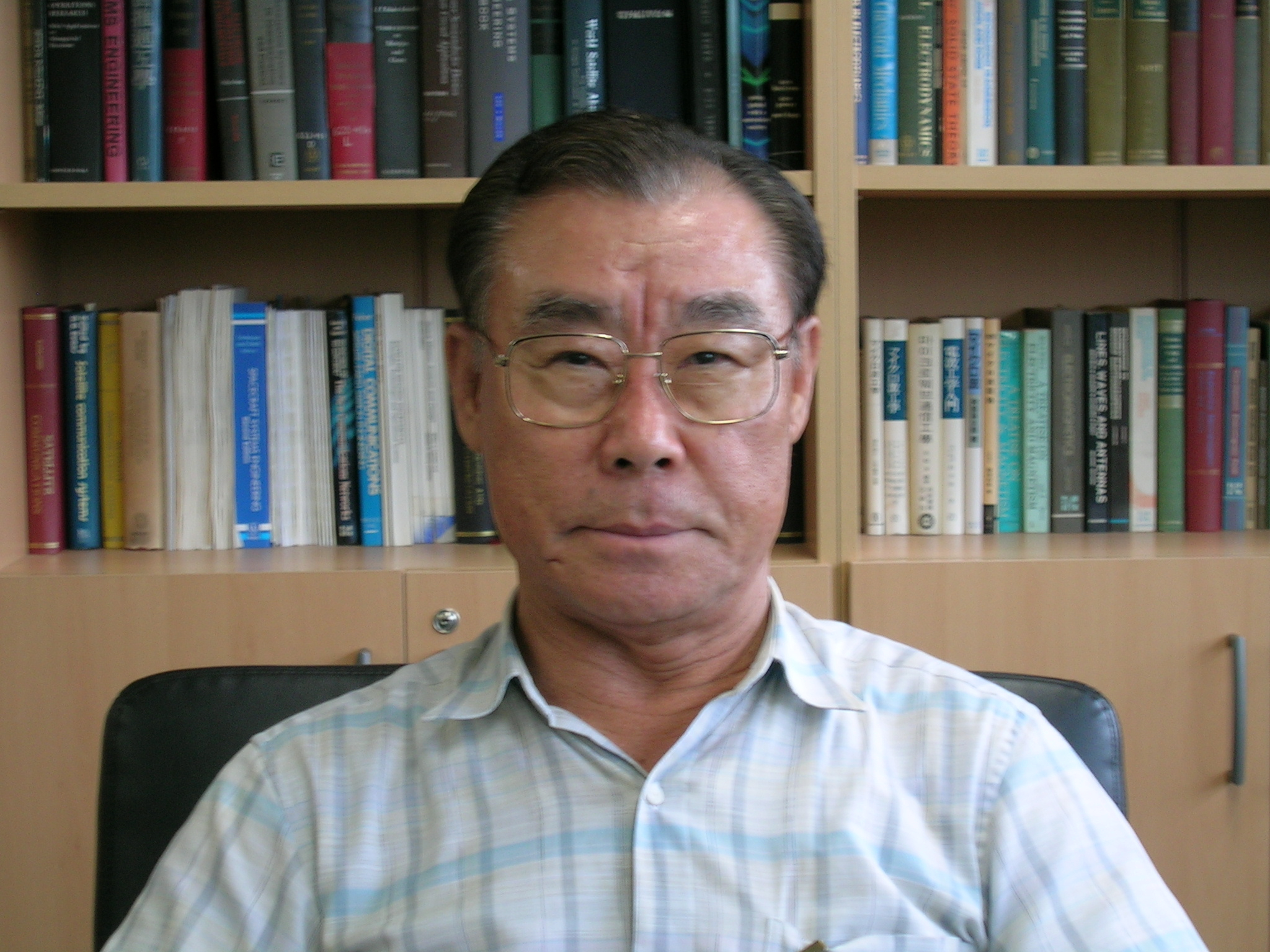
Soon Dal Choi, 2005

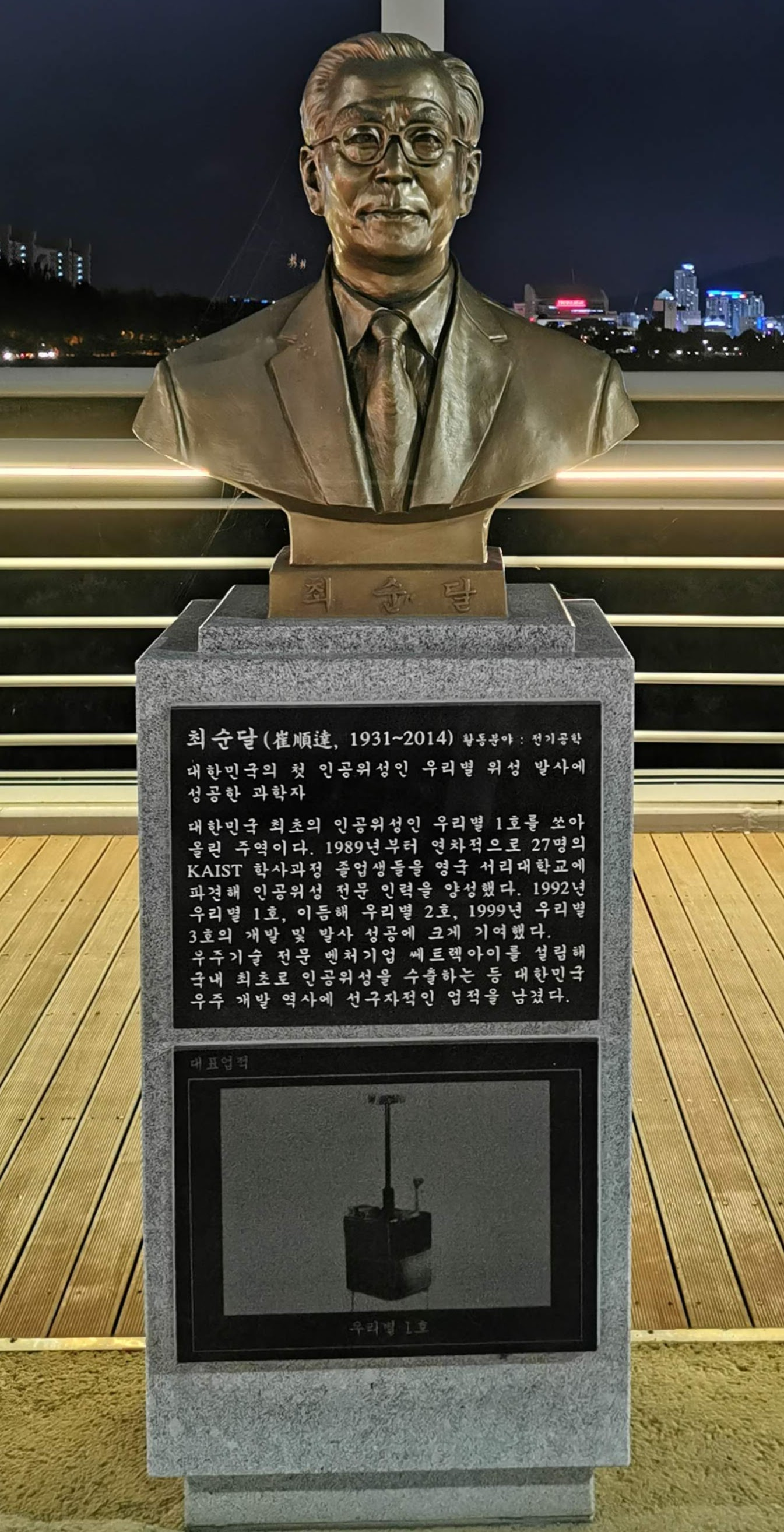
Choi Soon-dal's statue at the entrance of KAIST

Choi Soon-dal (Korean: 최순달; June 20, 1931 – October 18, 2014) was a South Korean scientist who pioneered South Korea's satellite-building program and greatly advanced Korea into the new digital information era. Dr. Choi's contributions to pioneering Korean space development have not only been widely publicized, but he is also regarded as the father of Korea's space development.

He was born on June 20, 1931 in Daegu.

Choi was instrumental in helping the Electronics and Telecommunications Research Institute develop the Electronic Switching System (TDX), the world's tenth such system, which propelled Korea to join the digital information era. He served as a minister in the Ministry of Information and Communication (South Korea). He was the visionary first dean of the Korean Institute of Technology, which later became a part of KAIST. As a professor at KAIST, he created the KAIST Satellite Technology Research Center and led a collaboration with students from KAIST and the University of Surrey to successfully engineer the first Korean satellite, KITSAT-1, also named "Our Star." The satellite was successfully launched from the Guiana Space Center in 1992.

Choi became a member of the Royal Swedish Academy of Engineering Sciences in 1985.

Choi died on October 18, 2014, at the age of 83 in Seoul. He was posthumously awarded a national medal of honor for his contribution to science and technology on October 21, 2014. He is the fourth civilian allowed to be buried at the Daejeon National Cemetery.

His wife, Hong Hae Jung, died in October 2023 in New York. They are survived by four children and six grandchildren who reside in the United States.
