= Alan Dawson (footballer) =

Australian rules footballer

Personal information
- Full name: Alan Dawson
- Born: 1 September 1932
- Died: 29 October 2014 (aged 82)
- Original team: Flinders Naval Base
- Height: 188 cm (6 ft 2 in)
- Weight: 89 kg (196 lb)

Playing career^{1}
Years	Club	Games (Goals)
1958	South Melbourne	2 (0)
- ^{1} Playing statistics correct to the end of 1958.

Alan Dawson (1 September 1932 – 29 October 2014) was an Australian rules footballer who played for the South Melbourne Football Club in the Victorian Football League.
