= Otto Brolo =

Guatemalan sports shooter

Personal information
- Born: 8 August 1929 Guatemala City, Guatemala
- Died: 21 October 2014 (aged 85)

Sport
- Sport: Sports shooting

Otto Brolo (8 August 1929 – 21 October 2014) was a Guatemalan sports shooter. He competed in two events at the 1968 Summer Olympics.
