= Antonio Terenghi =

Italian comics artist

- Born: 31 October 1921; Alano di Piave
- Died: 26 October 2014 (aged 92); Milan
- Occupation: comics artist

Antonio Terenghi (31 October 1921 – 26 October 2014) was an Italian comics artist.

Born in Alano di Piave, Province of Belluno, to a humble family, Terenghi moved to Milan in his teens, where he started working as an apprentice for a grocer and a blacksmith. Very passionate about cartooning – he began drawing comics at eight years as an autodidact – in the late 1930s he started working as a lettering artist for the publishing house Dardo. At the outbreak of World War II, he was sent to fight in East Africa, where he was captured by British troops and spent seven years in detention. One back in Milan, he reprised his work in the comics industry, creating Jungle comics characters like Tarzanetto for the publishing house Universo and the magazine Corriere dei Piccoli.

Terenghi is mostly known as the creator of Pedrito el Drito, one of the most enduring characters in the history of Italian comics. He continued to draw comic strips until he was 85 years old.

Terenghi was married to Natalina Luceri, who inspired the character of Pasquita.

== Selected bibliography ==
- Il grande Pedrito El Drito (Rizzoli, 1995)
- Pedrito el Drito (Sergio Bonelli Editore, 1999)
- Nuove avventure di Pedrito El Drito (The Walt Disney Company Italy, 2002)
- Provaci ancora Pedrito! (IF, 2003)
