= Donald King (lawyer) =

British lawyer and colonial Attorney-General of Nyasaland (1911–1997)

Ralph Malcolm Macdonald King, OBE (8 February 1911 – 15 March 1997), known as Donald King, was a British lawyer and colonial administrator. He was Attorney-General of Nyasaland from 1957 to 1961.

The son of Dr James Malcolm King, a GP, and Norah King, Donald King was born at Willingham, Cambridgeshire and was educated at Tonbridge School. After articling with a firm in Boston, he became a solicitor in 1934 and practiced for a short time in Portsmouth before joining the firm of Johnson, Stokes and Master in Hong Kong in 1936. He joined the Hong Kong Volunteers, and was later commissioned into the Middlesex Regiment.

Taken prisoner by the Japanese on Boxing Day, 1941, shortly after the Japanese invasion of Hong Kong, King was put in the hold of the Lisbon Maru with a large number of POWs for transportation to Japan. The ship was torpedoed by the submarine USS Grouper on 1 October 1942. King managed to escape from the sinking ship after being shot at by Japanese guards. He drifted in the ocean for 30 hours before reaching an island and had his hands and feet badly cut as he climbed ashore. He was recaptured by Japanese forces the following day and was transported to Kobe, where he was made to work in a graphite factory until the end of the war and suffered from beriberi.

After the war, King returned to Hong Kong, but left after a week due to the city's condition. He joined the Colonial Legal Service in 1947. He was first posted to Somaliland as a legal officer, being promoted to crown counsel in 1950. The same year, he was called to the English bar by Gray's Inn. In 1953, he was appointed Solicitor-General of Nyasaland, and in 1957 he was appointed Attorney-General. His tenure coincided with a critical period in the history of Nyasaland, which included the return of Dr Hastings Banda and the outbreak of nationalist disturbances against the Federation of Rhodesia and Nyasaland, which led to the declaration of a state of emergency and the Devlin Commission.
