= Bob Young (cricketer) =

Scottish cricketer

Personal information
- Full name: Robert William Young
- Born: 2 January 1933; Perth, Scotland
- Died: 1 October 2014 (aged 81); Perth, Scotland
- Source: Cricinfo, 11 April 2016

Bob Young (2 January 1933 – 1 October 2014) was a Scottish cricketer. He played six first-class matches for Scotland between 1962 and 1964.
