= Dave Engellenner =

Australian rules footballer

Personal information
- Full name: Dave Engellenner
- Born: 30 March 1919
- Died: 8 October 2014 (aged 95)
- Height: 175 cm (5 ft 9 in)
- Weight: 68 kg (150 lb)

Playing career^{1}
Years	Club	Games (Goals)
1941–1945	South Melbourne	30 (2)
- ^{1} Playing statistics correct to the end of 1945.

Dave Engellenner (30 March 1919 – 8 October 2014) was an Australian rules footballer who played with South Melbourne in the Victorian Football League (VFL).
