= Guido van Gheluwe =

Flemish lawyer (1926–2014)

Guido Richard van Gheluwe (3 April 1926, in Kortrijk – 1 October 2014, in Kortrijk) was a Belgian lawyer and founder of the Orde van den Prince. He founded the Orde van den Prince on 2 November 1955, and was its president from 1955 until 1964. Since July 1965 he bears the honorary title of President Founder of the Orde van den Prince.

== Education ==
Guido Van Gheluwe went to high school at the St. Amandscollege in Kortrijk, where he graduated in 1946. He obtained a PhD in law at the University of Ghent in 1951.

== Career ==
He joined the bar in Kortrijk in 1951 and worked as a lawyer until 1966. From 1952 until 1955 he was the private secretary of the minister for Belgian Congo.

From 2 November 1966 until 24 September 1971 he was the secretary-general of the non-profit organization Economic Council for Flanders (Dutch: Economische Raad voor Vlaanderen, E.R.V.). From 25 September 1971 until 26 September 1985 he was secretary-general of the Regional Economic Council for Flanders (Dutch: Gewestelijke Economische Raad voor Vlaanderen, GERV). From 27 September 1985 until 31 April 1986, he was secretary-general of the Social-Economic Council for Flanders.

He is professor emeritus of the Hoger Instituut voor Bestuurswetenschappen in Antwerp, where he taught from 1 October 1978 until 31 April 1986.

== Sources ==
- In Memoriam Guido van Gheluwe (Dutch)
- Heel de Orde van den Prince wordt ereburger (Dutch, newspaper article)
