= Gertjie Williams =

South African cricketer (1941–2014)

Personal information
- Born: 17 June 1941; Elsies River, Cape Province, South Africa
- Died: 4 October 2014 (aged 73); Bellville, South Africa
- Source: Cricinfo, 6 April 2016

Gertjie Williams (17 June 1941 – 4 October 2014) was a South African cricketer. He played seventeen first-class matches for Western Province between 1971 and 1975.
