= Joanne M. Holden =

American nutritionist

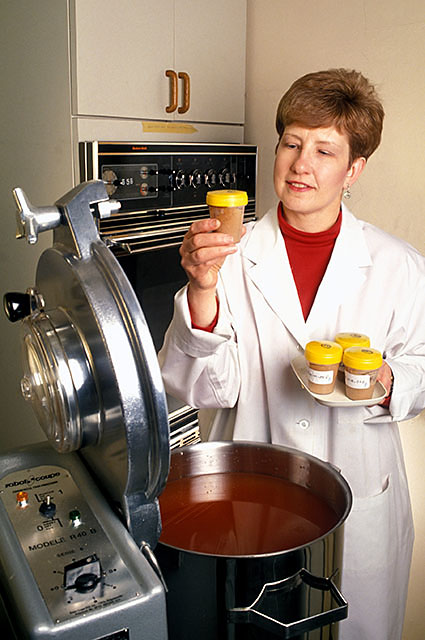
- Born: September 5, 1946
- Died: October 2, 2014 (aged 68); Elkridge, Maryland, US
- Education: University of Delaware, University of Maryland
- Known for: Nutrition
- Scientific career
- Fields: food science
- Workplaces: USDA Agricultural Research Service
- Thesis: The Influence of Dietary Sucrose Or Glucose on the Serum Glucose and Insulin Levels and Lipoprotein Profiles of Individuals (1974)

Joanne Merson Holden (September 5, 1946 – October 2, 2014) was an American nutritionist known for her food composition research. She served as head of the USDA Agricultural Research Service's Nutrient Data Laboratory and at the time of her death was ranked among the top 1% most cited researchers in agricultural science.

== Education ==
Joanne Holden received her Bachelor of Science degree in Foods and Nutrition from the University of Delaware in Newark, Delaware before going on to earn her Master of Science degree from the University of Maryland in 1974.

== Career & contributions ==
Over the course of her career, Holden published over 100 papers on food composition data production, collection, management, and documentation and nutrition analysis. Holden and her colleagues from the Agricultural Research Service's Nutrient Data Laboratory published 31 papers in the JFCA (Journal of Food Composition and Analysis). Holden was listed as an ISI Highly Cited researcher in 2014, meaning that she ranked among the top 1% most cited researchers in the field of agricultural science.

Her work contributed to the USDA National Nutrient Database for Standard Reference (also known as SR24), which is the standard source for food composition data in the U.S. for public and private sector uses. Among other projects, this work included significant updates to the nutrient information for fresh beef and pork products in 2012, as changes and improvements in animal husbandry practices and industry procedures over time affect nutrient content.

In addition, Holden furthered global food science education by serving as co-director (1994 to at least 2007) of the International Postgraduate Course for the Production, Management, and Use of Food Composition Data, a project of the UN Food and Agriculture Organization's International Network of Food Data Systems (INFOODS).
