= Gholamali Pouratayi =

Iranian musician (born 1941)

Gholamali Pouratayi (in Persian: غلام‌علی پورعطایی - born 1941 in Mahmoud Abad, Torbat-e Jam, Iran; died 4 October 2014) was an Iranian Mugham singer and Dotar player.
