= Robert B. Grady =

American software development engineer

Robert Bruce Grady (12 January 1943 – 18 October 2014) was an engineer who was an expert in software development. He attended the Massachusetts Institute of Technology (MIT), graduating in 1965 with a bachelor's degree in electrical engineering. He was a member of the Sigma Phi Epsilon fraternity, and he was a star player on the MIT basketball team. In 1965 he received the Howard W. Johnson Award for Male Senior Athlete of the Year, which is given to only one athlete per year across all athletics at MIT.

Grady wrote three books on software metrics and project management: Software Metrics: Establishing a Company-Wide Program (with Deborah L. Caswell), Practical Software Metrics for Project Management and Process Improvement, and Successful Software Process Improvement.

Grady and Caswell's first book, Software Metrics, has been cited 661 times in other scholarly articles and publications.
