= Albert Benjamin West =

American politician and lawyer (1883–1929)

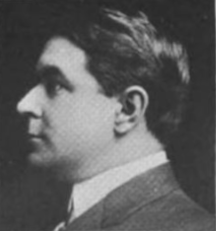
- West in 1917 publication
- In office 1911–1912

Personal details
- Born: January 21, 1883 Providence, Rhode Island, U.S.
- Died: March 26, 1929 (aged 46) Providence, Rhode Island, U.S.
- Party: Democratic
- Education: Brown University (BA, MA); Harvard Law School (LLB)
- Occupation: Politician; lawyer

Albert Benjamin West (January 21, 1883 – March 26, 1929) was an American politician and lawyer from Rhode Island. He served as a member of the Rhode Island House of Representatives from 1911 to 1912.

== Early life ==
Albert Benjamin West was born on January 21, 1883, in Providence, Rhode Island, to Margaret (née Hyde) and George J. West. His father was a criminal lawyer. He studied at Classical High School. West then graduated with a Bachelor of Arts and Master of Arts from Brown University in 1904. He graduated from Harvard Law School with a Bachelor of Laws in 1907. He was a member of Phi Beta Kappa and Phi Kappa.

== Career ==
West started practicing law in Providence in 1907. West was admitted to the United States Circuit Court in 1911. West was a Catholic.

West was a Democrat. He served as a member of the Rhode Island House of Representatives from 1911 to 1912. He also served in the Rhode Island Senate for two terms. During his tenure, he fought for property qualification in the Rhode Island Constitution and helped make changes to the Workmen's Compensation Act.

== Personal life ==
West read philosophy, history and French literature. He studied piano under Gaspard Saillant and played the organ.

West died on March 26, 1929, in Providence.
