= James I. West Jr. =

American politician

Member of the Georgia House of Representatives
- In office 1975–1976

Personal details
- Born: September 14, 1930 Hall County, Georgia, U.S.
- Died: October 1, 2014 (aged 84)
- Party: Democratic
- Education: University of Georgia; John Marshall Law School

James I. West Jr. (September 14, 1930 – October 1, 2014) was an American politician. He served as a Democratic member of the Georgia House of Representatives.

== Life and career ==
West was born in Hall County, Georgia. He attended the University of Georgia and John Marshall Law School.

West served in the Georgia House of Representatives from 1975 to 1976.

West died on October 1, 2014, at the age of 84.
