= Oscar Orefici =

Italian sport journalist and writer (1946–2014)

- Born: 13 July 1946; Rome
- Died: 26 October 2014 (aged 68); Rome
- Occupation: journalist

Oscar Orefici (13 July 1946 – 26 October 2014) was an Italian sport journalist and writer.

Born in Rome, Orefici started his career in the 1970s realizing several sport programs for RAI. An expert on Formula One, in 1978 he co-directed the documentary film Speed Fever. In the early 1990s, when Fininvest bought the F1 television rights, Orefici became the official reporter for F1 races and programs. In the late years of career he worked for Sky. He also worked for several newspapers and wrote several books, including two biographies about Enzo Ferrari.

== Books ==
- Oscar Orefici, Luca Argentieri. Storia della formula 1. Longanesi, 1987. ISBN 8830407348.
- Oscar Orefici. Enzo Ferrari. L'ingegnere rampante. Editalia, 1988. ISBN 9788870602104.
- Oscar Orefici. Carlo Chiti - Sinfonia Ruggente. Giorgio Nada Editore, 2003. ISBN 8885817025.
- Oscar Orefici: Ferrari. Romanzo di una vita. Cairo Publishing, 2007. ISBN 9788870602104.
