= Deborah Warren (actress) =

Argentine actress

Débora Whamond (1959 – October 13, 2014), known as Deborah Warren, was an Argentine theater, television and film actress. She made her television debut in 1979 in Mañana puedo morir. Her later television credits included comedy series like Las comedias de Darío Vittori (1989) and Matrimonios y algo más (1990), as well as telenovelas, including La extraña dama (1989) and Franco Buenaventura, el profe.

Warren died from cancer in Buenos Aires on October 13, 2014, at the age of 55.
