= Humberto Lara Gavidia =

Salvadoran baseball player

Humberto Lara "Beto" Gavidia was a Salvadoran baseball player. An infielder, he played in the El Salvadoran baseball league, then joined the country's national team. He played in the 1961 Baseball World Cup. He retired from baseball in 1968. He died October 30, 2014.
