= Don W. King =

American writer and activist

Donaldson Wells King (1942–2014) was a writer and gay rights activist in Charlotte, North Carolina.

King was born in Wilmington, North Carolina. He married in 1967 but later divorced his wife and gradually began "coming out." King would eventually become one of Charlotte's most outspoken activists for the civil rights of the LGBT community.

King was a writer who enjoyed a career in journalism. He first worked in Durham in the 1960s, and in the 1970s he was hired by the Charlotte Observer. His writing was marked by the positive way he portrayed the LGBT community. King's goal was to create an LGBT community that could stand by itself and push for equality within the Charlotte area.

In 1981 he co-founded the Queen City Quordinators (QCQ), a joint fundraising umbrella group for LGBT groups in Charlotte. QCQ published a newsletter named "Q Notes" beginning in 1983. King was hired as the first editor of the newsletter, publishing it monthly through 1987. His ability to stand up for civil rights in a respectful and gentle manner helped him become well known and respected in Charlotte.

Police harassment and entrapment of gay men was an issue that King was passionate about. In the late 1980s he led efforts to change the way police officers treated gay men and to stop undercover officers from entrapping gay men.

King helped start the Gay Pride Parade in Charlotte and later in the 1980s ran a gay and lesbian bookstore out of his apartment. He was also a devoted member of the Charlotte Bridge Club.

King died October 30, 2014, from pancreatic cancer at the age of 72.
