= Thomas Dupuy (kickboxer) =

French Thai boxer

- Born: May 18, 1982 (age 44); Toulouse, France
- Died: October 29, 2014 (aged 32); Gao, Mali
- Nationality: French

Thomas Dupuy (May 18, 1982 – October 29, 2014) was a French Air Force adjutant and a Thai boxer. He is the son of Marie-Christine Jaillet and Raymond Dupuy, two Toulouse academics.

== Biography ==
Thomas Dupuy practices Thai boxing at a high level. He became champion of France in 2002 (class B), champion of Europe in 2003, vice-champion of France class A in 2004 and World Champion the same year in Bangkok.

On October 29, 2014, at 2 h 507, he was the tenth soldier killed during an operation against AQIM in the Adrar Tigharghar massif and the Amettetai Valley. Tributes follow one another. He received military honors, the Legion of Honor, and was raised posthumously to the rank of Warrant Officer. A minute of silence was observed in his memory at the National Assembly on November 5, 2014.
