= Doran =

Doran may refer to:

== People ==
- Abbas Doran (1950–1982), Iranian IRIAF fighter pilot
- Ann Doran (1911–2000), American character actress
- Beauchamp Doran (1860–1943), British Army officer during the First World War
- Bernard Doran Killian, Irish-born American newspaper editor, lawyer, politician and writer
- Bertie Doran (1878—1948), Irish international rugby union player
- Bill Doran (disambiguation)
- Charles Guilfoyle Doran (1835–1909), Irish leading figure in the Irish Republican Brotherhood (IRB) and the Fenian Brotherhood
- Chris Doran (born 1979), Irish singer
- Colleen Doran, American writer-artist and cartoonist
- Daryl Doran (born 1963), U.S. indoor soccer player
- Edward Doran Davison, Jr. (1845–1902), lumber merchant and political figure in Nova Scotia, Canada
- Emma Doran (fl. 2010's), Irish comedian and podcaster
- Frank Doran (disambiguation)
- Fred Doran (1903–1958), Australian international rugby union player
- Gerry Doran (1877–1943), Irish rugby union international
- Henrietta Doran-York (born 1962), Sint Maartener politician
- Hilary B. Doran Jr. (1936–2019), American politician
- Jamie Doran, Irish-Scottish independent documentary filmmaker
- John Doran (disambiguation)
- John James Doran (1864–1904), Boatswain's Mate, 2nd Class in the United States Navy during the Spanish–American War
- Kelly Doran (1957–2023), American businessman and politician
- Kevin Doran (born 1953), Irish prelate and bishop of the Catholic Church
- Luke Doran (born 1991), Australian cricketer
- Madeleine Doran (1905–1996), American literary critic and poet
- Matt Doran (born 1976), Australian actor
- Michael Doran (disambiguation)
- Mildred Doran (1905–1927), American aviator
- Polly Doran (born 2001), Australian soccer player
- Robert Doran (disambiguation)
- Steve Doran, English community organiser, activist and former radio DJ
- Thomas G. Doran (1936–2016), American prelate of the Catholic Church, Roman Catholic bishop
- Tony Doran (born 1946), Irish retired hurler
- W. J. Doran (1886–1949), American politician, Missouri senator
- Walter Doran (born 1945), admiral in the United States Navy
- William Doran (1834–1903), Canadian mayor of Hamilton, Ontario
- William C. Doran (1884–1965), American associate justice of the California Court of Appeal
- Doran (gamer) (born 2000), South Korean gamer

== Places ==
- Doran, Kerman, Iran
- Doran, Minnesota, USA
- Doran Regional Park, Sonoma County, California, USA
- Ben Doran, mountain in Scotland
- Mount Doran, a mountain in Alaska, USA

== Ships ==
- USS Doran (DD-185), Wickes-class destroyer
- USS Doran (DD-634), Gleaves-class destroyer

== Fictional characters ==
- Vala Mal Doran, Stargate SG-1 character
- Doran Martell, a character from George Martin's A Song of Ice and Fire
