= John Doran =

John Doran may refer to:

- John Doran (baseball) (1867–after 1895), American baseball player
- John Doran (British Army officer) (1824–1903)
- John Doran (ice hockey) (1910–1975), Canadian ice hockey player
- John Doran (tennis) (born 1978), Irish tennis player
- John Doran (writer) (1807–1878), English editor and writer
- John Desmond Beauchamp Doran (1912–1946), British army intelligence officer
- John James Doran (1864–1904), American Medal of Honor recipient
- Johnny Doran (1907–1950), Irish uilleann piper
- Johnny Doran (actor) (born 1962), American child actor
- Jack Doran (born John Francis Doran; 1896–1940), Irish footballer
- John Doran (journalist) (born 1971), British music journalist
