= USS Doran =

Two ships of the United States Navy have been named Doran, in honor of John James Doran, a Medal of Honor recipient from the Spanish–American War.

- USS Doran (DD-185) was a Wickes-class destroyer, originally named USS Bagley and later transferred to the Royal Navy as HMS St Marys.
- USS Doran (DD-634) was a Gleaves-class destroyer during World War II.
