= Luke Turner (writer) =

British writer, editor and journalist

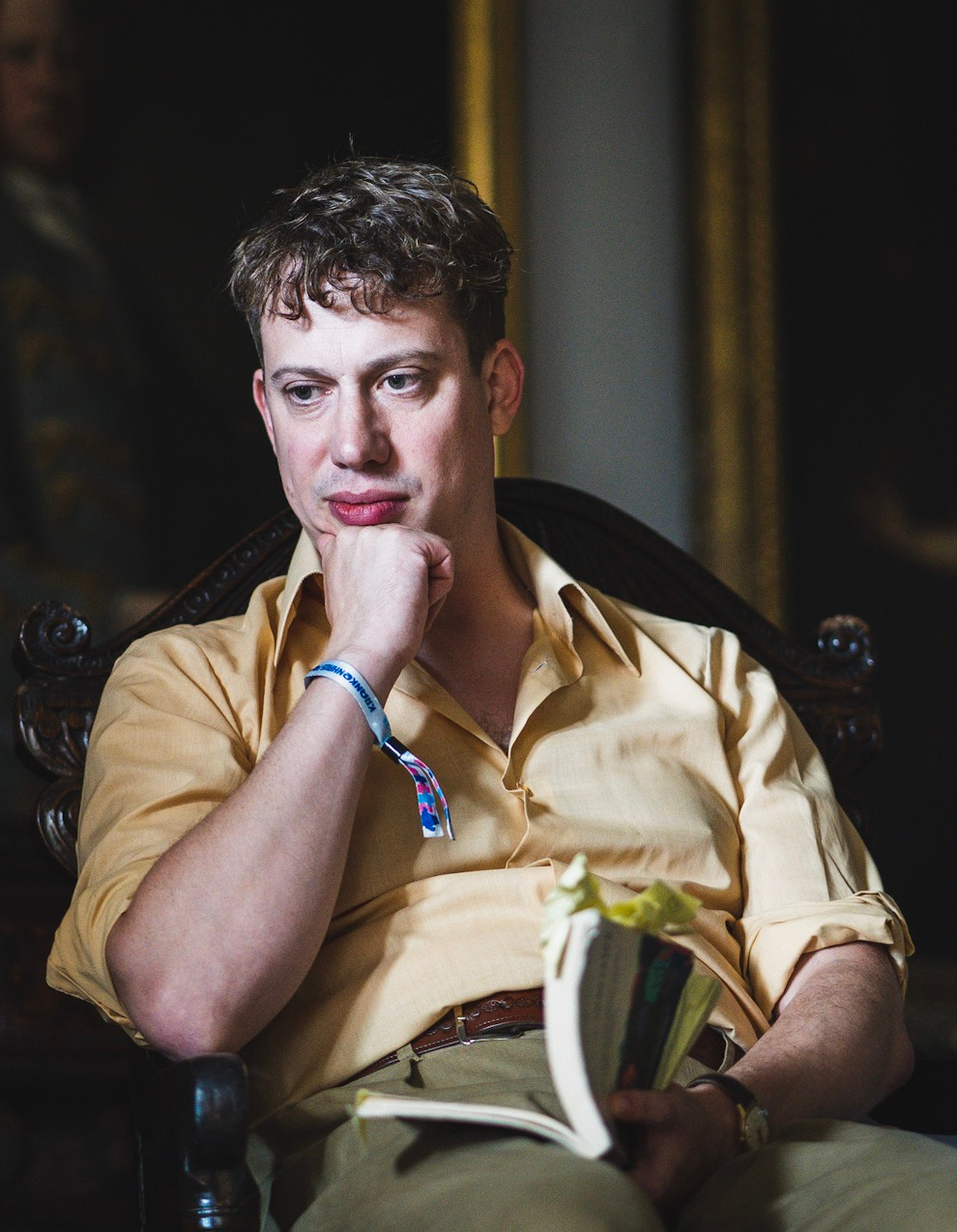
- Turner in 2019
- Born: Bradford, England
- Occupations: Writer; editor; journalist
- Years active: 2008–present
- Known for: Co-founding The Quietus
- Notable work: Out of the Woods (2019); Men at War (2023)
- Website: thequietus.com

Luke Turner is a British writer, editor and journalist, born in Bradford and based in London. He is a co-founder and editor of the online music and culture publication The Quietus, and the author of the memoirs Out of the Woods (2019) and Men at War: Loving, Lusting, Fighting, Remembering 1939–1945 (2023), both published by Weidenfeld & Nicolson.

== Career ==
=== The Quietus ===
Turner co-founded The Quietus in 2008 with the journalist John Doran. The publication was originally set up with funding from Sky, which withdrew its support shortly afterwards during the financial crisis of 2007–2008; Turner and Doran continued the site on an independent basis. Writing in Huck in 2018, Daniel Dylan Wray described the publication as having maintained editorial independence over its first decade.

=== Journalism ===
Outside The Quietus, Turner has written for The Guardian, Dazed, Vice, NME, Q, Mojo, Monocle, Nowness, Somesuch Stories and the BBC. His subjects have included music, men’s fashion (including British workwear), masculinity, in vitro fertilisation, commemoration of the Second World War and sexuality.

=== Books ===
==== Out of the Woods (2019) ====
Turner’s first book, Out of the Woods, was published by Weidenfeld & Nicolson in January 2019. The book is a memoir set in and around Epping Forest, framed by the breakdown of a long-term relationship and addressing the author’s bisexuality, his upbringing in a Methodist family, his experiences of child sexual abuse and his relationship with the Christian faith. Sections of the book had previously appeared in serialised form via the website Caught By The River.

Reviewing the book for The London Magazine, Robert Greer described it as a memoir that combined personal narrative with the history of Epping Forest, and that drew on figures including the philosopher Giambattista Vico, the industrial group Throbbing Gristle, the filmmaker Derek Jarman and the artist Austin Osman Spare. In The Guardian, Sukhdev Sandhu characterised the book as “a disturbing trauma narrative” that was also a work of comedy and “a learned meditation”. The paper also covered the book in its autobiography and memoir column, in a review by Rachel Cooke.

Prior to publication, Weidenfeld & Nicolson acquired the book in 2017. The book was shortlisted for the 2019 Wainwright Golden Beer Book Prize and longlisted for the 2019 Polari First Book Prize. Turner was selected by the crime novelist Val McDermid as one of ten LGBTQI+ writers featured in the National Centre for Writing’s International Literature Showcase in 2019.

In January 2019, Turner appeared on the NTS Radio programme Literary Friction to discuss the book. Turner also appeared on The Tom Robinson Show with Tom Robinson on BBC Radio 6 Music to discuss the book, in a conversation covering sexuality, mental health and forests. The book was also reviewed in Louder Than War, which contrasted it with the conventions of music-industry memoir.

In the London Evening Standard, the reviewer Mark Sanderson took a critical view of the book, characterising its author as a "Methodist in his madness" and questioning the framing of Turner's teenage encounters with older men as abuse.

Writing in the New Statesman, the nature writer Philip Hoare placed the book in what he characterised as a small sub-genre of queer nature writing whose antecedents included Denton Welch and Derek Jarman, and compared its rendering of edgeland woodland to the paintings of George Shaw.

In a 2019 interview with Another Man, Turner described the book as concerned with rejecting binary categories of identity and accepting personal contradictions, rather than as a redemptive nature memoir.

In an interview with Katie Goh for The List, Turner described the book's repetitive structure as a deliberate reflection of the experience of depression, and argued against the romanticised image he termed the "lone tormented man" of conventional nature writing.

==== Men at War (2023) ====
Turner’s second book, Men at War: Loving, Lusting, Fighting, Remembering 1939–1945, was published by Weidenfeld & Nicolson in 2023. The book examines masculinity and sexuality during the Second World War through a combination of memoir, interviews with veterans and historical research, drawing on the lives of writers, filmmakers, artists and members of Turner’s own family. Reviewing the book in History Today, Jack Doyle, a lecturer in LGBTQ+ history at the University of Oxford, wrote that Turner's focus on queer life stories — including the bisexual commando and writer Michael Burn and the transgender Spitfire pilot Roberta Cowell – drew together themes seldom considered together in scholarship on the World Wars.

Reviews appeared in a range of British and regional publications. The National covered the book in 2023. In Buzz magazine, the reviewer described Men at War as taking what they characterised as a novel approach to the legacy of the Second World War by examining both Turner's own interest in the subject and its continuing place in British public life. Writing in the Waltham Forest Echo, David O'Driscoll, who reviewed the paperback edition in 2024, focused on Turner's discussion of masculinity and sexuality during wartime, including the suggestion in the book that the war period, rather than the 1960s, represented a significant change in attitudes to sexual fluidity among British men.

In a review for Louder Than War, Richard Foster placed the book in a literary tradition of British wartime writing concerned with marginal or non-combatant figures, citing works by Anthony Powell, Evelyn Waugh, Terence Rattigan and Julian Maclaren-Ross, and described it as an alternative study of British attitudes to those who served in the Second World War.

The book was also reviewed in The Telegraph, whose review focused on the book's accounts of the lives of Second World War servicemen and the place of sex in wartime experience.

Reviewing the book for The Times, the paper covered it under the headline "The secret lives of soldiers", framing it as a reassessment of who the men who served actually were. In a review for i, Alim Kheraj characterised the book as part self-examination and part historical reframing, and argued that it challenged what he described as Britain's flattening of those who lived through the Second World War into archetypal heroes by attending instead to the complexity of their minds and bodies.

=== Other work ===
According to the National Centre for Writing, Turner also wrote the pamphlet Tracks, published by Rough Trade Books in 2019, and contributed to the 2018 Victoria and Albert Museum collaboration The Good Purvider (Windswept Baby). In 2019, Turner was a co-curator of The People’s Forest, a programme of events held as part of the London Borough of Waltham Forest’s tenure as the inaugural London Borough of Culture. In 2022, Turner contributed an essay on Vaughan Williams's The Wasps to the BBC Radio 3 strand The Essay, as part of a series titled Vaughan Williams: Belonging produced by Naked Productions.

== Personal life ==
Turner was born in Bradford, and was 40 at the time of his first book's publication in January 2019. His father worked as a Methodist minister, and the family moved frequently during his childhood as a result; his parents had both grown up on the edge of Epping Forest and his aunt and uncle continued to live in nearby Theydon Bois. Turner spent his adolescence in St Albans. and attended Verulam School. He has written publicly about being bisexual, his experiences of child sexual abuse in his early teens and about his upbringing in a Methodist family in which his father was a minister.

== Works ==
- Out of the Woods. London: Weidenfeld & Nicolson, 2019. ISBN 978-1-4746-0715-5
- Tracks. London: Rough Trade Books, 2019 (pamphlet).
- Men at War: Loving, Lusting, Fighting, Remembering 1939–1945. London: Weidenfeld & Nicolson, 2023. ISBN 978-1-4746-1886-1
