= German attack on Vimy Ridge =

Battle during the First World War

German attack on Vimy Ridge (Unternehmen Schleswig-Holstein)
- Part of Local operations December 1915 – June 1916 Western Front, First World War
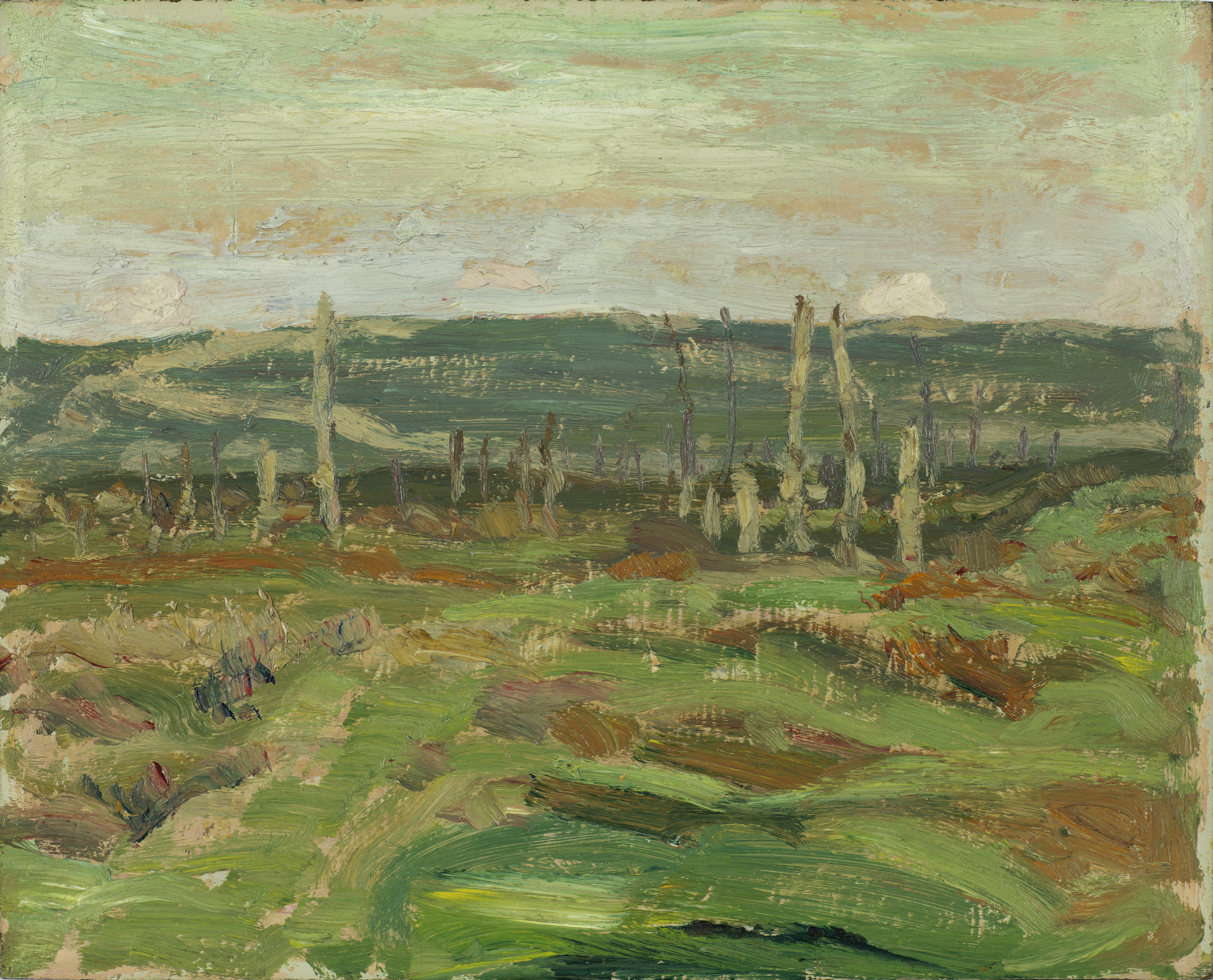
- A.Y. Jackson: Vimy Ridge from Souchez Valley
| Date | 21–22 May 1916 |
| Location | Vimy Ridge, Nord-Pas-de-Calais, France 50°22′24″N 02°48′41″E |
| Result | German victory |

Belligerents
| Germany | United Kingdom |

Commanders and leaders
| Erich von Falkenhayn | Douglas Haig |

Strength
| 4 regiments (part) | 4 brigades (part) |

Casualties and losses
| 22–25 May: 1,344 | 22–24 May: 2,475; includes 300 POW |
- Vimy Ridge, in a commune in the Pas-de-Calais department. The ridge runs south-east from Givenchy-en-Gohelle to Farbus

The German attack on Vimy Ridge (Unternehmen Schleswig-Holstein/Operation Schleswig-Holstein) was a local attack on the Western Front on 21 May 1916, during the First World War. The Germans intended to prevent mines being blown under German positions by capturing the British front line and mine gallery entrances. After the Third Battle of Artois (25 September – 4 November 1915) the French Tenth Army had held positions on the western slope of Vimy Ridge and the German 6th Army occupied positions on the steeper eastern slope. During the Battle of Verdun (21 February – 18 December 1916), the Tenth Army was withdrawn and the British First Army and Third Army, on either flank, took over the French positions.

The mine warfare waged by the French was continued by the British, exploiting the advantage of being on the dip slope and only having to dig horizontally into the ridge to undermine German positions. The Germans, on the steeper scarp slope, had to dig down before they could dig horizontally, a disadvantage made worse by a shortage of manpower and mining equipment. An attack was planned by the Germans to capture the British positions, from which mine galleries were being dug under the German defences. Success would gain more defensive depth and forestall mine attacks on the German positions before the British could organise their defences on the ridge.

The Germans attacked on 21 May and were able to consolidate their objectives before the British could conduct counter-attacks powerful enough to recapture the ground. In the attack and its aftermath the Germans suffered 1,344 casualties against 2,475 British losses. A British plan to recapture the front positions and take the German side of the ridge was cancelled because of the demand for men and equipment for the forthcoming Battle of the Somme. The Attack on the Gommecourt Salient took priority over another attack on the ridge. British planning continued and became the basis for the much larger attack by the Canadian Corps at the Battle of Vimy Ridge (9–12 April 1917).

== Background ==
=== Winter 1915–1916 ===
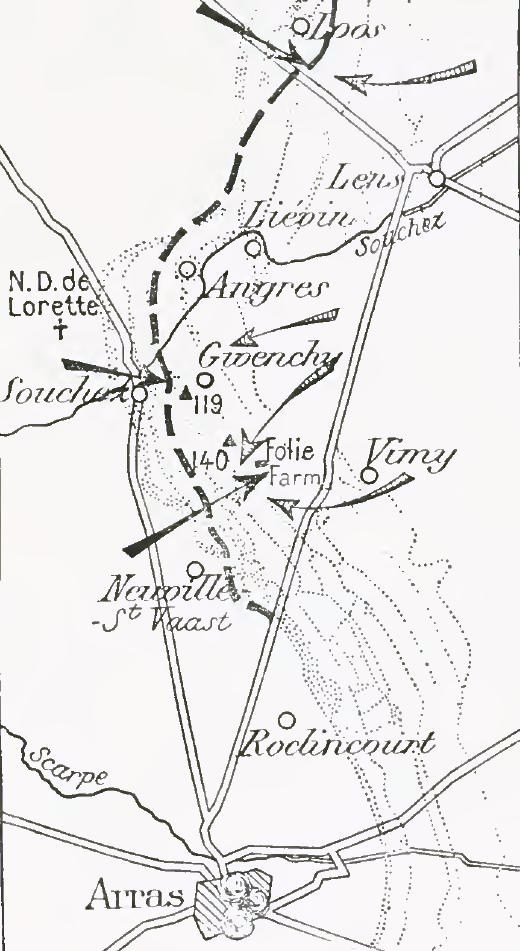
Third Battle of Artois, September–October 1915

Vimy Ridge extends from the Scarpe river valley east of Arras northwards for 9 mi (14 km) to the valley of the Souchez river. During the winter of 1915–1916, the German and French troops on the ridge spent much time trying to drain and repair trenches. In the area of the German 17th Reserve Division, long trenches were dug to divert water from the front trenches; in January 1916, about 4,900 ft (1,500 m) of duckboards were laid by Reserve Infantry Regiment 76 alone. Conditions were so bad in the front line that soldiers fraternised to alleviate the conditions; on 25 January, the German companies in the line were transferred to end the fraternising. Conditions became so bad that infantry units were set to work to maintain the troops in the front line. The rains and French mortar fire destroyed German field fortifications almost as fast as they were built. To gain more defensive depth and to mislead the French about German offensive preparations at Verdun, the I Bavarian Reserve Corps (General der Infanterie Karl von Fasbender) conducted Unternehmen Rupprecht (Operation Rupprecht), several carefully prepared local attacks.

A battalion of Reserve Infantry Regiment 229 built fake encampments and made several approach marches to simulate reinforcements to French reconnaissance aircraft. Unternehmen Rupprecht I began on 23 January, when the 2nd Bavarian Division blew mines and captured several French trenches near Thélus. The 50th Reserve Division conducted Unternehmen Rupprecht II on 24 January and Unternehmen Rupprecht III on 26 January. French mortar fire began at 3:00 a.m. on 27 January and at 5:40 a.m., French infantry made grenade attacks against Reserve Infantry Regiment 230 of the 50th Reserve Division, which managed to repulse the attacks. At 11:00 a.m. the French bombardment reached the intensity of drumfire (shells exploding in such quick succession that the reports merged into a rumble) and at 1:10 p.m. the Germans were forced to retire. To the north, the 1st Bavarian Division undertook Unternehmen Rupprecht IV on 28 January, against the French 390th and 97th Infantry Regiments of the Chasseurs Alpins, to improve the Bavarian positions on Hill 145. The plan was to sap forward until the front line was 87–109 yd (80–100 m) from the French lines and then attack after a bombardment and a mine explosion on each flank. The preparations were obvious and the French replied with small-arms fire and artillery bombardments.

=== Tenth Army ===
The relief of the French Tenth Army by the British First Army (General Charles Monro) and Third Army (Lieutenant-General Edmund Allenby) was accomplished by early March 1916. The French had held about 20 mi (32 km) of front running from Ransart in the south, east of Arras, west of Vimy, east of Souchez, west of Lens and east of Loos to the north. The southern portion of the line up to Arras had been quiet since the battles of manoeuvre in September 1914 and an informal truce had developed. Further north, in the area of the three great battles of Artois in 1914 and 1915, hostilities had continued and on 8 February, the Germans captured 0.5 mi (0.80 km) of trench south of Central Avenue (Ave). On 21 February, the first day of the Battle of Verdun, Reserve Infantry Regiment 162 of the |17th Reserve Division captured Hill 120 (Giessler Heights, called The Pimple or Hill 145 by the British) the only ridge-top position still held by the French from the offensives of 1915. The German positions on the ridge gave excellent observation over the positions inherited by the British and made finding artillery emplacements most difficult. The maze of derelict and active trenches and artillery positions on and behind the ridge turned out to be an advantage, because the German artillery lacked the ammunition to bombard every position; many empty ones were hit and then repaired as a deception.

=== Vimy Ridge ===
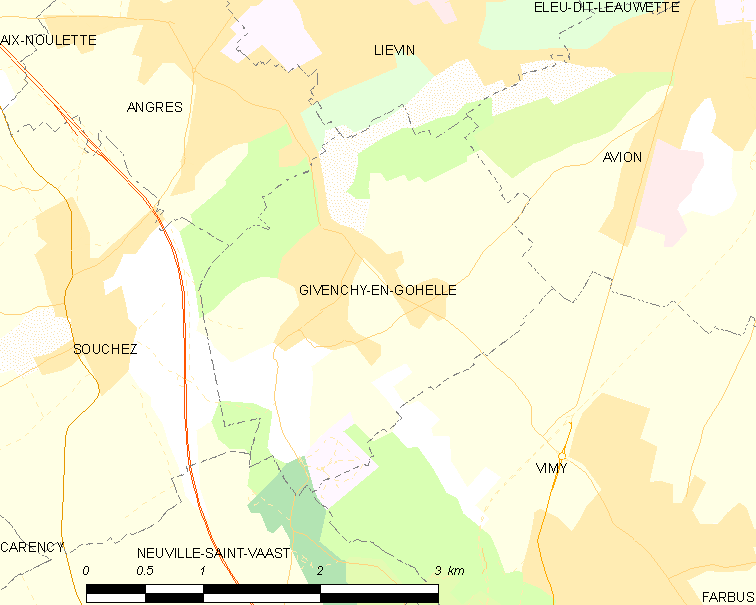
Modern map showing Souchez and Givenchy en Gohelle, north of Vimy Ridge (commune FR insee code 62371)

The vacated French defences on the ridge were considered by the British to be very poor, the French having relied on the firepower of their quick firing Canon de 75 modèle 1897 field guns, rather than continuous trench lines. In places, the British found that the front was only a line of sandbags on the earth. The ground was a quagmire and the front trenches could only be reached at night, after labouring through deep mud. By May the ground had dried, except in Zouave Valley. There were few communication trenches to the front line, they were waterlogged and filthy with corpses.

Where barbed wire had been put out, it was poor and in bad condition; the French positions were good enough for jumping-off lines for another attack but not for defence. The British resumed hostilities, only to find that their trench parapets were not bulletproof and both sides came into the open to dig better defences under a tacit truce. The British then found that the superiority of German observation was such, that turning the area into a "windy corner" of the Western Front had backfired; the construction of better defences was much harder than expected.

British army, corps and divisional boundaries were changed in early 1916, when divisions from the First Army, Second Army and Third Army were withdrawn to reinforce the Fourth Army on the Somme. On Vimy Ridge, the Berthonval and Carency sectors were transferred to IV Corps (Lieutenant-General Henry Wilson) of the First Army, from XVII Corps (Lieutenant-General Sir Julian Byng) of the Third Army and from the 25th Division to the 47th (1/2nd London) Division, which extended its right flank .75 mi (1.21 km) southwards to P sector. The positions were high along the western slope of Vimy Ridge and down the north-facing slope between Souchez and Givenchy-en-Gohelle. From south to north the communication trenches to the British front line on the ridge were Grange Ave and Lassalle Ave–Royal Ave in P sector. In the Berthonval sector, access was by Central Ave–Cannon Street, Wortley Ave–International Ave, Landwehr Ave and in the Carency sector, the communication trenches were Ersatz Ave–Ersatz Alley, Uhlan and Coburg alleys.

Neither side controlled the crest and to the south of the Berthonval sector, the British intended to treat the front line as the main line of resistance, to protect Zouave Valley, which rose southwards from the valley of the Souchez river, about 800 yd (730 m) back from the front line. German gunners continually bombarded the Talus de Zouaves (Zouave embankment) in Zouave Valley, which could cut off British contact with the front line. The British could see the Douai Plain behind Vimy Ridge from Loretto Ridge to the north-west but the pit villages dotted around the Lens coalfield made plenty of hides for the German artillery.

IV Corps had the 23rd Division and 47th (1/2nd London) Division in the line and the 2nd Division (Major-General William Walker) in reserve near Brouay 10–13 mi (16–21 km) behind the front line. When the 47th (1/2nd London) Division moved its right flank to the south, the army boundary was shifted from Ersatz Ave to Central Ave. Two battalions of its 142nd Brigade held the Carency sector and a battalion of the 140th Brigade held the line in the Souchez sector, with the other battalions holding the Loretto Spur defences. During the reshuffle of 19/20 May, the northern defences were taken over by the 23rd Division and the 140th Brigade took over Berthonval from the 74th Brigade, 25th Division and the 141st Brigade took over Carency from the 142nd Brigade, which went into divisional reserve and the 7th Brigade, 25th Division in P sector came temporarily under the command of the 47th (1/2nd London) Division. The intention to use the French front line as the principal defence had been thwarted by the German miners and detached posts established instead of a trench line were under constant German observation. Troops moved forward after dark and held the posts from 9:00 p.m. – 9:00 a.m. but hardly any more wire had been put out and the posts had no dugouts. The support line towards the bottom of the slope was supposed to be the main line of resistance but wet weather and German bombardments destroyed during the day what had been built in the night.

== Prelude ==
=== British operations ===
When Haig discovered the real state of the French defences on the ridge, he ordered Allenby to hold the front line with outposts and strongpoints further back on the best defensive line that could be found. A retirement for 3,000–4,000 yd (1.7–2.3 mi; 2.7–3.7 km), to a defensible line between Ecurie and Souchez, was judged politically impossible, after the great sacrifices made by the French in 1915. A retirement would also show the Germans that no spring offensive was intended, contrary to Haig's desire that one should be made to appear imminent by mining and trench raiding on the ridge. The British inherited a substantial French mining effort but found that German mining was more advanced. The war underground was taken over by the 172nd, 175th, 176th, 181st, 182nd, 184th, 255th Tunnelling Companies RE, the 23rd Division mining company and the New Zealand Tunnelling Company, with five French tunnelling companies (gradually reduced to two). For the infantry of both sides, the feeling of sitting on a volcano was nerve racking. When either side sprung a mine, their troops would rush forwards and try to consolidate the near lip as their opponents smothered the area with artillery and machine-gun fire.

At 4:45 a.m. on 3 May, the British sprung four mines a little to the north of Ersatz Ave, which formed three big craters. The crater lips, from which the British had excellent observation, were occupied by troops from the 1/21st Battalion, London Regiment (1/21st Battalion) of the 142nd Brigade, 47th (1st London) Division (Major-General Sir Charles Barter) and the 2/3rd London Field Company RE, with casualties of four killed and 18 wounded; the craters were named Momber, Love and Kennedy. On 15 May, the British blew another five mines between White Hart Ave and Angel Ave in the Berthonval sector under German trenches in an area they had captured in a previous attack. The new craters were swiftly occupied by six parties of the 11th Battalion, Lancashire Fusiliers and a detachment from the 9th Battalion, Loyal North Lancashire from the 74th Brigade, 25th Division and named the Crosbie Craters. Working parties dug in on the forward edge of the craters, assisted by the 105th Field Company RE and the divisional pioneer battalion, at a cost of 107 casualties. The Germans detonated a mine some distance behind the German front line to site an observation post but did not counter-attack. The Germans bombarded the craters every night and used trench mortars, systematically to obliterate the British defensive positions on the ridge.

After a British mine attack on 15 May, a German destructive bombardment on the ridge defences was accompanied by artillery registration (adjustments of aim by trial and error, directed by an observer in the air or on the ground) on the British communication trenches. In the five weeks before 21 May, the 25th Division (Major-General Beauchamp Doran) suffered 1,270 casualties, although the British miners gradually gained an advantage over their German counterparts. The infantry thought that the Germans were going to attack but air reconnaissance found no signs of preparations. In the weeks before the German attack, the weather was so bad that reconnaissance flights over the ridge by the Royal Flying Corps (RFC) had been possible on only ten days. Aircraft observers saw several new light railways, a supply dump and at one place new assembly trenches were observed. The last reconnaissance before the German attack was flown on 17 May; the crew flew over the German trenches from 2,500 to 4,000 ft (760 to 1,220 m) but found that it was too dark to see into them. British military intelligence took the view that the Germans lacked the infantry and artillery necessary for an attack and the transfer of divisions from the First, Second and Third armies to reinforce the Fourth Army continued.

=== German preparations ===
On 15 April 1916, General Hugo von Freytag-Loringhoven, the Stellvertretender Generlaquartiermeister (Deputy Quartermaster-General) of Oberste Heeresleitung (OHL, Supreme Army Command) took over the 17th Reserve Division in the Vimy sector while its commander, General Ernst von Zieten, was on sick leave, then took over command of the IX Reserve Corps temporarily for General Max von Boehn. Loringhoven found that the sector was by no means quiet, with a constant drain of casualties from mine blasts and night attacks. At the end of April, Loringhoven decided that a more permanent reply to the British was necessary and began to think of forcing the British back to the positions that the Germans had held before the Third Battle of Artois and occupying the British mine galleries. (Note: German regimental accounts emphasise the effect on morale of the continuous uncertainty caused by British mining and the prospect of entombment. In another account, the inability of the Germans to reply in kind, due to a lack of resources, also depressed morale.) When the 4th Guard Division relieved the 1st Bavarian Division opposite the British 25th Division in early May, British mine attacks were increasing in frequency and the German divisional pioneer companies were supplemented by Bergmannszüge (Mine Sections) and Bavarian pioneer units which had stayed behind. Loringhoven used his influence at OHL to mass eighty artillery batteries for the operation on the 4 mi (6.4 km) of front from Liévin, a suburb of Lens, to Vimy, carefully hidden between houses and in buildings. British positions were photographed by reconnaissance aircrews and aircraft reinforcements and anti-aircraft guns, some on lorries, were used to deter British reconnaissance aircraft. Telephone silence was enforced and a stream of trucks delivered ammunition, un-noticed by the British.

=== Plan ===
As the greater part of the attack was to be conducted by Infantry Regiment 163, it was named Unternehmen Schleswig-Holstein and orders for the operation were issued on 9 May. The attack was to begin in the middle of the month but postponements delayed the attack until 9:45 p.m. (7:45 p.m. British Summer Time) on 21 May. The front was divided into three sectors, South with Foot Guard Regiment 5 (4th Guard Division), Centre with Reserve Infantry Regiment 86 and Reserve Jäger Battalion 9 of the 18th Reserve Division and North with Infantry Regiment 163 (less one battalion) from the 17th Reserve Division accompanied by Machine Gun Troop 71 and Pioneer Company 268, all three sector regiments being reinforced by machine-gun and engineer units; two infantry regiments were held in reserve. Eighty artillery batteries, including the guns of IX Reserve Corps, IV Corps and the Guard Reserve Corps, plus six batteries of heavy howitzers and nine mortar batteries, along with six heavy, nine medium and eight light Minenwerfer batteries were to participate. Sufficient ammunition was provided for the artillery to fire at a rate of 200 shells per hour; counter-battery reconnaissance aircrews managed to locate 83 British artillery emplacements.

== Attack ==
=== 21 May ===
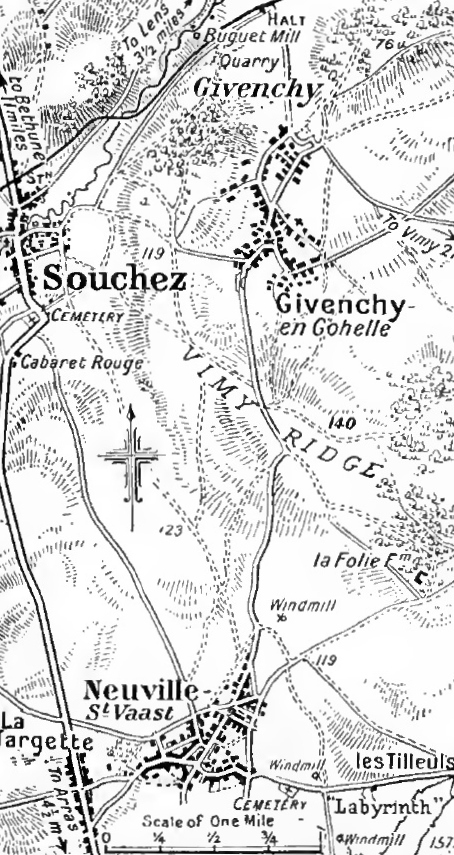
Vimy Ridge and vicinity

The German artillery began the preparatory bombardment at 5:30 p.m., firing gas shell at the support and reserve positions behind the British front line for ten minutes and then all guns began to sweep from the British front line to the rear and back again, ready to bombard simultaneously the British front line at 6:00 p.m. German observers in balloons and aircraft were watching for British artillery-fire to direct counter-battery fire on them, the balloon observers spotting 60 batteries and the aircrew another 23 batteries. The German artillery continued until 9:45 p.m., each battery of four guns firing at the rate of 200 shells per hour, against which, the British artillery reply was disorganised. As German shells fell on the British support and reserve lines and approaches, the guns still firing on the front line lifted the range by 150 m (160 yd) at 9:45 p.m. (German time, 7:45 p.m. British time, used henceforth); a minute later the infantry attack began.

At 4:43 p.m., 10 Kite Balloon Section RFC, sent up its balloon, which stayed up all night. The balloon observers were able to see the German bombardment and keep headquarters informed as the bombardment intensified at 9:00 p.m. and track the barrage as it crept forward in front of the German infantry. When the German barrage lifted off the British front line at 7:45 p.m. a mine exploded close to Royal Ave and the German attack began. The German left flank (British right flank) advanced on Royal Ave, short of which was Broadmarsh Crater, to the north-west of a new crater, which had been captured by the British on the night of 18/19 May and the German right flank (British left) attacked towards Momber Crater. In the smoke and dust the German infantry got half-way across no man's land before the British could see them, moving in skirmish lines, the men 3 yd (2.7 m) apart. Behind the foremost line, the British could see men carrying barbed wire, wood and machine-guns. The Germans were able to walk into the sector of the 140th Brigade, where the survivors of the bombardment were stunned and their weapons smashed or buried. The 47th (1/2nd London) Divisional artillery was short of ammunition and unable to help as communications had been cut. Many men of the 1/7th and 1/8th London were caught in their shelters and captured, except for a few who fought hand to hand.

On the front of Reserve Jäger Battalion 9 (RJB 9) the 1st and 4th companies advanced to encounter determined resistance from the British infantry in the front trench, which was quickly overcome. The fight for the British reserve trench was much harder, particularly in sections where the German bombardment has been least effective. Some British troops erected barricades in parts of the trench and then fought until all were killed. (Note: British troops captured later said that they thought that the Germans would not take prisoners, making surrender pointless.) Liaison between German units was difficult and later a fighting patrol was sent to gain touch with Footguard Regiment 5 (FR 5). On the right flank, RIR 86 had advanced so far that the 4th Company RJB 9 had to attack again to come into line and bogged down in the British reserve positions. Small British counter-attacks were repulsed during the night but the main effort went into consolidating the new positions and linking them to the old front line.

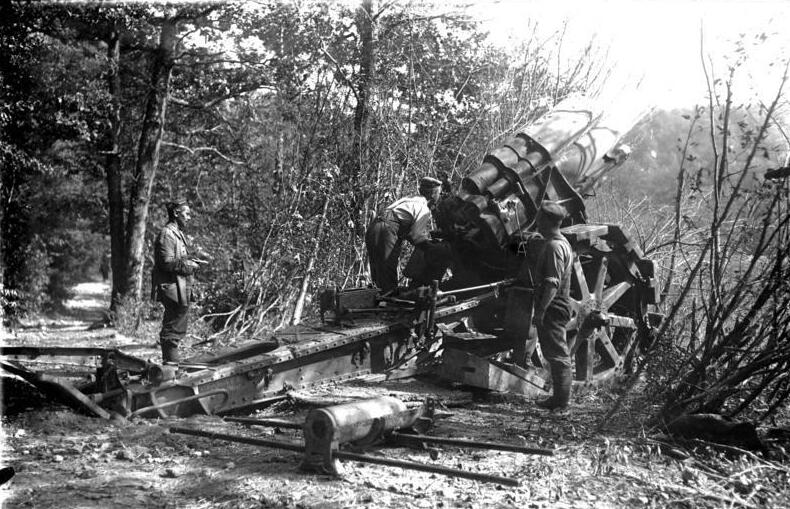
Photograph of a German 210 mm howitzer (in the Argonne, 1915)

The survivors from the British front line retreated to the reserve line along the Talus des Zouaves embankment in Zouave Valley and the 1/3rd. 1/4th and 2/3rd London Field companies RE were rushed up to occupy the trenches on the west slope of the valley. The German attack to the south against the positions of the 7th and 141st Brigades was less successful but the outpost line, part of the support line and Broadmarsh Crater were lost. The 10th Battalion, Cheshire Regiment on the right flank and the 1/20th London made defensive flanks along communication trenches and prevented their positions from being rolled up. All of the heads of the British mine galleries except for one in Royal Ave were captured; the Germans began to consolidate and the German guns kept up their bombardment for another eight hours. Small British parties attempted to make hasty counter-attacks but until the German bombardment slackened around 10:00 p.m. British headquarters remained ignorant of the situation on the ridge; the commander of the 141st Brigade, Brigadier-General William Thwaites, was in Zouave Valley when the German bombardment began and managed to contact the 47th (1/2nd London) Division HQ.

On the front of FR 5 the reinforced II Battalion was to make a narrow-front attack straight down Hill 145 and just before H-Hour the battalion was squeezed into every patch of cover up Hill 145 from the Transfeld Crater. After the bombardment from 5:30 to 9:45 p.m. the troops attacked and a mine exploded, creating the Schleswig-Holstein Crater, near Broadmarsh Crater. A British machine-gun crew fired from the south and hit several German machine-gunners, preventing the Germans from occupying the crater until the gun was silenced. Another German platoon was shot down by a British machine-gun on the far side of the Transfeld Crater but the German infantry managed to advance between the two craters and close the gaps that had appeared in the German line as the Germans and British fought with hand-grenades. By 10:15 p.m. touch had been gained with RJB 9 on the left and the 5th Company on the right. Several troops tried to rush the British third line but were caught in crossfire and killed. An officer jumped into a trench and cut all the wires he could find but engineers advancing with the infantry failed to find any mine entrances.

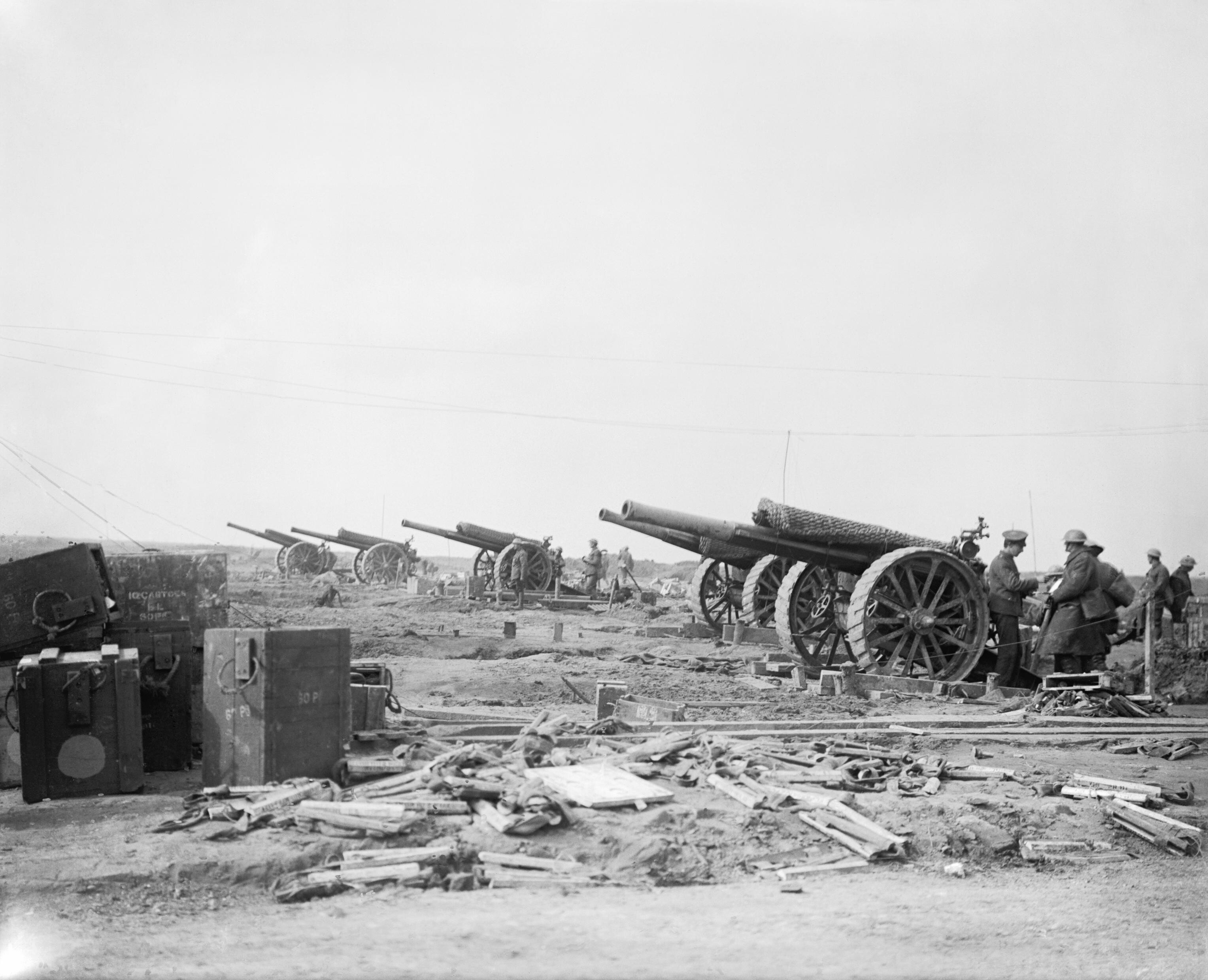
60-pounder guns similar to those at Vimy (photographed at Arras, 1917)

The 47th (1/2nd London) Division HQ had ordered the 142nd Brigade up to a reserve position 3 mi (4.8 km) behind the front line and Wilson ordered the 99th Brigade, 2nd Division forward in lorries and buses to the 47th (1/2nd London) Division HQ. Plans were made for a counter-attack at 2:00 a.m. on 22 May by the 47th (1/2nd London) Division reserves but only some under-strength companies of the 1/15th London, 140th Brigade and the 1/18th London of the 141st Brigade took part. The Germans had already consolidated and the attack was repulsed. On the right flank the 8th Loyal North Lancashire recaptured the lost portion of the 7th Brigade area. Artillery reinforcements of 1 1/2 BL 9.2-inch howitzer and two BL 60-pounder gun batteries from the First Army was sent to IV Corps and the corps moved two field brigades of the 2nd Division from reserve to the 47th (1/2nd London) Division. Ammunition for the guns was limited, much of what was available was faulty and the new units were unfamiliar with the ridge.

About an hour later the British trenches had been occupied and a mine gallery was discovered by German troops off a blind sap (a trench with a dead-end) with sixteen British troops inside behind a barricade; the British surrendered once they had been discovered. The Germans had great difficulty consolidating their new positions, in the dark, under artillery-fire and counter-attack; in the 8th Company area, the troops formed a human chain to pass hand-grenades forward. As dawn broke, the new positions had been dug down to head height but linking the new diggings to the lips of craters was done with great difficulty, because the explosions had thrown a great deal of earth onto the crater edges and British troops were throwing grenades into the craters. Communication trenches were too shallow; soldiers had to crawl along them once the sun was up and many were hit by bullets. The captured trenches had much British equipment in them which was used by the Germans to repulse counter-attacks.

=== 22–24 May ===
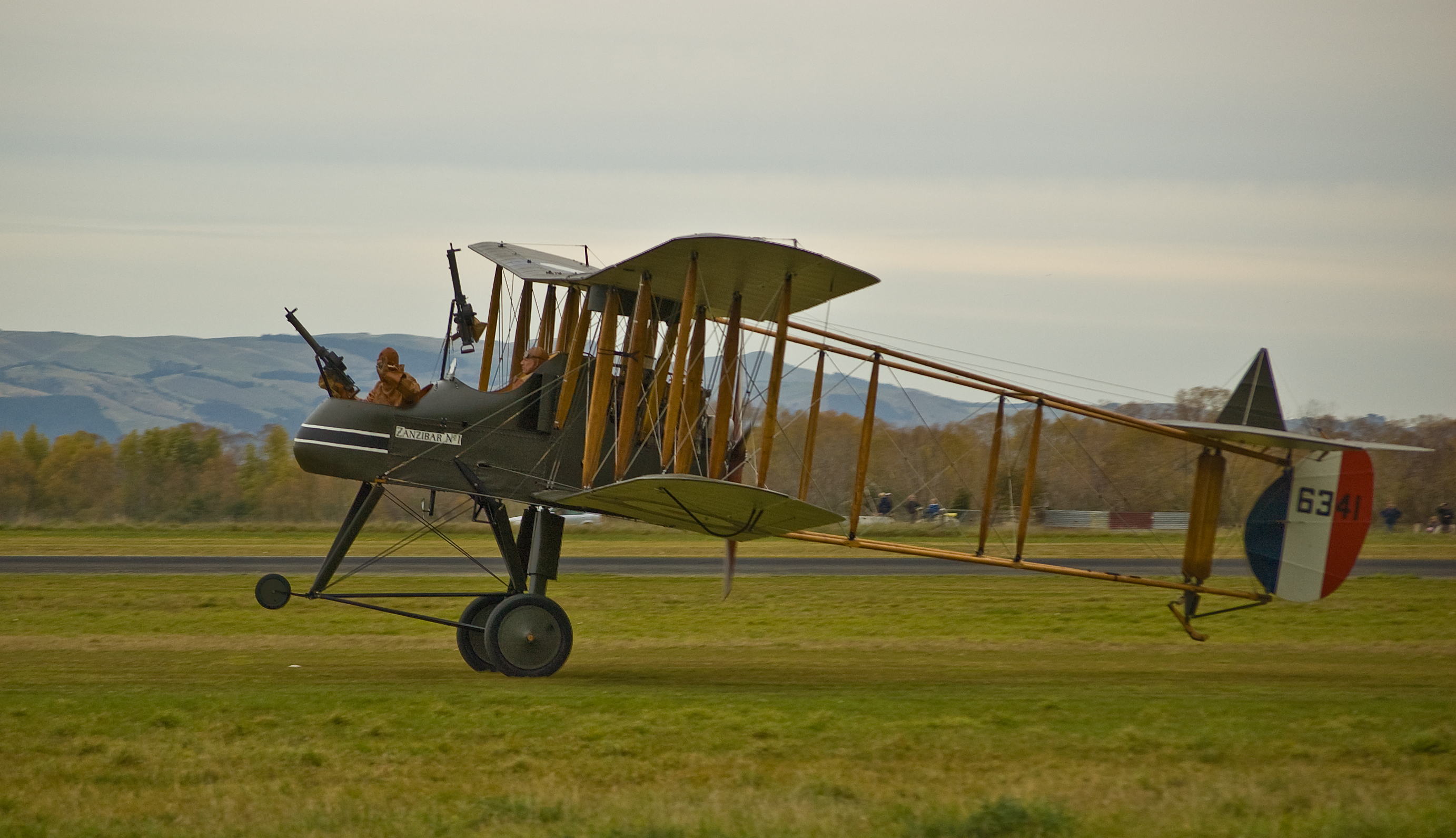
Royal Aircraft Factory F.E.2 of the type flown by 18 Squadron (Masterton, New Zealand, 25 April 2009 01)

Artillery-observation aircraft of 18 Squadron RFC went aloft soon after 4:00 a.m. on 22 May but found little activity on the German side. The 18 Squadron patrol was increased and 25 Squadron and 10 Squadron joined in; 10 Squadron aircraft later reporting that German artillery-fire was increasing, at which another aircraft carrying wireless was sent, which was the maximum number of aircraft that could be employed along the German attack front. All of the artillery-observation crews found active German guns and fighter aircraft, patrolling all day, drove off German aircraft attempting to reach the area; a tactical reconnaissance was flown during the late afternoon. The air was too hazy for balloon observation; the balloon was sent up at noon but there was still too much haze. The day was relatively quiet and British officers went forward to establish where the front line was, amidst the shell-holes and mine craters.

At a conference, Wilson decided that the 47th (1/2nd London) Division should control a counter-attack at 1:30 a.m. on 23 May, after the moon was up, by the 99th Brigade, 2nd Division, the 142nd Brigade, 47th (1/2nd London) Division and the 7th Brigade of the 25th Division. Haig intervened later that day to insist that no hasty attack be made and the counter-attack was postponed until dusk on 24 May. On the night of 22/23 May more artillery batteries were brought into action to fire on the new German positions and links to the rear. The 140th Brigade was withdrawn and replaced by the 99th Brigade and battalions of the 141st Brigade were relieved by part of the 142nd Brigade. The Germans kept up an intense bombardment of Zouave Valley, which made the reliefs more difficult and was apparently prompted by a British deserter, who told the Germans that a counter-attack would begin late on 22 May.

On 23 May the weather was still too hazy but artillery-observation aircraft took off at 3:30 a.m.;before conditions got worse, a reconnaissance on the First Army front found suspicious rail movements at Lens. In the afternoon, another conference was held, this time including Monro, Allenby, Wilson and two officers from General Headquarters (GHQ). The GHQ staff reiterated that Haig wanted a line established where it could be maintained and was willing to supply what guns, ammunition and troops were necessary. Wilson was keen to attack before the Germans could finish consolidating the captured ground and the army commanders agreed and the attack due that night was to go ahead. At 8:25 p.m. after a one-hour hurricane bombardment the attack was to re-capture the former support line and if possible the old front line, dig in and dig a new support line half-way back to the Talus des Zouaves. The main attack was to be made by the 99th Brigade and the 226th Field Company RE from Central Ave to Landwehr Ave, supported on the right by the 7th Brigade south of Central Ave and on the left by the 242nd Brigade from Landwehr Ave to Uhlan Ave. At 11:30 a.m. a German bombardment began on the British assembly area and increased in intensity at 2:00 p.m. and 6:00 p.m. but the British heavy guns could make little reply due to a shortage of ammunition.

Just before 8:00 p.m. German barrages began on the 99th Brigade front, between two battalions on the lower east slope of the Talus des Zouaves, on the Talus and on the communication trenches. The jumping-off trenches were destroyed, the 1st Battalion, royal Berkshire Regiment lost 100 men and after a platoon advanced and lost half its men, the attack was cancelled on local initiative. Communication with the rear was cut but a wireless stayed operational for long enough to inform the 99th Brigade and a liaison officer was sent to the 22nd Battalion, Royal Fusiliers on left flank and runners went forward immediately. B Company and its section of the 226th Field Company did not receive a message and attacked at 8:25 p.m., reaching the German front line, despite German machine-gun fire sweeping across no man's land. Officers went forward to lead the company back but found only dead and wounded. The attack by the battalions on the flanks of the 99th Brigade went ahead and the 3rd Battalion Worcestershire Regiment of the 7th Brigade captured the objective. On the left flank, the 1/24th London and 1/21st London bombed their way into the old support line and front line, were driven out, recaptured them and were pushed back a second time.

Officers from the 99th Brigade HQ got forward and the 1st Battalion King's Royal Rifle Corps (KRRC) took over from the 1st Royal Berkshire. After the German bombardment eased, the 99th Brigade officers decided that the attack could begin at 1:30 a.m. Munro was informed just after midnight on 24 May, who told Wilson that a piecemeal attack would make things worse. Wilson ordered that if the 99th Brigade had not attacked by 1:00 a.m. when the moon rose, it was only to go ahead if it was vital to take pressure off the 142nd Brigade; if the objective could not be reached, the brigade was to dig in where it was. The decision of the officer who cancelled the 1st Royal Berkshire attack was endorsed, since an attack would have been destroyed but in the early hours of the morning, the 99th Brigade managed to advance into line with the flanking brigades. To keep Lens and German road traffic under observation, 18 Squadron made a night reconnaissance from 1:30 to 2:30 a.m. on 24 May, which saw no illuminated transport but whose crew reported much German gunfire around Souchez and Givenchy. Another flight from 2:40 to 4:40 a.m. found only a few rail and troop movements. German aircraft flew again on 24 May and concentrated on the IV Corps front but were attacked as they appeared and driven off. The British reconnaissance reports were interpreted as evidence that the German attack had been intended to achieve only local objectives.

== Aftermath ==
=== Analysis ===
British casualties (19 December 1915 – June 1916)
| Month | Total |
|---|---|
| December | 5,675 |
| January | 9,974 |
| February | 12,182 |
| March | 17,814 |
| April | 19,886 |
| May | 22,418 |
| June | 37,121 |
| Total | 125,141 |

Haig thought that IV Corps had bungled and that a counter-attack big enough to ensure success would need another 40 British heavy artillery batteries. The offensive on the Somme was imminent and although Haig thought that the guns could be returned to the Somme in time, this would depend on the German reaction. Should the Germans continue operations on the ridge, the existing British positions would be at risk and there could be a delay in the return of the artillery. Although the Germans had gained observation over the British lines, they had not become untenable and Haig decided that the diversionary Attack on the Gommecourt Salient north of the Somme, was more important. On 17 May, Haig ordered the First Army to cancel its attack; IV Corps was to plan instead for a much bigger effort. The plans produced by IV Corps laid the basis for the scheme for the Canadian Corps attack at the Battle of Vimy Ridge (9–12 April 1917). Rupprecht was pleased about the large bag of prisoners (229) who were questioned by German interrogators and gave away much information on the orders of battle of the 47th (1/2nd London) and the 25th divisions, artillery-observation officer working methods, details about machine-guns and field fortifications.

In the first 1916 volume of the History of the Great War (1932), the official historian, James Edmonds, wrote that the Germans judged Unternehmen Schleswig-Holstein a complete success. Reserve Infantry Regiment 86 reported that there had been little British resistance but the other battalions noted hand-to-hand fighting and enfilade fire from the flanks. Consolidation of the captured ground had begun at once but some German companies had been unable to identify their objectives because of the state of the ground and had advanced too far. The troops too far forward had been caught in their own barrage and it took much of the night to bring the troops back to their objectives. Some companies were still out of position when dawn broke and it took until 7:00 p.m. on 22 May to find some of the objectives. Orders were given to stop consolidation during the day, to deny the British any clues as to the position of the new line. British guns extensively bombarded the German approaches and at noon, some German shells fell on the new front line. The German infantry fired green flares to get the artillery to increase the range but this gave away the line, which the British then subjected to massed heavy artillery-fire.

Edmonds wrote that the German attack showed that with plenty of artillery and observation over British positions, the Germans could capture a small part of the British defences. A British counter-attack would need a similar mass of artillery and if the guns had to be transferred from elsewhere, a counter-attack would have to wait, allowing the Germans more time to consolidate. The large amount of German artillery near the ridge and sapping forward from their new positions, led Allenby to suspect that the Vimy Ridge attack was a preliminary for an attack on Arras. With the Germans involved in offensive operations in Russia and at Verdun, Haig thought that a bigger attack was unlikely. (The 6th Army had a plan for a more ambitious attack but this needed another 12 divisions and 40 batteries of heavy artillery, which were not available.) Wilson thought that the British could leave things as they were, on the assumption that the Germans would be content to consolidate their gains. If the Germans intended to attack again, he wanted to conduct a similar operation against the Germans, to re-capture the top of the ridge and the German positions down the reverse slope as far as their mine entrances.

==== RFC report ====
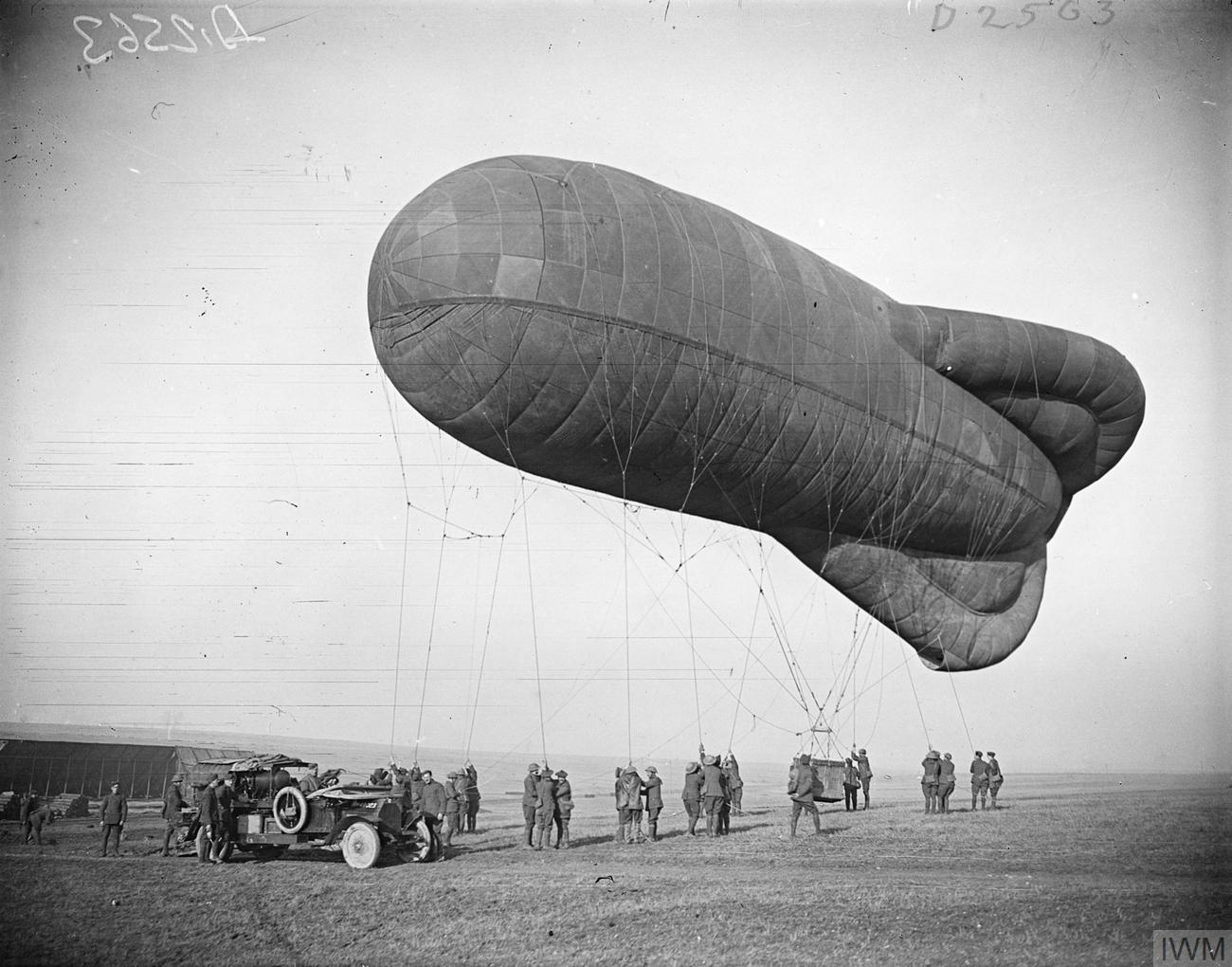
Caquot kite balloon with basket

On 27 May, a report comparing the effectiveness of the kite balloon with aircraft, found that balloon observation was better for reports of the situation in general, including that of artillery-fire. During night and day, the balloon observer could tell the British artillery group commander where German guns were in action, the areas under the most severe bombardment, areas of greatest activity, if gas had been released and the direction it moved. Aircraft were considered better for artillery ranging, being able to operate in conditions which were impossible for the balloon. During the day, air observers saw far more gun flashes than the crew of the observation balloon but could see none after dark. A balloon observer could spot flashes at night and sometimes name the battery, given the observer's knowledge of the area. The advantage of telephone communication with the balloon observer over Morse wireless from aeroplanes was judged considerable.

=== Casualties ===
In 1932, Edmonds recorded 1,344 German casualties; 615 men in the attack and 729 during British counter-attacks. British casualties in the 47th (1/2nd London) Division from 22 to 24 May were 1,571, 2nd Division casualties were 267 and the 7th Brigade (25th Division) had 637 casualties, a total of 2,475. In 1936, the official historians of Der Weltkrieg, the German official history, recorded that 300 British prisoners had been taken.

=== Subsequent operations ===
After 24 May, fighting on the ridge diminished and the Germans did not take over the former British support line. At a conference in the morning, Wilson ordered that the 47th (1/2nd London) Division be relieved by the 2nd Division the following night, ready for an attack on 3 June, with Walker in command. Troops of the 99th and 6th brigades edged forward and dug a new line 300 yd (270 m) up the slope from Zouave Valley. Mining in the Berthonval sector was not renewed and instead, German mine entrances were bombarded constantly by guns and trench mortars; tunnels were dug on the east slope of Zouave Valley as shelter for infantry in support and the situation did not change until the Canadian attack on 9 April 1917.
