= Beauchamp Doran =

British Army general (1860–1943)

Major-General Beauchamp Doran CB DL
- Portrait by Walter Stoneman, 1919
- Born: Beauchamp John Colclough Doran; 24 September 1860
- Died: 23 November 1943 (aged 83); Ely House, Wexford
- Relatives: General Sir John Doran (father)
- Military career
- Allegiance: United Kingdom
- Branch: British Army
- Service years: 1880–1920
- Rank: Major-General
- Commands: 25th Division; 68th Infantry Brigade; 8th Infantry Brigade; 1st Battalion, Royal Irish Regiment
- Conflicts: Mahdist War; Hazara Expedition of 1888; Tirah Expedition; Second Boer War; First World War
- Awards: Companion of the Order of the Bath; Mentioned in Despatches (9)

Major-General Beauchamp John Colclough Doran CB DL (24 September 1860 – 23 November 1943) was a British Army officer who served as a junior officer in the Second Boer War and later commanded an infantry brigade and division on the Western Front during the First World War.

== Early career ==
The eldest son of General Sir John Doran and Georgina Magrath, Beauchamp Doran was commissioned as a second lieutenant into the 16th Regiment of Foot in January 1880, before transferring to the 18th Foot (shortly to become the Royal Irish Regiment) later that month. He served with the 1st Battalion in the Second Anglo-Afghan War that same year, and was promoted to lieutenant on 1 July 1881. He later participated in the 1884–85 Nile Expedition, where he was mentioned in despatches and given a brevet promotion to major in May 1887, in the Hazara Expedition of 1888, and in the Miranzai Expedition of 1891, where he acted as brigade major.

In November 1891 Doran was appointed to a staff position overseeing musketry standards in the Bengal Army, transferring to the Punjab to take up the same post in 1895. In 1897, he was mentioned in despatches for his service in staff duties with the Kohat-Kurram expedition, and again in 1898 for his work as deputy assistant adjutant-general in the Tirah Expedition, both on the North-West Frontier of India. He had been promoted to brevet Major in November 1898. The following year he was back in Sudan, where he was in charge of the 9th Sudanese Battalion during operations leading to the defeat of the Khalifa in the Battle of Umm Diwaykarat in November 1899 (mentioned in despatches on 25 November 1899).

== Second Boer War ==
During the Second Boer War, which began in October 1899, Doran was first posted on staff duties, as a press censor, and then made a brigade major in January 1900. He commanded the garrison at Rustenburg in early 1900, for which he was promoted in January 1901 to the local rank of lieutenant colonel while in his position, and later oversaw the remount depot at Cape Town. He first saw field service in May 1901, when he was given command of a mounted column; that November, he was severely wounded and had a horse killed under him, but continued with the column until the end of the war. For his services during the war, he received a brevet promotion to lieutenant colonel on 29 November 1900, was twice mentioned in despatches, and was appointed a Companion of the Order of the Bath (CB).

== Inter-war years ==
Following the end of the war in May 1902, he returned to the United Kingdom in the SS Dunottar Castle, which arrived at Southampton in July 1902.

On his return, Doran married Mary MacGeough Bond, a widow; the couple would be married for thirty years before Mary's death, but with no children. In 1904, promoted to lieutenant colonel in September, he was posted to command his battalion, the 1st Royal Irish Regiment, with a brevet promotion to colonel in October 1905. He moved to staff duties in 1908, as assistant adjutant general (AAG) of Southern Command. He was promoted to colonel in March 1908 and in November of that year became an assistant quartermaster general (AQMG) of Irish Command.

He relinquished this assignment in March 1912 and was placed on half-pay. He returned to a field position in May, when he was promoted to the temporary rank of brigadier general and appointed as general officer commanding (GOC) of the 8th Infantry Brigade of the 3rd Division, then commanded by Major General Sir Henry Rawlinson.

== First World War ==
Doran was in command of the 8th Brigade when the First World War broke out in August 1914, and the British Expeditionary Force (BEF) was mobilised for service. His younger brother, Walter Robert Butler Doran, also commanded a brigade of the BEF; 17th Infantry Brigade in the 6th Division. He took the brigade to France and commanded it through the Retreat from Mons, the Battle of the Marne and the First Battle of the Aisne. On 20 October, one of his battalions – the 2nd Royal Irish Regiment – was surrounded during the Battle of La Bassée and effectively destroyed for lack of support; on 23 October, he was relieved of command of his brigade and sent home.

The following month, Doran was assigned to command the 68th Brigade, a group of volunteer New Army battalions in the 23rd Division. He was promoted to major-general in February 1915, and in May was given command of the 25th Division, another New Army formation, which was then completing its training in England. He took it to France that September, where it moved into a quiet sector of the line in late 1915. It remained in quiet sectors until May 1916, when it was moved south to Vimy Ridge, and was involved in defending against a German attack. Doran was relieved of command the following month, and transferred to home service as the commander of the Southern District in Ireland.

== Post-war ==
In 1919, and with the war now over due to the armistice of 11 November 1918, Doran was appointed to command No. 5 Area in France as part of the demobilisation of the British Armed Forces, and retired from the army in February 1920. Throughout the war, he had been mentioned in despatches four times.

== Retirement ==
In retirement, Doran was appointed the High Sheriff for the county of Wexford, serving from 1920 to 1921, and as a Deputy Lieutenant for the same county. He lived in Wexford through his retirement, at Ely House; during the unrest leading up to the outbreak of the Irish Civil War, in May 1922, he was arrested and beaten by men rumoured to represent the Provisional Government. After Mary's death in 1932, he remarried an American, Florence Fairchild. He died in 1943, aged 83.

== Notes ==
Military offices
Preceded by Francis Ventris	General Officer Commanding the 25th Division; May 1915 – June 1916	Succeeded by Guy Bainbridge
