= Desmond Doran =

British Army Intelligence Officer

- Born: 6 April 1913; Marylebone, London, England
- Died: 9 September 1946 (aged 33); Jaffa, Mandatory Palestine
- Burial place: Ramleh War Cemetery
- Relatives: Brigadier General Walter Doran (father); General Sir John Doran (grandfather)
- Military career
- Allegiance: United Kingdom
- Branch: British Army
- Rank: Major
- Service number: 274197
- Unit: Intelligence Corps
- Conflicts: Second World War; Palestine Emergency

John Desmond Beauchamp Doran (6 April 1913 – 9 September 1946) was a British Army Intelligence Officer who started his career in intelligence in the Secret Intelligence Service. He spent most of his career in the Middle East during the Second World War and the troubles that followed in the British Mandatory Palestine. Doran's family were a long established military family with roots in County Wexford, Ireland. His father, Walter Doran, was a senior British Army officer, as were his uncles and grandfather.

== Military career ==
Doran is recorded as being an officer in the Secret Intelligence Service before transferring to the army. He was commissioned in the Intelligence Corps as a lieutenant on 12 February 1943; his service number was 274197. He is recorded as having been on the staff of Security Intelligence Middle East (SIME), based in Cairo. His preferred titling was Desmond Doran whilst on government service.

At the end of the Second World War, Doran was transferred from Cairo to British Mandatory Palestine and became the Area Security Officer for Jaffa. His living quarters and office were located above another government office, located at the municipal boundary between Jewish Tel Aviv and the Arab port of Jaffa.

Doran died of wounds received in a terrorist attack on his quarters on 9 September 1946. He was buried at the Ramleh War Cemetery, now located in Israel. Major Doran had been specifically targeted by the Lehi because he was a threat to the organistation. Doran's Romanian-born wife Sanda and other military personnel were also killed or injured in the attack. Major Doran's obituary notice indicates that Sanda Doran did survive the injuries received in the attack.
