= 68th Brigade (United Kingdom) =

Military unit

The 68th Brigade was a formation of the British Army. It was raised as part of the new army also known as Kitchener's Army and assigned to the 23rd Division and served on the Western Front during the First World War.

== Formation ==
The infantry battalions did not all serve at once, but all were assigned to the brigade during the war.

- 10th (Service) Battalion, Northumberland Fusiliers
- 11th (Service) Battalion, Northumberland Fusiliers
- 12th (Service) Battalion, Durham Light Infantry
- 13th (Service) Battalion, Durham Light Infantry
- 68th Machine Gun Company
- 68th Trench Mortar Battery

== Commanders ==
Commanding officers
Rank	Name	Date appointed	Notes
Brigadier-General	G. H. Ovens	29 September 1914	
Brigadier-General	B. J. C. Doran	19 November 1914	Promoted major-general 15 February 1915
Colonel	G. A. Ashby	26 May 1915	Acting
Brigadier-General	E. Pearce-Serocold	3 June 1915	Sick 1 February 1916
Colonel	D. S. Stewart	1 February 1916	Acting
Brigadier-General	H. Page-Croft	8 February 1916	
Brigadier-General	G. N. Colvile	18 August 1916	
Major-General	A. R. Montagu-Stuart-Wortley	27 February 1917	
Brigadier-General	G. N. Colvile	31 March 1917	
Lieutenant-Colonel	M. G. H. Barker	27 September 1917	Acting
Brigadier-General	C. D. V. Cary-Barnard	14 October 1917	
