= The Monocle =

The Monocle may refer to:

- The Monocle (restaurant) in Washington, D.C.
- The Monocle Laughs, the 1964 French-Italian film
- The Monocle (musician), a stage name for Aurora Nealand
