= Eric Poole =

British Army officer

Family photograph of Eric Poole

Eric Skeffington Poole (20 January 1885 – 10 December 1916) was a British Army soldier who was the first commissioned officer to be executed by British military authority during World War I.

Originally from Canada, after serving on the Western Front for four months he was sentenced to death by court martial for desertion during the Battle of the Somme, and shot by a firing squad on 10 December 1916.

== Early life ==
Eric Poole was born on 20 January 1885 in Nova Scotia, Canada. From 1903 to 1905 he served in the ranks of the Canadian Army's 63rd Regiment, Halifax Rifles. He emigrated to England with his family at some date before 1914, residing in the town of Guildford, Surrey.

== First World War ==
After the outbreak of World War I, Poole voluntarily enlisted in October 1914 in the City of London with the Honourable Artillery Company, being assigned as a driver with its 'B' Reserve Battery. On 3 May 1915 he received a commission as an infantry subaltern with the 14th (Reserve) Battalion of the West Yorkshire Regiment, which he joined for training in England. Twelve months later he was transferred to the West Yorkshire Regiment's 11th (Service) Battalion, joining it on the Western Front with an officers reinforcement draft in May 1916 in the trenches at Souchez, near Lens.

On 7 July 1916, during the Battle of the Somme, whilst in action in the Contalmaison sector, he was buried by earth from a close-call shell impact, which also afflicted him with shell shock, and was medically evacuated from the line to recover in a field hospital. At the end of August 1916, he was medically discharged and rejoined his unit in the field at Martinpuich on the Somme, being placed in command of a platoon of 'C' Company, 11th West Yorks. On 5 October 1916, during a move by the battalion into frontline trenches at Flers, he absented himself without authority from the unit, but was found by military police on 7 October 1916, who placed him under arrest. In early November 1916, it was decided to try him by court-martial for desertion in the presence of the enemy whilst on active service.

=== Court-martial ===
On 24 November 1916, the court-martial was convened under officers from the 23rd Division. Six witnesses were called before it to give evidence, two of them speaking in his defence, including a doctor from the Royal Army Medical Corps, who testified that in his view Poole was in a psychological condition that had rendered him unfit to be placed in charge of a command at the time of his actions. Poole offered in his defence that, at the time of absenting himself from his platoon, he had been in a confused mental state, and had not realised the seriousness of his actions in military law. It was noted by the officers presiding over the proceedings that Poole had appeared to be suffering from a nervous collapse around the time that he had absented himself, and they found him guilty of the charge of desertion, and sentenced him to death by firing squad. On 3 December 1916 a British Army medical board examined him whilst under confinement, concluding that "he was of sound mind and capable of appreciating the nature of his actions". On 6 December 1916, the case file was placed before the Commander-in-Chief of the British Expeditionary Force, General Sir Douglas Haig, as the final authority in the matter, who confirmed the verdict and the sentence of death, noting in his private journal that it was "highly important that all ranks should realise that the law is the same for an officer as a Private".

=== Execution ===
On 10 December 1916, Poole was shot at dawn by a British Army firing squad at the town hall of Poperinghe in West Flanders, Belgium, at the age of 31 years. His body was buried at a British military cemetery there (which post-war was named 'Poperinge New Military Cemetery'). His name is also inscribed on a family grave in the churchyard of St Martha's near Chilworth, in the county of Surrey.

Poole was one of only two British military commissioned officers to be executed for purely military offences during the First World War.
