= John Doran (journalist) =

British journalist (born 1971)

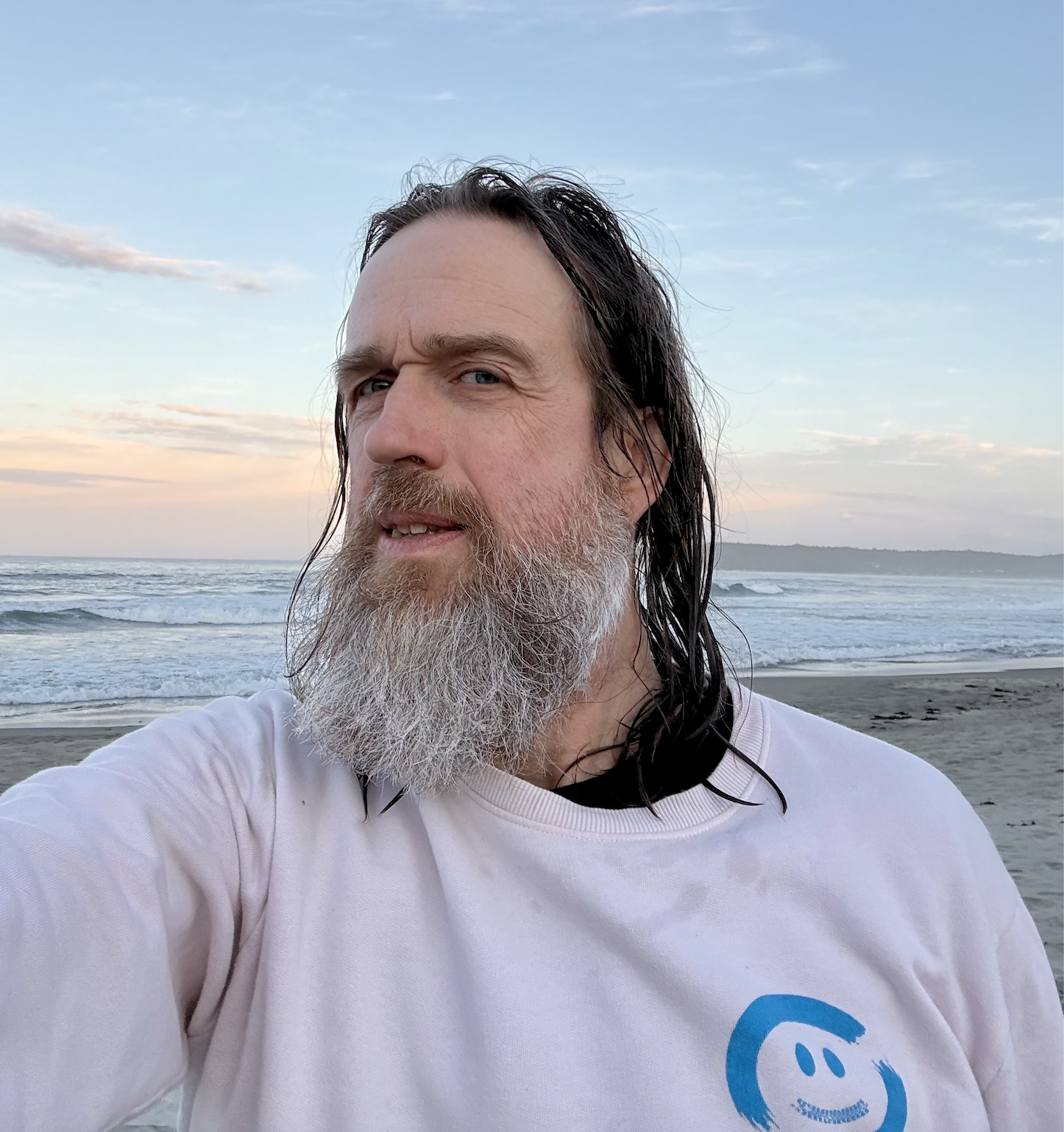
- Born: 1971 (age 54–55); Rainhill, England
- Occupations: Journalist; editor; author
- Years active: 1997–present
- Known for: Co-founding The Quietus
- Notable work: Jolly Lad (2015)

John Doran (born 1971) is a British music journalist, editor and author. He is a co-founder and editor of the online music publication The Quietus, and the author of the memoir Jolly Lad, published in 2015 by Strange Attractor Press.

== Early life ==
Doran was born in Rainhill, a village near St Helens in north-west England. He has described his upbringing as defined by a Catholic religious background, the influence of which he has said continued to shape him in adulthood. He briefly attended the University of Hull before leaving without completing his studies.

== Career ==
=== The Quietus ===
Doran co-founded The Quietus in 2008 with the journalist Luke Turner. The site was originally backed by Sky, which withdrew funding shortly after the start of the financial crisis of 2007–2008 and before the site had been fully designed; Doran and Turner continued the publication independently from a desk shared with a games designer in Truman Brewery in east London, and later from premises in Stoke Newington shared with the music newspaper The Stool Pigeon. Writing in Huck in 2018, Daniel Dylan Wray described the publication as having maintained editorial independence over its first decade and as having given early platforms to writers including Laura Snapes, Lauren Martin and Emily Mackay.

In a 2018 interview marking the site's tenth anniversary, Doran stated that the editors had not paid themselves for the first two years of the site's operation, and that their first wage from the publication had been £50 a week. He also said the publication had since come to rely on reader patronage following changes to online advertising revenue.

=== Other journalism ===
Doran has written for The Guardian, Vice, NME, Metal Hammer, Classic Rock and Prog. The Skinny described his work as marked by a willingness to write negative reviews during a period it characterised as one of widespread positive criticism in music journalism. Doran's regular Vice column Menk, commissioned to cover subjects other than music, was the basis for his memoir Jolly Lad. In 2017, Doran named a new music column in The Quietus "New Weird Britain", a term he used for what he described as radical music emerging in the margins of contemporary Britain.

=== Broadcasting ===
In 2019, Doran presented New Weird Britain, a BBC Radio 4 series made with the producer Alannah Chance, which examined musical counterculture outside the United Kingdom's major cities. With the producer Barney Rowntree, he made The Cult of Aphex Twin, a BBC Radio 4 documentary about the musician Aphex Twin, which won the Gold Medal for best documentary at the 2019 New York Festivals Radio Awards.

Doran has presented editions of the BBC Radio 3 programme Late Junction and appeared on it as a guest. On BBC Radio 6 Music, he has presented The Freakier Zone and appeared as a guest on Mary Anne Hobbs's programme.

Doran presented British Masters, a filmed interview series for Vice's music channel Noisey, in which his subjects included Liam Gallagher, Dizzee Rascal, Cosey Fanni Tutti, Mark E. Smith and Johnny Marr. He has also conducted filmed interviews for Vice with figures including the musician Nick Cave.

=== Jolly Lad (2015) ===
Doran's memoir Jolly Lad was published on 1 June 2015 by Strange Attractor Press. The book deals with his account of alcoholism and drug use between the ages of 13 and 37, his recovery, and his subsequent work as a music journalist. Discussing the book with New Statesman's Colm McAuliffe, Doran described it as an attempt to address a form of habitual drinking among people who maintain employment and family life, and said he had wanted to avoid framing the book as a recovery narrative endorsing any particular treatment programme.

To accompany the book's release, Quietus Phonographic Corporation, the record label associated with The Quietus, released a compilation of musical collaborations. Doran toured with the Norwegian band Årabrot to promote the book in May 2015, with performances in Manchester, Liverpool and Salford.

==== Reception ====
Jolly Lad was reviewed in a range of British publications. The Independent reviewed the book in 2015, describing it as "a wonderful tale". A review in HuffPost UK also covered the book. In Louder Than War, the reviewer described the book as drawing on Doran's earlier Vice column and as an account combining elements of memoir, social observation and music writing. In 2020, the writer Darran Anderson recommended the book in The Guardian, describing it as "the most painfully perceptive book I've ever read about addiction".

== Other work ==
Doran is a co-founder, with the publisher Mark Pilkington of Strange Attractor Press, of Acid Horse, an annual music festival held at the Barge Inn at Honeystreet in Wiltshire. On 8 July 2023, Doran and the former snooker world champion Steve Davis played a DJ set at Blur's concert at Wembley Stadium, appearing on the bill alongside Jockstrap, Sleaford Mods and Self Esteem.

He has also produced playlists and selections for several broadcasters and publications, including a YouTube playlist published by Louder Than War to accompany the release of Jolly Lad, and a BBC feature in which he selected ten record sleeve notes.

== Personal life ==
Doran has spoken publicly about his recovery from alcoholism and drug addiction, which he has dated to 2008. He has lived in Stamford Hill, north London, and has a son.

== Bibliography ==
- Jolly Lad. London: Strange Attractor Press, 2015. ISBN 9781907222337
