= Robert Doran =

Robert Doran may refer to:

- Robert Doran (born 1940), a scholar of Judaism and Christianity in antiquity
- Robert M. Doran (1939–2021), a Canadian theologian
- Robert S. Doran (born 1937), an American mathematician
- Robert W. Doran (1944–2018), a New Zealand computer scientist
- Bob Doran, a character in the James Joyce novel Ulysses

== See also ==
- Jim Doran (James Robert Doran), American football player
- Walter Robert Butler Doran (1861–1945), British army officer
