= The Quietus =

British online pop culture magazine

- Website type: Music, pop culture magazine
- Available in: English
- Creators: John Doran; Luke Turner
- Website: thequietus.com
- Registration: No
- Launched: Summer 2008
- Current status: Active

The Quietus is a British online music and pop culture magazine founded by John Doran and Luke Turner. The site is an editorially independent publication led by Doran with a group of freelance journalists and critics.

== Content ==
The Quietus primarily features writings on music and films, as well as interviews with a wide range of notable artists and musicians. The magazine also occasionally includes pieces on literature, graphic novels, architecture, and TV series. The website is edited by John Doran, who claims that it caters for "the intelligent music fan between the age of 21 and, well, 73". Its staff list includes former writers for publications such as Melody Maker, Select, NME and Q, including journalist David Stubbs, current BBC Radio 6 DJ Steve Lamacq, Professor Simon Frith and Simon Price among others. It is owned by Mick Hucknall of Simply Red, who also contributes.

Among its best known columns is its "Baker's Dozen," in which artists select 13 personal favourite albums. Content from the site's interviews have been used by other national and international media outlets. The site's news has been cited by publications from Russia to Brazil and Indonesia. The Quietus also organises independent music gigs in tandem with entertainment venues.

== Accolades ==
In 2008, The Quietus won Student Publication Choice at the Record of the Day Awards. In 2009, the site won Best Digital Publication at the same awards ceremony, where Doran won Live Review Writer of the Year. The same year, it was chosen as one of The 25 Best Music Websites by The Independent.
