= Monocle (disambiguation) =

A monocle is a corrective lens used to correct the vision in only one eye.

Monocle may also refer to:

- Monocle (satirical magazine), American satirical magazine, published irregularly from the late 1950s until the mid-1960s
- Monocle (brand) a news and lifestyle magazine, published since 2007, and media brand

- Monocle Radio, radio station for Monocle magazine

- Monocle (character), a DC Comics supervillain
- Monocle (Transformers), a character from Transformers: Cybertron
- Monocle (musician), a stage name for Aurora Nealand

== See also ==
- Monocular
- The Monocle (disambiguation)
