= The Monocle (restaurant) =

Restaurant

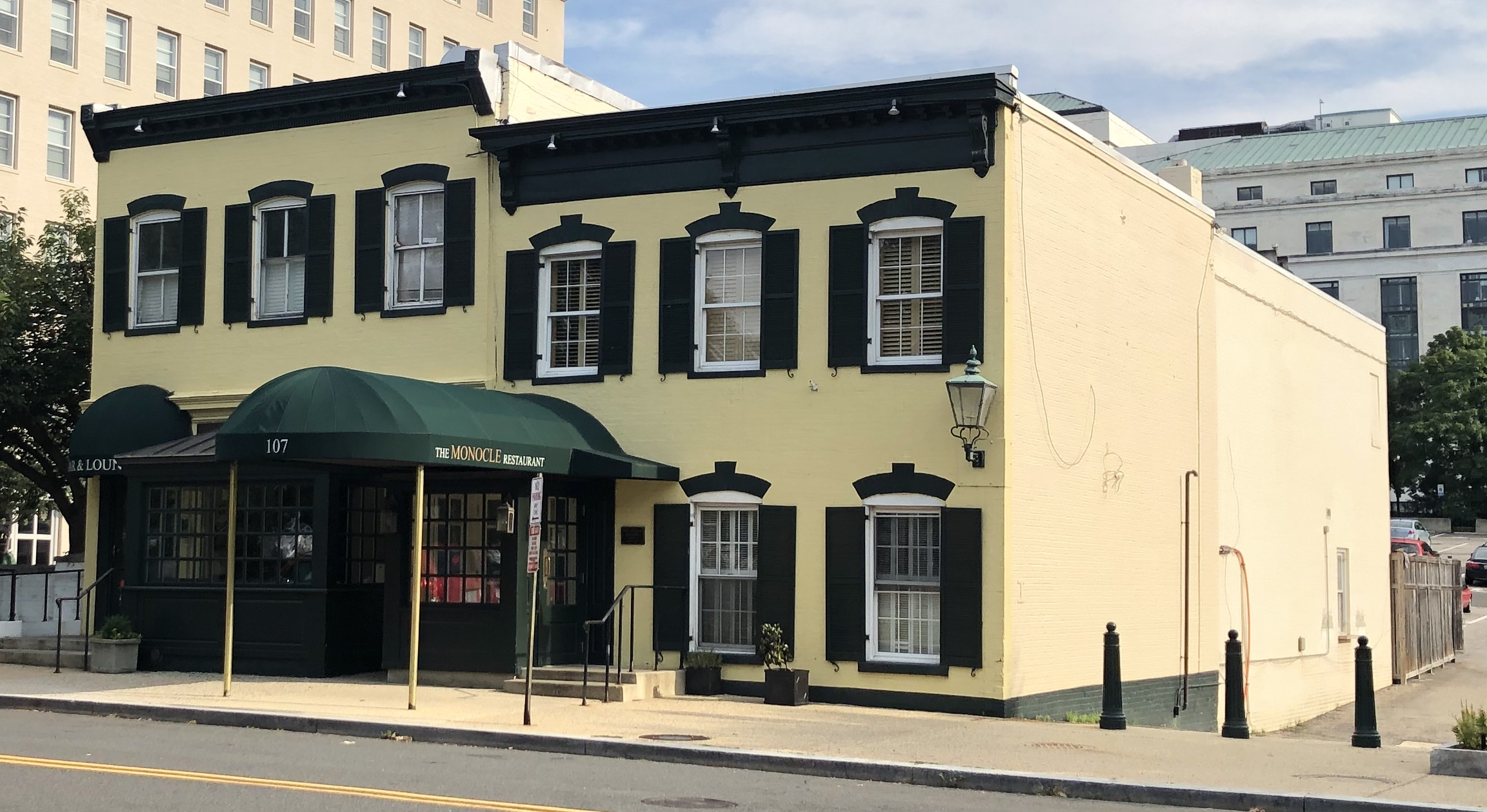
- The Monocle restaurant
- Interactive map of The Monocle

Restaurant information
- Established: September 1960
- Owners: John and Vasiliki Valanos
- Previous owners: Constantine and Helen Valanos
- Location: 107 D Street NE, Washington, D.C., 20002
- Coordinates: 38.89457°N 77.00517°W
- Website: https://themonocle.com

The Monocle is a restaurant in the Capitol Hill neighborhood of Washington, D.C.

== History ==
The Monocle was founded in September 1960 by Constantine "Connie" Valanos and his wife Helen, and was considered Capitol Hill's first "tablecloth restaurant". D.C. law at the time required that alcohol only be served to patrons sitting at a table, so a member of Congress took it upon himself to change the rules to allow for bars and barstool seating in the District.

Management of the restaurant was taken over by the Valanoses' son, John Valanos and his wife Vasiliki in 1989. Helen Valanos died in 2005, and Connie in 2012.

The restaurant comprises two adjoining federal row houses on D Street NE, originally built in 1885. Prior to housing the Monocle it was home to the Station View Spaghetti House. The building is owned by the federal government.

== Connection to U.S. politics ==
Given its proximity to the United States Senate and being one of only a few restaurants near the Capitol, The Monocle quickly became a meeting point for members of congress and special interest lobbyists. The Monocle welcomes members of all political parties and considers itself strictly non-partisan.

A 1961 column in The Washington Post referred to The Monocle as a "dandy place to rubberneck and dine." A 1985 article about the National Corn Growers Association notes the Monocle as a popular place to meet with peers to coordinate strategies, and according to one anecdote, get tipped off by Senate staff in the Monocle parking lot. Former vice president Walter Mondale once called the restaurant a place "where laws are debated, where policies are set, where the course of world history is changed."

=== Watergate ===
The Monocle made an appearance in the testimony of Gerald Alch, former attorney for James W. McCord Jr., during the 1973 Watergate hearings. Alch and McCord discussed the CIA's involvement in the cover-up at the Monocle in December 1972.

=== Present day ===
It's not uncommon for industry lobbying groups and the companies they represent to pay for meals and events at The Monocle. In 2012 former senator Russ Feingold was quoted as saying, "It's not that lobbyists themselves give huge campaign contributions, it's that they become conduits for collecting large contributions. So in Washington typically a member of the House or Senate will be having, quote, a ‘fundraiser’, and the lobbyist will bring in a few people and a bunch of checks, and this, you know, this is the same lobbyist who is arranging to have meetings to talk to this guy about policy in his office the next day—hopefully they're not doing the same thing in the office because that's illegal—but I mean, it's across the street. You know, at the 201 Club or the Monocle."

Despite the modernization of other aspects of conducting federal business, the Monocle continues to be a location for exchanging ideas and influence. A government relations specialist is quoted in 2018 as saying, "How we do government relations now is essentially the same way we have always done it: people having drinks at the Monocle and chitchatting and exchanging paper."

One byproduct of the steady stream of notable patrons is that the Valanos family has been able to amass a large number of autographed headshots. The restaurant regularly has 300-400 of the more than 1,000 photographs on display, in a collection that is continually in rotation as politics evolve.
