= Frank Doran =

Frank Doran may refer to:

- Frank Doran (aikido) (1932–2026), American aikido teacher
- Frank Doran (American politician) (1839–1914), American politician, mayor of St. Paul, Minnesota
- Frank Doran (British politician) (1949–2017), Scottish Member of UK Parliament
