= USS Bagley (DD-185) =

Wickes-class destroyer

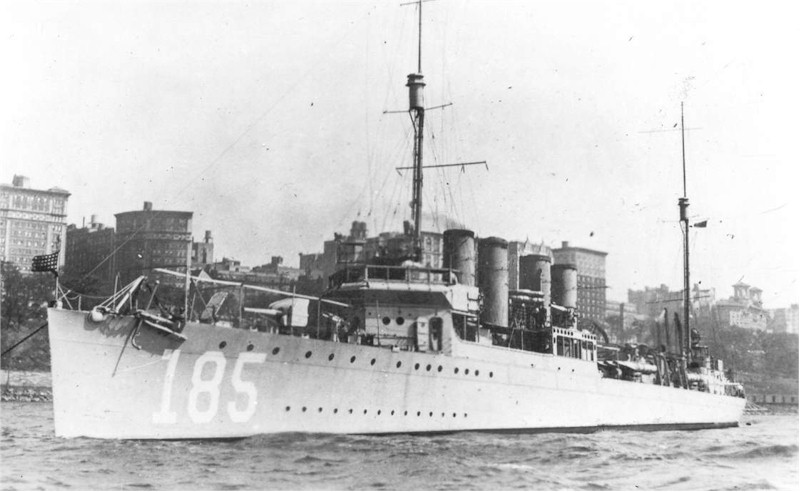
- USS Bagley (DD-185)

History

United States
- Name: Bagley
- Namesake: Worth Bagley
- Builder: Newport News Shipbuilding and Dry Dock Company, Newport News, Virginia
- Cost: $1,253,363 (hull and machinery)
- Laid down: 11 May 1918
- Launched: 19 October 1918
- Commissioned: 27 August 1919
- Decommissioned: 12 July 1922
- Namesake: John James Doran
- Renamed: USS Doran, 22 December 1939 (following the naming of USS Bagley (DD-386))
- Recommissioned: 17 June 1940
- Decommissioned: 22 September 1940
- Stricken: 8 January 1941
- Identification: DD-185
- Fate: Transferred to United Kingdom, 22 September 1940

United Kingdom
- Name: HMS St. Mary's
- Commissioned: 22 September 1940
- Decommissioned: February 1944
- Fate: Scrapped, 1945

General characteristics
- Class & type: Wickes-class destroyer
- Displacement: 1,213 tons
- Length: 314 ft 5 in (95.83 m)
- Beam: 31 ft 8 in (9.65 m)
- Draft: 9 ft 4 in (2.84 m)
- Speed: 35 kn (65 km/h; 40 mph)
- Complement: 122 officers and enlisted
- Armament: 4 x 4 in (102 mm)/50 guns; 2 x 3 in (76 mm)/23 guns; 12 x 21 inch (533 mm) torpedo tubes.

The second USS Bagley (DD–185) was a Wickes-class destroyer in the United States Navy following World War I. She was renamed USS Doran and later transferred to the Royal Navy as HMS St. Mary's (I-12), a Town-class destroyer.

== Service history ==
=== As USS Bagley and USS Doran ===
Named for Ensign Worth Bagley, she was launched 19 October 1918 by Newport News Shipbuilding and Dry Dock Company, Newport News, Virginia; sponsored by Mrs. Adelaide Worth Bagley, mother of Ensign Bagley, commissioned 27 August 1919 and reported to the Atlantic Fleet.

Between August 1919 and July 1920 Bagley served in destroyer Flotillas 1, 3, and 8 participating in maneuvers and training in the Atlantic and Caribbean. She was placed in reserve commission 16 July 1920 and out of commission at Philadelphia 12 July 1922. During 25 April 1932 – 20 April 1934 she was on loan to the Coast Guard.

The name Bagley was dropped 31 May 1935 and, until 1939, she was referred to as DD-185 (ex-Bagley). She was renamed Doran 22 December 1939, for John James Doran. Recommissioned 17 June 1940, she reported to the Atlantic Squadron. Doran served with the Squadron until 22 September 1940, when she was decommissioned at Halifax, Nova Scotia, and transferred under the Destroyers for Bases Agreement to the United Kingdom.

=== As HMS St. Mary's ===
She was renamed HMS St. Mary's and arrived at Belfast, Northern Ireland, 8 October 1940. Assigned to the permanent escort force of the 1st Minelaying Squadron, she arrived on the west coast of Scotland 31 October and took part in some of the early minelaying operations in Denmark Strait, between Iceland and Greenland. She also escorted a number of convoys. During 1941 she took part in most of the Squadron's minelaying operations and rendered service in the defense of shipping. On 29 August 1941, she collided with the transport Royal Ulsterman off the west coast of Scotland and was in Salford Docks until December.

St. Mary's carried out minelaying and shipping defense duties in 1942 and 1943. In February 1944 she was paid off in the Tyne and remained there until the end of the war, when she was scrapped.
