= Walter Doran (British Army officer) =

British Army general (1861–1945)

Brigadier-General Walter Doran CB DSO
- Born: 15 December 1861; Lahore, Bengal, India
- Died: 6 February 1945 (aged 83); Down House, Redlynch, Wiltshire, England
- Relatives: General Sir John Doran (father); Major General Beauchamp Doran (brother); Desmond Doran (son)
- Military career
- Allegiance: United Kingdom
- Branch: British Army
- Service years: 1881–1919
- Rank: Brigadier-General
- Commands: 17th Infantry Brigade; 2nd Battalion, Prince of Wales's Leinster Regiment
- Conflicts: Anglo-Egyptian War; Mahdist War; Second Boer War; First World War
- Awards: Companion of the Order of the Bath; Distinguished Service Order; Mentioned in Despatches; Military Order of Savoy (Italy)

Brigadier-General Walter Robert Butler Doran, CB, DSO (15 December 1861 – 6 February 1945) was a senior British Army officer who served with distinction in the Second Boer War, commanding an infantry battalion. He also served as an infantry brigade commander during the First World War.

== Early life and military career ==
William Doran was recorded as being at the Royal Military College, Sandhurst on 3 April 1881. He was commissioned as a subaltern in Her Majesty's Royal Irish Regiment in May 1882. He deployed with his regiment to Egypt and took part in the Anglo-Egyptian War and later the Sudan Expedition of 1884–85.

Doran attended the Staff College, Camberley from 1893 to 1894. In late November 1899 he took part in the operations leading to the defeat of the Khalifa, and for his services in the Sudan he received the brevet rank of lieutenant colonel on 14 March 1900.

Doran took part in the Second Boer War. He was promoted to major in February 1901 and, upon transferring from his regiment to the Prince of Wales's Leinster Regiment (Royal Canadians) as a lieutenant colonel, took command of a battalion.

After commanding a battalion of his new regiment, during which time he was promoted to brevet colonel in May 1905, Doran was placed on half-pay in August 1908, after relinquishing command of the battalion, and promoted to colonel on the same date. In July 1909 he took over from Brigadier General Francis Inglefield the position of general staff officer, grade 1 (GSO1) of the 5th Division, then serving with Irish Command. During his time on the staff he was, in June 1910, appointed a Companion of the Order of the Bath in the 1910 Birthday Honours. In April 1912, after being promoted to the temporary rank of brigadier general, he assumed command of the 6th Division's 17th Infantry Brigade.

== First World War ==
Doran took command of the 17th Infantry Brigade, which included his previous regiment as part of its order of battle. The brigade deployed to France as part of the 6th Division in the British Expeditionary Force (BEF). His brother Beauchamp Doran was also a brigadier general, commanding the 8th Infantry Brigade at the same time. He was at some point relieved of his command of the brigade, reverting to his substantive rank of colonel but was promoted once again to temporary brigadier general when he succeeded Major General Frederick McCracken as an inspector of infantry.

Doran later briefly commanded the 88th Infantry Brigade and was later awarded the Military Order of Savoy on 12 September 1919 by the then Kingdom of Italy.

== Later life ==
Doran retired as an honorary brigadier general on 4 March 1919. The Dorans owned Down House in Redlynch, near Salisbury. The house still stands, although it is now reduced in size. Doran died at Down House on 6 February 1945. An obituary appeared in The Times on 9 February.

== Family ==
Doran married Elsie Teichmann in 1911. The couple had one son: John Desmond Beauchamp Doran (known as Desmond), who went on to join the Secret Intelligence Service and later the Intelligence Corps in the Second World War. Desmond Doran died in 1946 in Palestine during a Zionist terrorist attack on his house in Tel Aviv/Jaffa. Elsie Doran died at Down House in 1966.
