= Michael Doran =

Michael Doran may refer to:

- Michael Doran (politician) (1827–1915), businessman and politician in Minnesota
- Michael Scott Doran (born 1962), scholar of Middle Eastern politics
