= 17th Infantry Brigade (United Kingdom) =

17th Brigade 17th Infantry Brigade
- 17th Infantry Brigade Formation Sign.
- Active: 1914–1918; 1939–1945
- Country: United Kingdom
- Branch: British Army
- Type: Infantry
- Size: Brigade
- Part of: 8th Infantry Division; 6th Infantry Division
- Engagements: First World War; Second World War

Commanders
- Notable commanders: Montagu Stopford; Dudley Ward

The 17th Infantry Brigade was an infantry brigade formation of the British Army which provided active service in the Second Boer War and both the First and Second World Wars. It was mainly composed of Regular Army battalions.

== History ==
=== Second Boer War ===
During the Second Boer War, the 17th brigade was active in South Africa as part of the 8th Division from early 1900 until the war ended in 1902. It was under the command of Major-General John Edward Boyes, and included the following battalions:

- 2nd Battalion Manchester Regiment, 1st Battalion South Staffordshire Regiment, 1st Battalion Worcestershire Regiment, 2nd Battalion West Kent Regiment

=== First World War ===
The 17th Brigade was originally part of the 6th Division during the First World War, The commander was Brigadier General W.R.B. Doran CB DSO on mobilisation. It was transferred to the 24th Division, a New Army division, on 14 October 1915. The brigade saw service mainly on the Western Front.

==== Order of battle ====
===== On mobilisation - August 1914 =====
Component units included:

- 1st Battalion, Royal Fusiliers (City of London Regiment)
- 1st Battalion, Prince of Wales's (North Staffordshire Regiment)
- 2nd Battalion, Prince of Wales's Leinster Regiment (Royal Canadians)
- 3rd Battalion, Rifle Brigade (Prince Consort's Own)

===== November 1918 =====
Component units included:

- 8th (Service) Battalion, Queen's (Royal West Surrey Regiment)
- 1st Battalion, Royal Fusiliers (City of London Regiment)
- 3rd Battalion, Rifle Brigade (Prince Consort's Own)
- 17th Trench Mortar Battery

=== Second World War ===
The Brigade served with the 5th Infantry Division through most of the Second World War. On 5 May 1942 it was part of Force 121 in the Battle of Madagascar. After this, the 17th Infantry Brigade served in the Allied invasion of Sicily with the British Eighth Army and the Italian Campaign, before taking part in the closing stages of the campaign in Germany.

==== Order of battle ====
Component units included:

- 2nd Battalion, Royal Scots Fusiliers
- 2nd Battalion, Northamptonshire Regiment
- 2nd Battalion, Seaforth Highlanders (to 30 March 1940)
- 6th Battalion, Seaforth Highlanders (from 30 March 1940)
- 156th (Lanarkshire Yeomanry) Field Regiment, Royal Artillery
