= USS Doran (DD-634) =

Gleaves-class destroyer

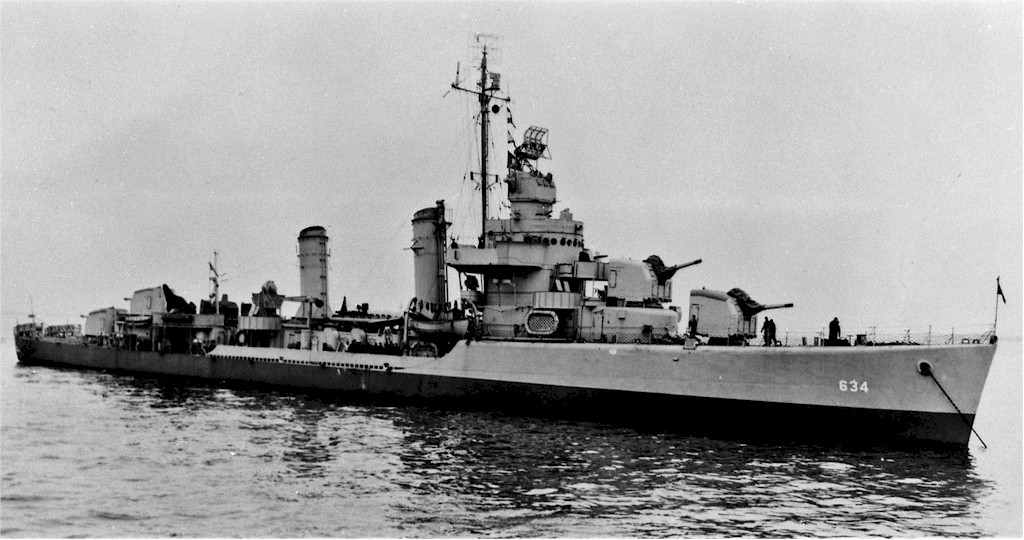
- USS Doran on 1 March 1943, location unknown.

History

United States
- Name: USS Doran
- Namesake: John James Doran
- Builder: Boston Navy Yard
- Laid down: 14 June 1941
- Launched: 10 December 1941
- Commissioned: 4 August 1942
- Identification: DD-634
- Reclassified: DMS-41, 30 May 1945
- Decommissioned: 29 January 1947
- Stricken: 15 January 1972
- Fate: Sold 27 August 1973 and broken up for scrap.

General characteristics
- Class & type: Gleaves-class destroyer
- Displacement: 1,630 tons
- Length: 348 ft 3 in (106.15 m)
- Beam: 37 ft 0 in (11.28 m)
- Draft: 11 ft 10 in (3.61 m)
- Propulsion: 50,000 shp (37,000 kW); 4 boilers; 2 propellers
- Speed: 37.4 knots (69 km/h)
- Range: 6,500 nmi (12,000 km; 7,500 mi) at 12 kn (22 km/h; 14 mph)
- Complement: 16 officers, 260 enlisted
- Armament: 4 × 5 in (127 mm)/38 caliber DP guns; 4 × 40 mm (1.6 in) guns; 7 × 20 mm (0.79 in) AA guns, 5 × 21 in (533 mm) torpedo tubes (5 Mark 15 torpedoes); 6 × depth charge projectors, 2 × depth charge tracks

USS Doran (DD-634), a Gleaves-class destroyer, was the second ship of the United States Navy to be named for Medal of Honor recipient John James Doran.

Doran was launched on 10 December 1941 by Boston Navy Yard; sponsored by Mrs. P. J. Hurley sister of Chief Master-at-Arms Doran, and commissioned on 4 August 1942.

== Service history ==
Doran sailed from Norfolk, Virginia on 23 October 1942 screening transports for the invasion landings at Safi, French Morocco, 8 November. Two days later while on patrol she investigated a beached submarine which turned out to be French. The submarine had escaped from Casablanca and had been abandoned after suffering several bombing attacks by American aircraft. Doran returned to Norfolk 24 November.

Between 12 December 1942 and 28 April 1943 Doran made three voyages from New York and Norfolk to arrive at Oran on 22 June, and on 5 July got underway to Casablanca. She sailed from Norfolk again 8 June, for the invasion of Sicily, screening transports off Scoglitti and providing fire support for the landings 10 July. She continued to serve in this operation with escort and patrol duty between Bizerte, Tunisia, and Sicilian ports until 21 August. Six days later she sailed from Casablanca for the United States, arriving at New York 14 September.

Returning to convoy duty, Doran made five voyages between Boston and New York and ports in the United Kingdom between 22 October 1943 and 1 May 1944. She sailed from Norfolk 17 May to return to the Mediterranean where she screened transports from Oran to Naples and conducted exercises and antisubmarine patrols off Oran and Gibraltar. She returned to New York 22 August and made one convoy voyage to Liverpool from 6 October to 1 November before sailing to the Panama Canal Zone as escort for the aircraft carrier Randolph.

From 13 January to 26 April 1945 Doran escorted two convoys to Oran, then at Charleston, South Carolina, began conversion to a high-speed minesweeper. She was reclassified DMS-41, 30 May 1945. Her conversion and shakedown completed, she sailed from Norfolk 2 July for a month of training at San Diego, called at Pearl Harbor, and reached Okinawa on 7 October. She swept mines in the Yellow Sea and served on escort and courier duty at Shanghai, China, until 3 January 1946, when she sailed for Wakanoura Wan escorting the ships of Mine Squadron 11 (MineRon 11) to buoy-laying duty. Doran remained on duty in Japanese waters until 11 March when she sailed from Yokosuka for San Francisco, arriving the last day of the month. She was placed out of commission in reserve at San Diego 29 January 1947. She was reclassified DD-634, 15 July 1966.

Doran received three battle stars for World War II service.
