= 23rd Division (United Kingdom) =

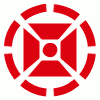
- 23rd Division sign as used on signboards.
- Active: September 1914 – March 1919
- Country: United Kingdom
- Branch: British Army
- Type: Infantry
- Engagements: World War I; Battle of the Somme; Battle of Albert; Battle of Pozières; Battle of Flers–Courcelette; Battle of Morval; Battle of Le Transloy; Battle of Messines; Third Battle of Ypres; Battle of the Menin Road Ridge; Battle of Polygon Wood; First Battle of Passchendaele; Battle of Asiago Plateau; Battle of Vittorio Veneto

The 23rd Division was an infantry division of the British Army raised in 1914 in the Great War as part of Kitchener's Army. The division was sent to France in August 1915 under the command of Major-General Sir James Melville Babington C.B. C.M.G. During the war the division fought on the Western Front until October 1917 when it moved to the Italian Front. It remained in Italy and was disbanded by March 1919.

== History ==
=== 1914–1915 ===
==== Formation and training ====
The division formed part of Kitchener's third New Army, with concentration of units beginning on 16 September, the 68th Brigade at Bullswater and the 69th and 70th brigades, together with Royal Engineers companies at Frensham. It was commanded by Maj. Gen. James Melville Babington, who was at first hampered by a lack of clerks, cooks and a means of communicating orders, other than verbally. Together with other New Army divisions, uniforms of any description were not received until mid October, by which time many of the civilian clothes the men wore were reduced to rags. Division artillery began to be formed in early November. Initial weapons training was carried out with small numbers of Lee-Metford rifles and French 90mm guns. The division was concentrated at Aldershot in January 1915, where the division train was formed. Khaki uniforms were received at the end of February and the division moved to the Shorncliffe area in March and continued training. In May the division moved to Borden where 18-pounders and 4.5 inch howitzers were issued to the division artillery and in June the Infantry received its rifles. On 16 August the division was inspected by the King and next day received its orders for embarkation.

==== France ====
On arrival in France the division was concentrated near St Omer with the Guards and the 24th divisions, forming XI Corps, where it continued training. In early September the division was transferred to III Corps and in mid September took over part of the front line in the nursery sector of Armentières where, because of the high water table, much of the front line was defined by breastworks.

The 103rd and 105th Artillery brigades were lent to the 8th Division for a diversionary attack in support of the Battle of Loos in late September and won the division's first bravery awards, the rest of the division provided a smoke barrage.

In early October the 70th Brigade was exchanged with the (regular army) 24th Brigade of the 8th Division, with two battalions in it being exchanged with battalions in the other brigades (the 2nd East Lancashire Regiment going to the 68th Brigade, the 1st Sherwood Foresters to the 69th Brigade and the 13th Durham Light Infantry and the 10th Duke of Wellington's Regiment replacing them in the 24th Brigade, a similar process happening in the 8th Division). This not only gave the service battalions the benefit of the regulars experience but also gave the regulars a boost in morale by association with fresh troops.

They (the 23rd) were never happier unless they were patrolling No Man's Land, sniping or arranging some special 'hate' in the form of trench mortaring or rifle-grenading. They also introduced the 8th Division to the Lewis gun, and we were greatly impressed with its usefulness.

— Lt Col B. C. M. Western, 8th Division,

The division's first V.C was won on 4 November by Pte Thomas Kenny of 13th D.L.I., rescuing an officer in heavy fog after a patrol was ambushed. On the night of the last day of the year the division launched its first trench raid with 116 officers and men of the 10th Northumberland Fusiliers and a party of Royal Engineers.

=== 1916 ===
In late February the division was relieved by the 34th Division, and after a short rest was sent to the front near Souchez, south of Lens. Here the division's artillery was used to support the 47th (1/2nd London) Division in early April as a feint and again in late May to counter a German advance. In mid June the division was relieved by the 47th Division and by the end of the month was in reserve at Rainneville behind the Somme front.

==== Somme ====
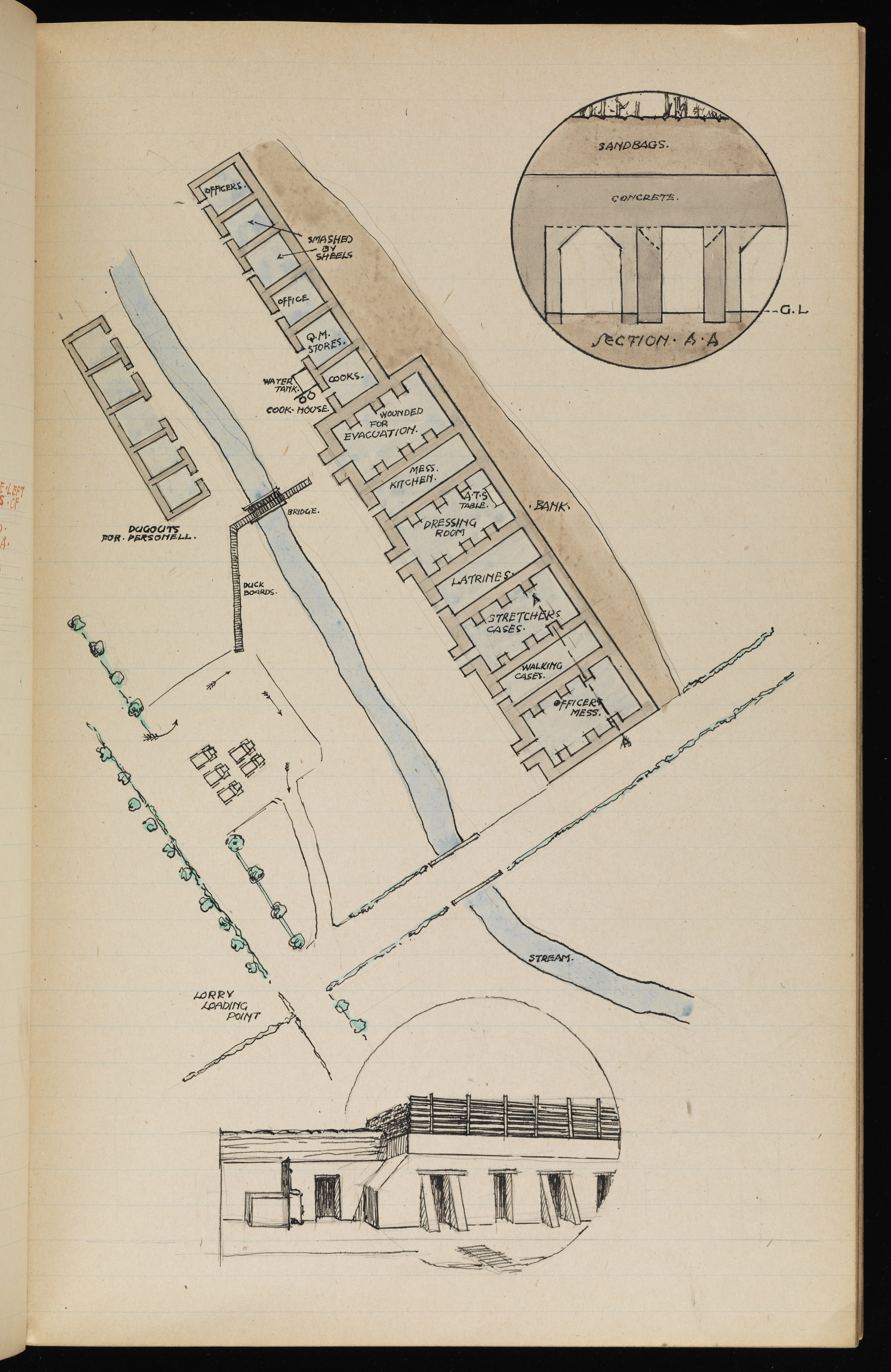
Drawing of Essex Farm Advanced Dressing Stations by Lance Corporals S.T. Smith and A.R. Watt, RAMC, of the 23rd Division Field Ambulance

Ordered to relieve the 34th Division the 23rd entered the Somme battle on 3 July, and subsequently advanced toward and captured Contalmaison by 10 July. The divisions second V.C. was won by 2nd Lt Donald Bell of the 9th Yorkshire Regiment on 5 July when he and two others (who both won the D.C.M.) rushed a machine gun nest. The division was relieved on 11 July, except for the 68th Brigade which joined the 34th Division on 11 July and took part in an abortive attack on Pozières on the night of 16/17 July, the artillery remained in action supporting the 1st Division. Indicative of the high morale of the division, the sick list for 14 July was one man. By 20 July the division once again had its three original brigades, the 70th Brigade returning from 8th Division where it had suffered heavy losses in the first day of the Somme battle and the 68th returning from the 34th Division.

On 25 July the division began to relieve the 1st Division east of Contalmaison, and began with each brigade in turn fighting along a trench called "Munster Alley" towards Martinpuich. The division's third V.C was won by Pte William Short of 8th West Yorkshire Regiment on 5 August. The division was relieved on 8 August by the 15th Division, and was sent to the relatively quiet sector of Ploegsteert Wood near Armentières.

Returning to the Somme in mid-September, the division was placed in reserve for the early part of the Battle of Flers-Courcelette, and over 18/19 September relieved the 15th Division and took over part of the 50th Division's line. Here they held the line and conducted raids, until advancing on 25 September at the request of the Canadians on the division's left to support their advance. The position, a trench called '26th Avenue' was occupied by 70th Brigade on 27 September after a German withdrawal, after an earlier attack failed when it was occupied, the subsequent advance and occupation of Destremont Farm on 29 September just outside the village of Le Sars was heavily contested. On 3 October in the initial advance on Le Sars, the division's fourth V.C. was won by 2nd Lt Henry Kelly. The village and positions around it, were captured by 68th and 69th brigades on 7/8 October, earning praise from III Corps, 50th and 15th division commanders. On 9 October the division was relieved by 15th Division, and was transferred to X Corps in the Ypres Salient.

Arriving at Ypres between 17 and 20 October, the division relieved the 2nd Australian Division around Sanctuary Wood and the Menin Ridge Road. While there they conducted patrols and trench raids and were in turn subjected to occasional artillery bombardments. On 10 December 1916 the division was required to execute one its commissioned officers, 2/Lt. Eric Poole, of the 11th (Service) Battalion, West Yorkshire Regiment, who had been sentenced to death by a court martial for desertion from his unit during the Somme Offensive. The division was relieved by the 38th Division in the Ypres sector on 25 February 1917.

=== 1917 ===
While out of the line the division was rested and trained, returning to the Ypres front line between 6 and 8 April and taking over positions held partly by the 38th and 47th divisions, south of where it had been previously. On 9 April the Germans launched an intense bombardment followed by an infantry assault which fell on the 70th Brigade. The division was quickly withdrawn from the line on 28 April, replaced by the 19th Division and given special training for the upcoming battle to improve the positions around Ypres.

==== Messines Ridge ====
The division returned to the front line on 10 May in the region of Hill 60 and began preparations for the attack. These preparation were observed by the Germans on the higher ground who assaulted the line on 13 May, which was repulsed, this attracted counter raiding by the 70th Brigade on 16 and 20 May. During this time the division's easily observed artillery attracted heavy German counter battery fire with serious casualties resulting. The division was to form the left flank of the advance on a front ~2000 yards wide, with its furthest advance ~1400 yards deep. After the artillery bombardment and the detonation of 19 mines on 7 June, the 69th and 70th brigades (the 69th reinforced with the 11th Northumberland Fusiliers and 12th Durham Light Infantry) advanced over the ridge and down each side of the valley on the southern flank of the Klein-Zillebeke spur, with fresh battalions leap-frogging the others when the second phase line had been reached. The new line was held until the 24th Division relieved them on 13 June.

The division returned to the line between 26 and 28 June in the area of Battle wood and Mt Sorrel and began preparations for the next phase of the planned assault. During a German raid on 7 July the division's fifth V.C. was won by 2nd Lt. Frederick Youens. The division was relieved in the line by 24th Division by 23 July.

==== Third Battle of Ypres ====
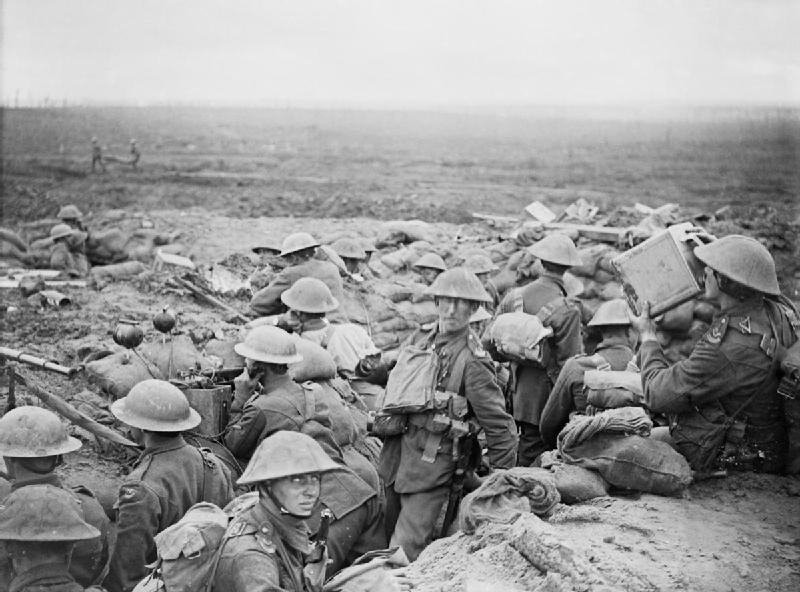
Infantry and signal section of 13th D.L.I. on the Menin Road

The battle to deny the Germans the heights east and north of Ypres began on 31 July, while the division was still in training. On 23 August the division was placed in reserve, with the 70th Brigade briefly reinforcing the 14th Division after a German attack until 30 August when the division was relieved. From 3 September the division began to make preparations for its attack due east, at first along either side of the Menin Road, and then north of it, on a front 1,000 yards wide with the objective up to 2000 yards away. The division moved into the line on 15 September. The attack began on 20 September with the 68th and 69th brigades advancing, one battalion of each brigade was to secure each of the three phase lines with the fourth as a reserve. The first line was captured within the hour, the advance to the second faced resistance from pill-boxes and dug-outs as did the advance to the third. The division held this line under German artillery fire until 25 September, relieved by the 33rd and 39th divisions. In this attack the division had lost 397 killed, 1,724 wounded and 179 missing, it had captured 596 prisoners.

Relief was short-lived, as on 27 September the division returned to the front to reinforce the 33rd Division, which had been counterattacked after its arrival. The 69th and 70th brigades fought off further attacks, while the division artillery suffered Mustard Gas attacks, the halting of one determined counterattack on 1 October earning the thanks of the Second Army Commander. The division left the front line on 3 October when relieved by the 5th Division, only to return on 8 October to relieve 7th Division in front of Polygon Wood. Required only to hold the line the division was subject to heavy shelling and lost 275 killed and 954 injured before relief on 14 October.

On 28 October the division was ordered to make ready to move by rail, and on 31 October the destination was confirmed as Italy.

==== Italy ====
The division arrived in Italy and concentrated around Mantua, South of Verona as part of XIV Corps on 11 November, 16 days after the Battle of Caporetto. From here on 19 November the division marched out to the front line, with the 69th and 70th brigades relieving the 70th Italian Division on the western part of the Montello and the adjoining plain South of the Piave River from 2–4 December. They immediately began to reorganise the defences to the standard defence in depth pattern used in Flanders and began patrols. Relief by the 41st Division, which like the 23rd had also been sent to Italy, began on 13 February 1918, by which time the division had suffered 38 dead and 136 wounded mostly due to artillery and air attack, comparatively small numbers compared to Flanders.

=== 1918–1919 ===
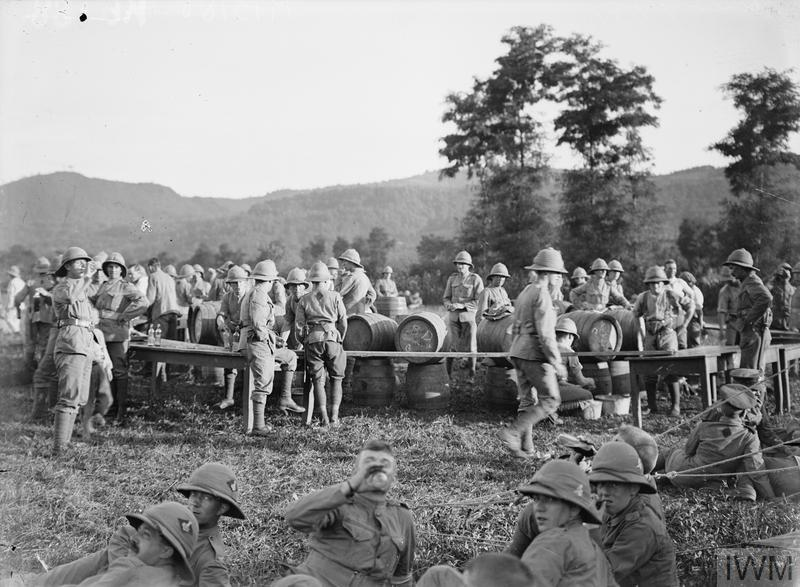
British troops at the canteen during a Divisional Horse Show, August 1918. The competition was probably organised by the 23rd Division. Soldiers in the background are of the Yorkshire Regiment (Green Howards, 69th Brigade), either 8th or 9th Battalion.

The relief was short-lived as the 5th and 41st divisions were withdrawn from Italy to meet the impending German spring offensive (the Germans had also withdrawn six of their divisions from Italy), the division returned to the Montello from 24 to 26 February, and by 8 March patrolling was impossible due to the height of the Piave river. The division was quickly relieved by the 51st Italian Division and by 16 March was out of the line.

==== The Asiago Plateau ====
It was quickly redeployed to the hills south of, and overlooking the Asiago plain, with its back to the edge of the Asiago plateau, some 3500 feet above the coastal plain, another different environment to Flanders, the 68th and 70th brigades taking over from the 11th Italian Division. Patrolling and raids were once again possible in spite of the cold and snow, and there was very little fire from the Austrian artillery. Relieved by the 48th Division on 23 April the division went into reserve around Trissino.

It was planned to return the division to the plateau on 19 May, for an offensive timed for mid June, on the march back men began to fall sick with influenza, which swept through the division over the next few weeks. Back on the plateau, early June saw raiding of the Austrian lines, when it was learned that the Austrians planned their own offensive for 14 June. After bombarding only the front lines, the Austrian advance was stopped on the 68th Brigade front after three hours by rifle and machine gun fire, here Lt. Jack Youll of 11th Northumberland Fusiliers won the V.C. securing the junction between the 23rd and 48th divisions. To their left the 70th Brigade's front line was partly overrun, it was restored by headquarters details and some Italian trench mortar-men led by Lt. Col. Charles Hudson of the 11th Sherwood Foresters for which he received the V.C. Further Austrian assaults were broken up by artillery.

In late July the division was relieved by the 48th Division after having further reinforced the front and reserve lines and conducted trench raids against the Austrians. On 19 August the division returned to the plateau for a planned attack, relieving the 48th Division, and began to conduct trench raids. One of these consisting of over 360 officers and men of 10th Duke of Wellington's Regiment failed to achieve surprise and was strongly opposed, despite this, 70 prisoners were taken for the loss of 2 dead, 48 injured and 6 missing. In September the reorganisation that had been applied to divisions in France in March was now applied in Italy, and each brigade lost one of its battalions. The 13th Durham Light Infantry, 9th Yorkshire Regiment and the 11th Sherwood Foresters left the division on 11 September, eventually to form the 74th Brigade of the reconstituted 25th Division.

News was received that the division was expected to return to France, and relief of the division from the plateau completed by 27 September by 20th Italian division, and training in open battle commenced around Costa Bissara then Trissino. Since arriving on the plateau the division had taken over 700 prisoners and deserters. (Note: Lieutenant-General Lord Cavan, commander of XIV Corps, as is required by tradition of peers passing through Oakham, Rutland for the first time, gave a horse shoe to be displayed in Oakham Castle. The horse shoe he gave has the inscription 'This shoe was taken off an Austrian pony captured in the trenches near Asiago, Italy, by a raiding party of the 23rd Division'.)

==== Vittorio Veneto ====
The planned move to France was cancelled and an attack on the Piave front was to be mounted in its place with the 7th and 23rd British divisions, for which the training remained appropriate. The division took its place in the line on the right bank of the Piave river on 21 October, where the river runs in braided channels over one mile wide around an island, Grave di Papadopoli, which the Austrians used as a post in front of their main line. On the night of 25–26 October the 8th Yorkshire Regiment captured the northern part of the Grave, troops from the 7th division the southern part. The 68th and 69th brigades crossed the river on 27 October, and the planned 3000 yard advance was achieved in spite of the division's left flank being unsupported by the 58th Italian division which could not cross the river. The Austrians were, however, demoralised and were retreating behind a rear-guard. The next day the divisions advance of 3,500 yards was done by mid afternoon, during which Pte. Wilfred Wood of the 10th Northumberland Fusiliers won the V.C. for subduing a machine gun nest. Early on 28 October the river Monticano was crossed by the 69th brigade, and in securing the bridgehead (amongst other actions) Sgt William McNally of the 8th Yorkshire Regiment won the division's ninth and last V.C.. Stiffening resistance meant the day's advance was much less than expected. By the afternoon of 31 October the 69th brigade was in the town of Sacile some 15 miles from the Piave, where the last shot was fired by the division. The advance continued through the remains of Austrian columns attacked by aircraft, until the armistice signed on 3 November came into effect the next day, by which time the division was east of the river Tagliamento.

The division remained in Northern Italy while its men were demobilised, with the division finally disbanded in early March 1919.

During the war the division had suffered 23,574 men killed, wounded and missing.

== General officers commanding ==
Rank	Name	Dates	Notes	Ref.
Major-General	J. M. Babington	18 September 1914 – 15 October 1918		
Brigadier-General	J. Byron	15 October – 20 October 1918	Acting	
Brigadier-General	H. Gordon	20 October – 21 October 1918	Acting	
Major-General	H. F. Thuillier	21 October 1918 – March 1919		

== Order of battle ==
The following units served in the division:

68th Brigade

- 10th (Service) Battalion, Northumberland Fusiliers
- 11th (Service) Battalion, Northumberland Fusiliers
- 12th (Service) Battalion, Durham Light Infantry
- 13th (Service) Battalion, Durham Light Infantry (left September 1918)
- 68th Machine Gun Company (formed March 1916, moved into 23rd Battalion Machine Gun Corps M.G.C. March 1918)
- 68th Trench Mortar Battery (formed June 1916)

69th Brigade

- 11th (Service) Battalion, Prince of Wales's Own (West Yorkshire Regiment)
- 8th (Service) Battalion, Alexandra, Princess of Wales's Own (Yorkshire Regiment)
- 9th (Service) Battalion, Alexandra, Princess of Wales's Own (Yorkshire Regiment) (left September 1918)
- 10th (Service) Battalion, Duke of Wellington's (West Riding Regiment)
- 69th Machine Gun Company (formed March 1916, moved into 23rd Battalion M.G.C. March 1918)
- 69th Trench Mortar Battery (formed June 1916)

70th Brigade

(Between October 1915 and July 1916 the brigade transferred to the 8th Division, swapping with the 24th Brigade.)

- 11th (Service) Battalion, Sherwood Foresters (left September 1918)
- 8th (Service) Battalion, King's Own Yorkshire Light Infantry
- 8th (Service) Battalion, York and Lancaster Regiment
- 9th (Service) Battalion, York and Lancaster Regiment
- 70th Machine Gun Company (formed July 1916, moved into 23rd Battalion M.G.C. March 1918)
- 70th Trench Mortar Battery (formed June 1916)

24th Brigade

(Between October 1915 and July 1916 the brigade joined from the 8th Division, exchanging with the 70th Brigade.)

- 1st Battalion, Worcestershire Regiment
- 2nd Battalion, East Lancashire Regiment
- 1st Battalion, Sherwood Foresters
- 2nd Battalion, Northamptonshire Regiment
- 24th Machine Gun Company (formed February 1916)
- 24th Trench Mortar Battery (formed June 1916)

Division Troops

- 8th (Service) Battalion, Leicestershire Regiment (left 8 April 1915)
- 9th (Service) Battalion, Leicestershire Regiment (left 8 April 1915)
- 9th (Service) Battalion, South Staffordshire Regiment (converted to divisional pioneer battalion in April 1915)
- 194th Machine Gun Company (joined 16 December 1916, moved into 23rd Battalion M.G.C. March 1918)
- 23rd Battalion M.G.C. (created 1 April 1918 absorbing brigade MG companies)
- 100th (Warwicks and South Notts Yeomanry) Machine Gun Battalion (joined 2 October 1918, left 19 October 1918)
- Division Mounted Troops
  - Regimental HQ, MG Section, C Squadron, Duke of Lancaster's Own Yeomanry (joined June 1915, left April 1916)
  - 23rd Divisional Cyclist Company, Army Cyclist Corps (formed in January 1915, left April 1916)
- 23rd Divisional Train Royal Army Service Corps
  - 190th – 193rd Companies,
- 35th Mobile Veterinary Section Army Veterinary Corps (joined 20 June 1915)
- 223rd Division Employment Company (formed June 1917)

Royal Artillery

- CII Brigade, Royal Field Artillery (R.F.A.)
- CIII Brigade, R.F.A.
- CIV Brigade, R.F.A. (left February 1917)
- CV (Howitzer) Brigade, R.F.A. (broken up 3 September 1916, redistributed to CII and CIII Brigades)
- 23rd Heavy Battery Royal Garrison Artillery (left 15 September 1915)
- 23rd Divisional Ammunition Column
- V/23 (Heavy) Trench Mortar Battery (formed from Division artillery March 1916, disbanded September 1917)
- X/23 Trench Mortar Battery (joined early 1916)
- Y/23 Trench Mortar Battery (joined early 1916)
- Z/23 Trench Mortar Battery (formed March 1916, broken up March 1918, redistributed to X/23 and Y/23 Batteries)

Royal Engineers

- 89th, 90th Field Companies (left January 1915)
- 101st, 102nd Field Companies (joined February 1915)
- 128th Field Company (joined April 1915)
- 23rd Divisional Signal Company

Royal Army Medical Corps

- 69th, 70th, 71st Field Ambulance
- 40th Sanitary Section, R.A.M.C. (joined August 1915, left April 1917)

== Battles ==
See

- Battle of the Somme
  - Battle of Albert
  - Battle of Pozières
  - Battle of Flers-Courcelette
  - Battle of Morval
  - Battle of Le Transloy
- Battle of Messines
- Third Battle of Ypres
  - Battle of the Menin Road Ridge
  - Battle of Polygon Wood
  - First Battle of Passchendaele
- Battle of the Asiago Plateau
- Battle of Vittorio Veneto

== Awards ==
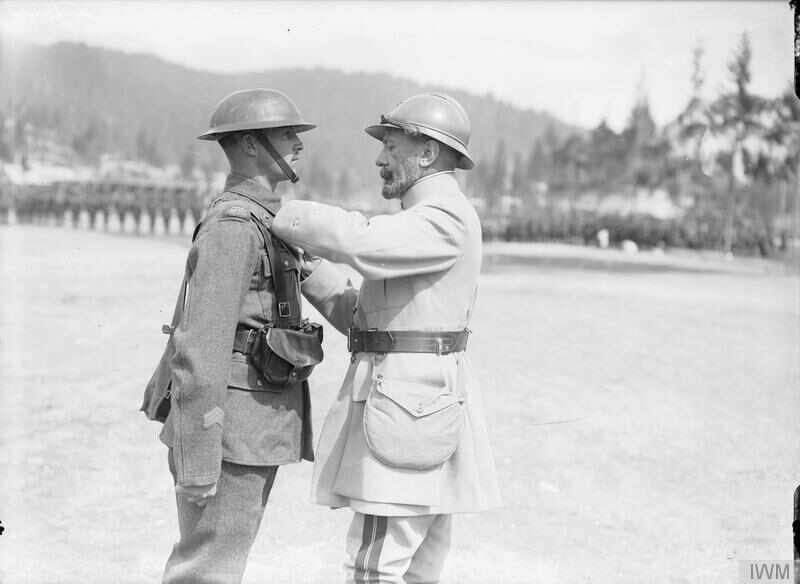
General Jean Graziani, the C-in-C of the French Army in Italy, decorating a soldier of the 11th Battalion, Sherwood Foresters (Nottinghamshire and Derbyshire Regiment), with the Croix de Geurre. Photograph taken during the presentation ceremony of decorations to soldiers of both armies after the Battle of the Piave River. Granezza, 12 July 1918

Between 1915 and 1918 the officers and men of the division won the following:

British awards
Victoria Cross	9
Knight Commander of the Order of the Bath	1
Companion of the Order of the Bath	3
Knight Commander of the Order of St Michael and St George	1
Companion of the Order of St Michael and St George	18
Distinguished Service Order	105 (including 16 bars)
Officer of the Order of the British Empire (military)	19
Member of the Order of the British Empire	31
Military Cross	464 (including 38 bars and 2 second bars)
Distinguished Conduct Medal	279 (including 9 bars and 1 second bar)
Military Medal	1907 (including 106 bars and 3 second bars)
Meritorious Service Medal	154
French awards
Legiond'Honneur - Commandeur	1
Legiond'Honneur - Officer	1
Legiond'Honneur - Chevalier	1
Médaille militaire	4
Croix de Guerre	16
Italian awards
Order of Savoy - Officer	1
Order of the Crown of Italy	3
Order of Saints Maurice and Lazarus	4
Silver Medal of Military Valor	31
Bronze Medal of Military Valor	47
Croce di Guerra	120
Belgian awards
Officier de l'Ordre de la Couronne	1
Decoration Militaire	1
Croix de Guerre	40
Russian awards
Order of St. Anna, 3rd Class	1
Cross of St. George, 4th Class	1
Medal of St. George, 4th Class	1
Montenegrin awards
Silver Medal for Valour	3

== Battle insignia ==
The practice of wearing battalion specific insignia (often called battle patches) in the B.E.F. began in mid 1915 with the arrival of units of Kitchener's Armies and was widespread after the Somme Battles of 1916. The patches shown were worn by the division during 1917. There was no overall division scheme for the battle patches, they were adopted gradually from mid 1916.

68th Brigade battle patches	From left to right, top row: 10th, 11th Northumberland Fusiliers, 12th, 13th Durham Light Infantry. The D.L.I. patches use regimental colours. Bottom row: 68th Machine gun Company. The 10th N.F, 13th D.L.I and 68th MG company patches were worn on both sleeves. In Italy the 13th D.L.I. used its patch as a pargi (puggaree) flash on pith helmets.
69th Brigade WW1 patches	From left to right, top row: 11th West Yorkshire Regiment, 8th, 9th Yorkshire Regiment (Green Howards), 10th Duke of Wellington's. Bottom row: 69th Machine gun Company. Except the MG company which wore its patches on both sleeves, all were worn on the back. In Italy the 11th West Yorks and the 8th Green Howards used the patch as a pargi flash on pith helmets, and the 10th Duke of Wellingtons stencilled a silhouette of the regimental badge on their helmets.
70th Brigade WW1 patches	From left to right, top row: 11th Sherwood Foresters, 8th King's Own Yorkshire Light Infantry, 8th, 9th York and Lancaster Regiment. This brigades patches were based on regimental badges or battalion numbers. Bottom row: 70th Machine gun Company. Except for the MG company, which wore its patches on both sleeves, all patches were worn on the back, in addition the 8th York and Lancasters stencilled theirs on the helmet.

== Related formation ==
The 23rd (Northumbrian) Division was a 2nd Line Territorial Army duplicate of the 1st Line 50th (Northumbrian) Infantry Division that was formed shortly after the outbreak of the Second World War and was disbanded in July 1940 after suffering heavy losses in France before the Battle of Dunkirk.

== See also ==
- List of British divisions in World War I
