= John Doran (Indian Army officer) =

General Sir John Doran KCB
- Born: 2 October 1824; Ireland
- Died: 25 September 1903 (aged 78); Surrey, England
- Relatives: Major-General Beauchamp Doran (son); Brigadier-General Walter Doran (son)
- Military career
- Branch: East India Company; British Indian Army
- Rank: General
- Unit: 24th Regiment of Bengal Native Infantry
- Awards: Knight Commander of the Order of the Bath

General Sir John Doran, KCB (2 October 1824 – 25 September 1903) was a British Indian Army officer from an established Irish family with links to Irish nobility. He saw extensive service in India and the North West Frontier. He had originally taken a commission in one of the East India Company Regiments (the 24th Regiment of Bengal Native Infantry) in 1842.

In 1893, whilst serving as a lieutenant general in India, Doran was knighted as a Knight Commander of the Order of the Bath. He was promoted full general on 1 April 1894.

== Family ==
Doran's younger brother Robert Doran, also a British Army officer, was killed in the Second Anglo-Burmese War in 1852.

Doran married Georgina Sultana Magrath in London on 13 November 1856. The Dorans had four sons and four daughters; three of the sons had military careers and served as officers in the First World War. Two retired in general officer rank. One daughter married a senior British Army officer, and another daughter served as a sister in the Army Nursing Service, and died after contracting gastritis whilst nursing at Carnarvon, Cape Colony, during the Second Boer War.

This military family had strong links with the County Wexford in Ireland. His father was Major John Doran of Ely House, Wexford. General Doran died in Surrey, England. His wife survived him by a further nine years; she died in Wexford, Ireland in 1912.
