= Huck (magazine) =

Lifestyle magazine known for DIY Culture, surfing and skating, and art

- Categories: DIY culture, art magazine, lifestyle
- Frequency: Bi-monthly
- Publisher: TCOLondon
- First issue: 2006
- Based in: London
- Website: www.huckmag.com

Huck is a bi-monthly magazine, website and video platform. It has been recognised for its style of exploring subcultures as "entry points for articles about music, politics and places all over the world". It is published by the London-based media company TCOLondon, which also publishes Little White Lies magazine.

== History and rationale ==
Huck was launched in 2006 and was initially inspired by the rebellious heritage of surf and skate. The magazine's coverage has since broadened to cover the wider world of culture. In 2006, the founding editor and TCOLondon publisher, Vince Medeiros, initially said of Huck's intended readership, "Our readers will be part of the tribe of surf, skate and snowboard culture, but they will be people who appreciate that there are other things in life." The editor-in-chief, Andrea Kurland, explained the magazine's ethos in 2014 as "punk, skateboarding, surfing, activism, hip-hop, outsider art, indie publishing".

The first issue, which had the snowboarder Shaun White on the cover, was delayed by two months after burglars cleared out the magazine's Shoreditch office two weeks before the original release date in May 2006.

Huck cover stars have occasionally co-curated the issue in which they appear, suggesting stories on people, places and moments that have inspired them. Dave Eggers, Miranda July, Mark Gonzales, Kim Gordon and Cat Power are among those who have guest-edited. In 2015, the print magazine shifted from using cover stars to themed issues.

Huck is available in the UK, France, Belgium, Germany, Poland, Croatia, Malta, Norway, Sweden, Austria, Switzerland, Ireland, USA, Canada, Australia, Taiwan, Hong Kong, New Zealand and Brazil.

San Francisco–based Chronicle Books published the first Huck book, Paddle Against the Flow: Lessons on Life from Doers, Creators, and Culture-Shakers in 2015. The book collects insights from more than 60 people with whom Huck has published interviews, as well as photography and art.

Huck was included in Graphic Design – Now In Production, an exhibition co-organized by the Smithsonian Institution’s Cooper Hewitt, Smithsonian Design Museum in New York and the Walker Art Center in Minneapolis, that toured the United States from 2011 to 2014.

== Awards ==
- Society of Publication Designers (2014): Merit winner in editorial design
- Art Directors Club (2013): Merit winner in illustration
- Amnesty International Media Awards (2012): Special Commendation
- D&AD Awards (2010): Yellow Pencil nomination Illustration/Magazine & Newspaper design
- The Maggies (2009): Best cover award, Sports and Men’s category
- Magazine Design and Journalism Awards (2008): Nominated Best Designed Magazine
