= John James Doran =

Boatswain's Mate

- Born: July 6, 1864; Boston, Massachusetts, US
- Died: February 16, 1904 (aged 39); Fall River, Massachusetts, US
- Burial place: Saint Patrick's Cemetery, Fall River, Massachusetts
- Military career
- Allegiance: United States of America
- Branch: United States Navy
- Service years: 1884–1904
- Rank: Chief Master-at-Arms
- Units: USS Marblehead (C-11); USS Montgomery (C-9)
- Conflicts: Spanish–American War; *Battle of Guantanamo Bay; *Battle of Cienfuegos; *Battle of Fort Cayo del Toro
- Awards: Medal of Honor

John James Doran (July 6, 1864 – February 16, 1904) was a Boatswain's Mate, 2nd Class in the United States Navy during the Spanish–American War.

== Biography ==
Born in Boston, Massachusetts, enlisted in the Navy February 8, 1884 and served continuously until his death while serving as chief master-at-arms in USS Montgomery (C-9). He received the Medal of Honor for extraordinary bravery and coolness under heavy fire from the enemy while cutting the cables leading from Cienfuegos, Cuba, May 11, 1898.

== Namesake ==
Two ships, USS Doran, were named for him. An elementary school in Fall River, Massachusetts is also named for him, as was a former second annex school to the first.

== Medal of Honor citation ==
On board the USS Marblehead during the operation of cutting the cable leading from Cienfuegos, Cuba, 11 May 1898. Facing the heavy fire of the enemy, Doran set an example of extraordinary bravery and coolness throughout this action.

== See also ==
- List of Medal of Honor recipients for the Spanish–American War
- The Hiker (Fall River, Massachusetts)
