= 110th Brigade (United Kingdom) =

Military unit in the UK

- Active: 10 December 1914–27 April 1915; 27 April 1915–19 May 1919
- Allegiance: United Kingdom
- Branch: New Army
- Type: Infantry
- Size: Brigade
- Part of: 37th Division; 21st Division
- Nickname: The Tigers
- Engagements: Battle of Bazentin Ridge; Capture of Gueudecourt; Battle of Arras; Third Battle of Ypres; German spring offensive Hundred Days Offensive

Commanders
- Notable commanders: Brig-Gen Guy Bainbridge; Brig-Gen Lord Loch; Brig-Gen Douglas Cayley; Brig-Gen Hanway Cumming

The 110th Brigade (110th Bde) was an infantry formation of the British Army during World War I. It was raised as part of 'Kitchener's Army' and was assigned to the 37th Division. After the original formations were renumbered, the numbers were transferred to a new brigade and division formed from unallocated 'Army Troops'. The new 110th Brigade was formed from the Kitchener battalions of the Leicestershire Regiment, known as 'The Tigers' from its regimental badge: consequently the brigade was also known by this nickname. The brigade went to the Western Front with 37th Division, but shortly after the start of the Battle of the Somme it was transferred to the 21st Division and fought with that formation for the rest of the war, distinguishing itself in its first offensive action, the Battle of Bazentin Ridge and later at the Capture of Gueudecourt. It also fought at Arras, Ypres, against the German spring offensives when it was virtually destroyed, and in the final victorious Hundred Days Offensive.

== Original 110th Brigade ==
Alfred Leete's recruitment poster for Kitchener's Army.

On 6 August 1914, less than 48 hours after Britain's declaration of war, Parliament sanctioned an increase of 500,000 men for the Regular British Army. The newly-appointed Secretary of State for War, Earl Kitchener of Khartoum, issued his famous call to arms: 'Your King and Country Need You', urging the first 100,000 volunteers to come forward. This group of six divisions with supporting arms became known as Kitchener's First New Army, or 'K1'. The K2, K3 and K4 battalions, brigades and divisions followed soon afterwards. But the flood of volunteers overwhelmed the ability of the Army to absorb them, and the K5 units were largely raised by local initiative rather than at regimental depots, often from men from particular localities or backgrounds who wished to serve together: these were known as 'Pals battalions'. The 'Pals' phenomenon quickly spread across the country, as local recruiting committees offered complete units to the War Office (WO). The 37th Division was authorised on 10 December 1914, having been raised largely by Edward Stanley, 17th Earl of Derby from the cities of Liverpool and Manchester. Its 110th Brigade consisted of four battalions of 'Liverpool Pals' (17th–21st Battalions, King's (Liverpool Regiment)), which had been recruited by the Earl of Derby after a meeting at the Old Watch Factory in Prescot on 29 August 1914, the first 'local' battalions to be formed and thus the senior units of K5.

On 27 April 1915 it was renumbered 89th Brigade in 30th Division, the original 89th Bde of 30th Division (K4 battalions) having been converted into 1st Reserve Brigade and the original 30th Division disbanded. At the same time the 44th Division, formed in March 1915 for the Sixth New Army (K6), took up the vacant position as 37th Division, and its 131st Brigade was renumbered 110th Brigade.

== New 110th Brigade ==
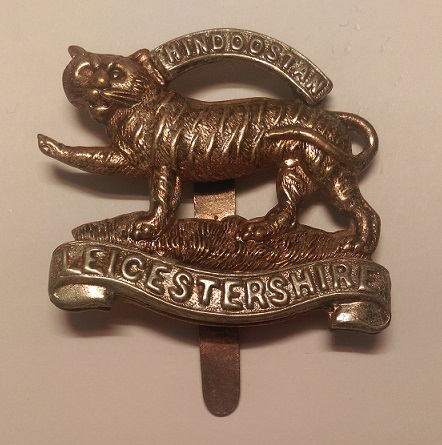
Cap badge of the Leicestershire Regiment.

As authorised in March 1915, 44th (later 37th) Division consisted of 'spare' Kitchener battalions that had originally been assigned as 'Army Troops' for the New Armies (ie they were not assigned to a specific formation). Its 131st (later 110th) Brigade was composed of battalions of the Leicestershire Regiment:

- 6th (Service) Battalion, Leicestershire Regiment – raised on 24 August 1914 (K1), attached to 9th (Scottish) Division at Aldershot
- 7th (Service) Battalion, Leicestershire Regiment – raised on 21 September 1914 (K2), attached to 15th (Scottish) Division at Aldershot
- 8th (Service) Battalion, Leicestershire Regiment – raised on 25 September 1914 (K3), attached to 23rd Division at Aldershot
- 9th (Service) Battalion, Leicestershire Regiment – raised on 28 September 1914 (K3), attached to 23rd Division at Aldershot

The Leicestershire Regiment was known as 'The Tigers' from its Royal Tiger badge, and the nickname was also applied to 110th Bde. The brigade was commanded by Brigadier-General Guy Bainbridge, appointed on 8 April 1915. By the time the division was formed all its units had been training for some months, and it was quickly assembled on Salisbury Plain for final battle training. In July it was ordered to France to join the British Expeditionary Force (BEF). 110th Brigade arrived by train at Folkestone on the night of 29 July and landed at dawn next day at Boulogne. On 2 August the division completed its concentration around Tilques, near Saint-Omer.

== Service ==
On arrival the units of 37th Division were attached to those of 12th (Eastern) Division for instruction in trench warfare in the quiet sector near Armentières. At the end of August 37th Division entrained for Doullens and then marched to the sector south of Arras, where the BEF was taking over more of the line from French troops. 110th Brigade took over a line of trenches running east of the villages of Berles-au-Bois and Bienvillers-au-Bois in front of Monchy-au-Bois held by the Germans. The battalions took turns in the front line, but there was little shelling or Trench raiding and only a trickle of casualties. From 23 to 27 September during the Battle of Loos the division was stationed at La Cauchie to act as reserve for the French Tenth Army's attack, but then returned to Arras and the routine of trench holding through the autumn and winter. In the spring of 1916 the division was relieved from the line for a few weeks, then returned, 110th Bde taking up a new sector at Hannescamps.

At this time 110th Bde was joined by its auxiliary units:

- 110th Brigade Machine Gun (MG) Company, Machine Gun Corps – formed at Grantham disembarked at Le Havre 2 March and joined 4 March
- 110th Trench Mortar Battery (TMB) – formed as 110/1 TMB on 23 March and 110/2 TMB by 13 May, and combined into single battery on 13 June; personnel seconded from the infantry battalions; equipped with 3-inch Stokes mortars

Brigadier-Gen Bainbridge was promoted to command 25th Division on 1 June and was succeeded on 9 June by Brig-Gen William Hessey, Lieutenant-Colonel Edward Challenor of 6th Leicesters officiating until he arrived.

=== Somme ===
By June 1916 37th Division had been in France almost a year and had still not participated in any major action, but the BEF was now preparing for that summer's 'Big Push' (the Battle of the Somme). The artillery bombardment began on 23 June and the assault was launched on 1 July. Initially, 37th Division was not involved, being stationed by Third Army at Humbercamps behind 46th (North Midland) and 56th (1/1st London) Divisions, ready to exploit in case they broke through in their Attack on the Gommecourt Salient. The attack was a disaster and there was no possibility of a breakthrough. Instead, 37th Division's brigades were temporarily transferred to other divisions to replace brigades that had been shattered on the First day on the Somme. 110th Brigade went to 21st Division in Fourth Army on 7 July in exchange for 63rd Bde. What began as a temporary expedient became permanent, and 110th Bde fought under 21st Division for the remainder of the war, alongside 62nd and 64th Bdes.

21st Division's 'Three Sevens' formation sign.

The brigade marched to the southern end of the Somme battlefield, where Fricourt had been captured on 1 July, and established Brigade HQ (BHQ) in a huge German dugout beneath the site of the chateau. The battalions took over some captured trenches north-east of Fricourt Wood, between Contalmaison and Mametz. The brigade was ordered to move on the night of 13/14 July to a position in front of Mametz Wood to attack Bazentin Wood. Unlike the opening attack of the offensive, the assault on the German Second Position (Braune Stellung) was to be launched at dawn after only five minutes of bombardment to achieve surprise, though this entailed a difficult assembly at night. 21st Division used the fresh 110th Bde for its attack, reinforced by the 1st East Yorkshire Regiment. 6th and 7th Leicesters were to lead, each with a Stokes mortar and one company of 8th Leicesters attached to it. The rest of 8th Leicesters was in support, and 9th Leicesters and 1st East Yorks were in reserve; 110th MG Company was to cover the left flank of the advance. 6th Leicesters moved into position via the eastern edge of Mametz Wood, while 7th and 8th went up by the light railway, where Lt-Col W. Drysdale of the 7th was wounded. The jumping-off tapes had been laid by 98th Field Company, Royal Engineers (RE), 100 yards (91 m) outside the northern edge of Mametz Wood and about 400 yards (370 m) from the enemy positions. Despite some shellfire aimed at Mametz Wood, the leading battalions were deployed in four lines on these tapes by 02.35. The rear wave of 6th Leicesters, and the rear three waves of 7th Leicesters were hidden in the wood. No enemy flares had been fired and the outposts out in front had not sighted a single hostile patrol: the surprise was complete.

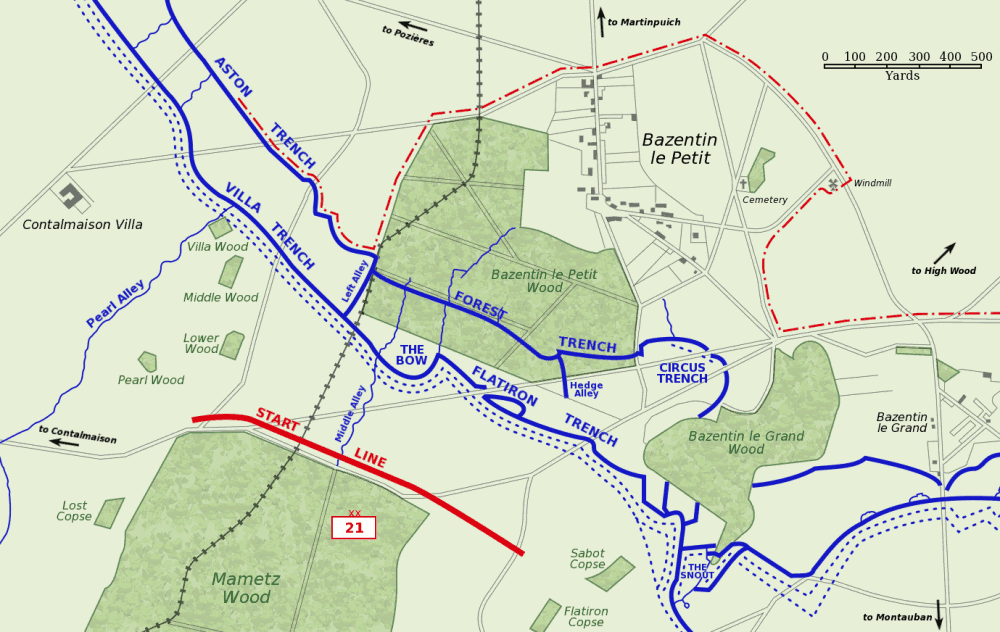
21st Division's attack at the Battle of Bazentin Ridge, 14 July 1916 (start line in red; German trenches in blue, objective in dotted red).

The Battle of Bazentin Ridge was launched at 03.20 on 14 July with a sudden intense artillery bombardment of the enemy positions, while the machine guns fired on fixed lines. At 03.25 the barrage lifted forward (one of the first examples of a Creeping barrage) and the infantry advanced through the ground mist at a steady pace. 6th and 7th Leicesters were through the barbed wire and into the German front line trench before the defenders had time to react. The following waves mopped up the defenders appearing from their dugouts. When the enemy counter-barrage came, it fell behind the rapidly advancing infantry. Only the centre of 7th Leicesters was held up for about 20 minutes by some machine guns, but the companies either side worked inwards and silenced them. Lieutenant-Col J.G. Mignon of 8th Leicesters was killed while leading up his bombers in support. The brigade took the second line ('Forest Trench') without much resistance by 04.00, and pushed on to Bazentin-le-Petit Wood. This too was captured with little fighting, except the north-western corner, where two company commanders of the Leicesters were wounded while trying to organise its capture and the Germans held out all day. Parties of 9th Leicesters carried up supplies of bombs for this fighting in the wood. On the right, the road through Bazentin-le-Petit village was the boundary with 7th Division. 6th Leicesters secured the northern part of the village before 2nd Royal Irish Regiment of that division arrived at the southern end, and together they had cleared it by 07.30, the Leicesters then handing over to the Royal Irish. A German counter-attack briefly retook the northern part during which 6th Leicesters withdrew to the wood, but during the morning the REs helped the brigade to consolidate its position between the wood and the village. In a few hours Fourth Army had seized the whole Ginchy–Pozières Ridge, but despite this resounding success, poor staff work meant that 7th and 3rd Divisions did not advance to take High Wood, and the cavalry arrived too late to exploit the breakthrough. 110th Brigade had achieved everything asked of it, but the casualties were heavy, particularly among 7th Leicesters: the brigade lost about 2000 men out of 3500 effectives. Next day 110th Bde received a premature order to withdraw, leaving only a single company of 1st East Yorks in position. Realising the error, the brigade staff rushed to recall the men before the enemy noticed. During the morning 21st Division repulsed a small counter-attack, and on 17/18 July 110th Bde handed over its positions in Bazentin-le-Petit and withdrew into reserve.

21st Division returned to the Arras sector, with 110th Bde taking over the 'I' sector of the line in the eastern suburbs of the city, establishing BHQ in a large brewery in the Place Ste Croix. It was quiet sector, with little shelling, and the old French trenches from 1915 were much overgrown, but 8th Leicesters did carry out one raid to bring back a prisoner for identification of the force opposite. However, the supporting bombardment warned the Germans, who abandoned their front line for its duration and no prisoner was obtained.

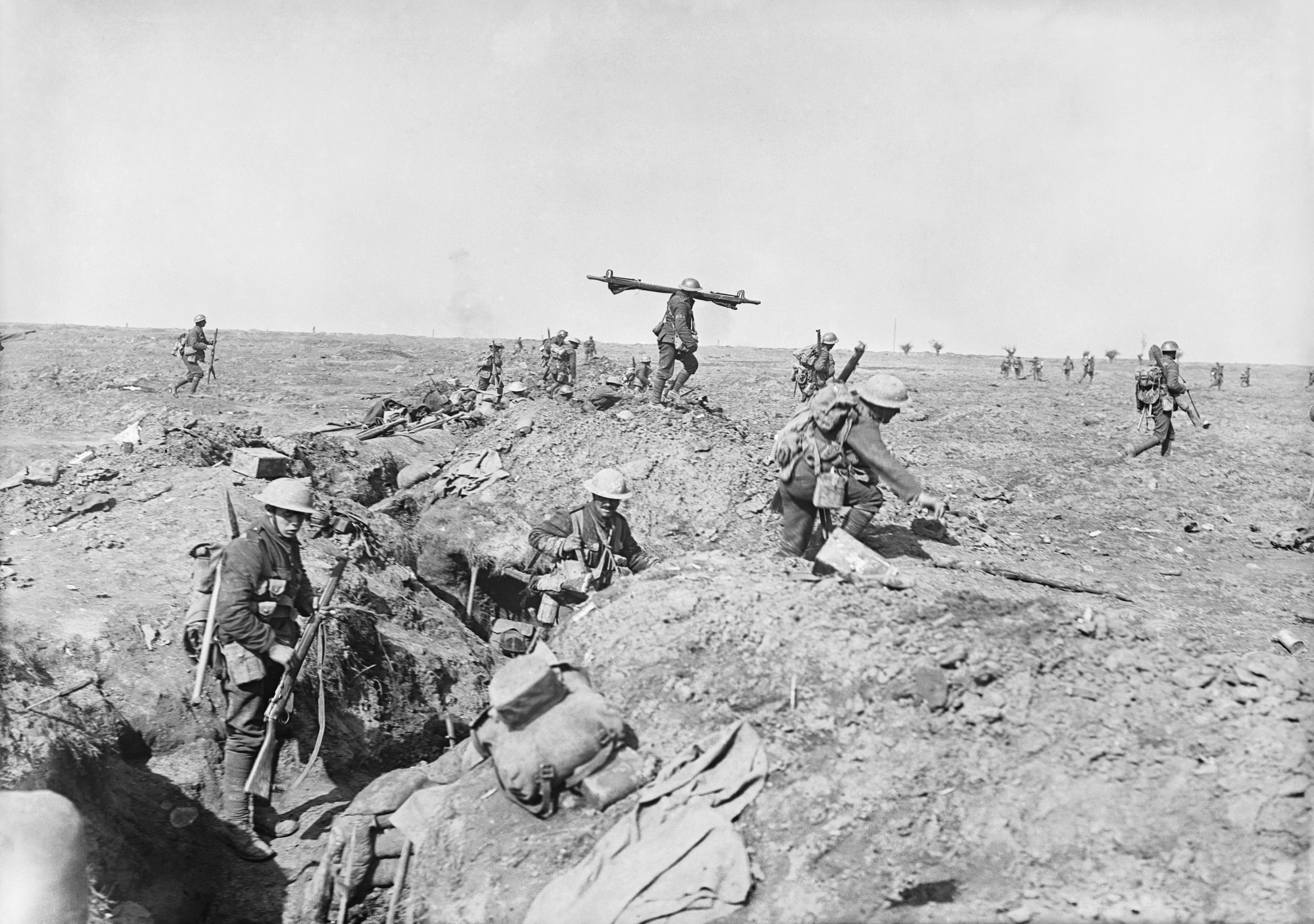
British infantry advancing at the Battle of Morval, 25 September 1916.

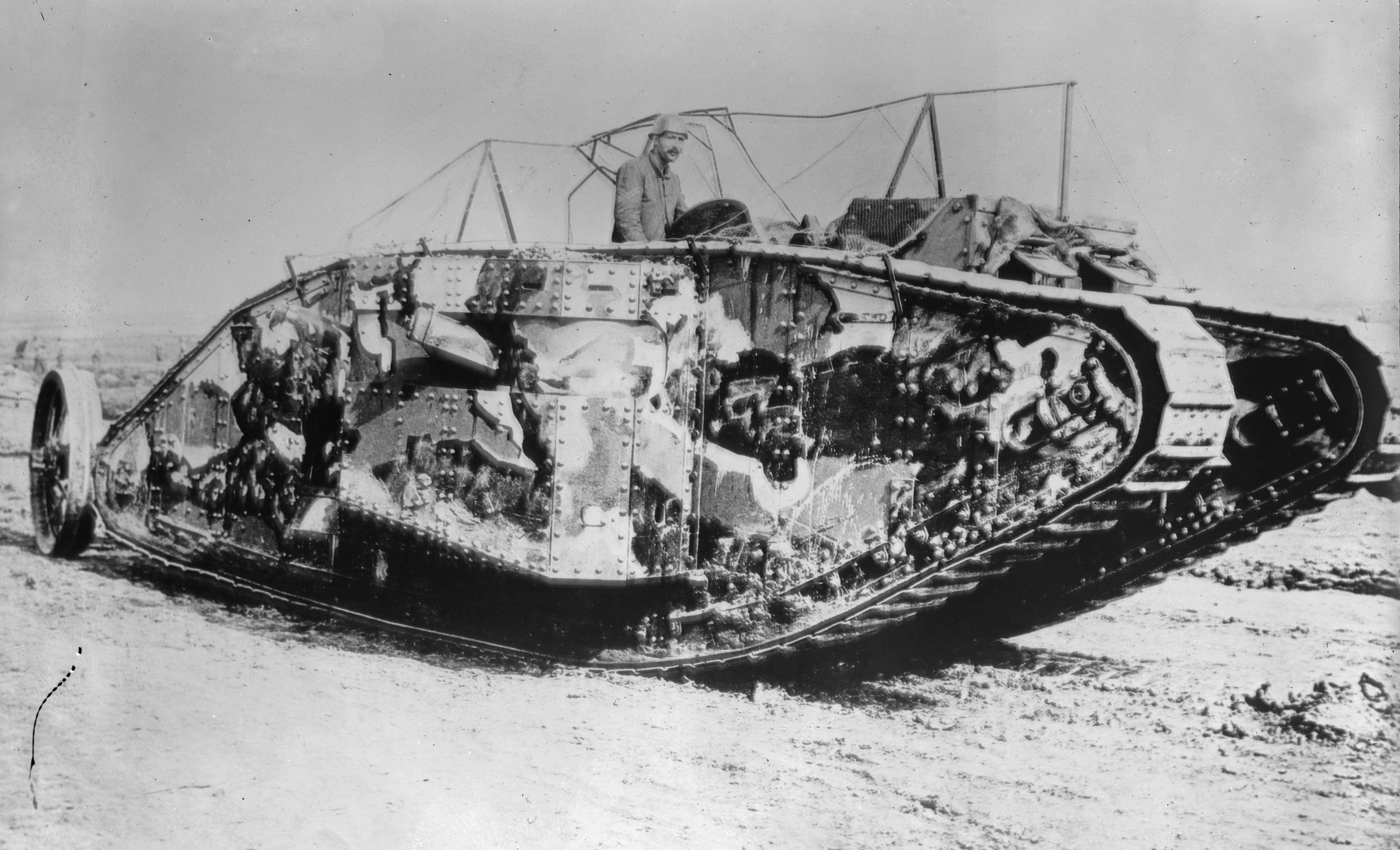
A female Mark I tank.

21st Division left Arras in late August, and after two weeks' training returned to the Somme on 13 September, moving into reserve trenches at Montauban on the night of 19/20 September. On the night of 24/25 September 110th Bde moved up to a ridge overlooking Gueudecourt, objective of the next day's attack (part of the Battle of Morval). 110th and 64th Bdes shared an HQ established in and behind one of the new tanks (D17) that had been abandoned during the Battle of Flers–Courcelette on 15 September. 110th Brigade reached its shallow jumping-off trenches by 02.30, but the men had to lay out in them until the barrage opened up at the unusual hour of 12.35. 8th and 9th Leicesters left their assembly trenches just below the crest of the ridge, advancing steadily behind the bursting shells of the creeping barrage. The first objective was the 'Gird' trenches in front, then the troops were to advance to the far side of the village in two stages. 8th and 9th Leicesters led off, running into a German barrage early in their advance, but the two leading companies of each battalion took 'Goat Trench', halfway to Gird Trench, without serious opposition (the Germans having withdrawn their machine guns to safer positions under the bombardment). Following the barrage when it lifted off Goat Trench, the attackers found the wire well cut, but heavy enfilade fire from Point 91 in Gird Trench off to the right caused many casualties and prevented them from reaching Gird Trench in any numbers. Lieutenant-Col C.H. Haig of 9th Leicesters came up 'Pilgrim's Way', a track leading from Flers to Gueudecourt, and despite being wounded reorganised the leading troops. Unfortunately the runner he sent back to hurry up the reserve companies (A and B) from the assembly trenches was wounded, and no help arrived. Eventually 9th Leicesters formed a defensive flank along 'Watling Street', a sunken portion of the Ginchy–Gueudecourt road on the right, while a party of 8th Leicesters maintained a bombing block in part of Gird Trench on the left. Some men of the battalion were believed to have pushed on into Gueudecourt, but if they did they were never heard of again. Next morning 110th Bde renewed the attack on Gird Trench. A British aircraft directed an accurate bombardment of the trench and then at 06.30 one of the new tanks (D4: a machine-gun armed 'female' Mark I tank commanded by 2/Lt Charles Storey) came up Pilgrim's Way to 8th Leicesters' bombing block and then turned left, moving along Gird Trench, firing as it did. The tank was closely followed by a bombing party from 7th Leicesters with two companies in support. The spotter aircraft also raked the trench with machine gun fire.The Germans were gradually driven along the trench, those who took shelter in dugouts being bombed, and those who fled cross-country being shot down by Lewis gun fire. Some 1,500 yards (1,400 m) of trench up to Point 91 were cleared and German casualties were very heavy, 8 officers and 362 ORs surrendering, including a battalion HQ; 110th Bde's losses were just 5 men. 110th Brigade continued to push cautiously forward to complete the Capture of Gueudecourt. (Tank D4 may have driven into Gueudecourt and engaged the enemy before turning back.) About 14.15 a squadron of the 19th Lancers of the Indian Army rode up and entered Gueudecourt on foot, and 6th Leicesters followed its own patrols into the village about 16.30. Half an hour later a counter-attack on Gueudecourt by three German battalions was caught by some 60 field guns of the British artillery and the attackers fled towards Le Transloy, throwing away their weapons. No further enemy movement was seen, the cavalry withdrew about 18.00 and the Leicesters dug in on the far edge of the village, staying outside the village itself because it attracted enemy shellfire. During 27 September 7th Leicesters relieved 6th Leicesters, but Lt-Col Drysdale, who had only just returned to command 7th Leicesters, was killed by a sniper. 21st Division was relieved on the night of 29/30 September, Lt-Col Unwin, who had succeeded to the command of 8th Leicesters, being wounded by a shell as 110th Bde marched out.

=== Winter 1916–17 ===
110th Brigade went north by train and in early October it took over the section of line north of Loos facing the Hohenzollern Redoubt, scene of major fighting in 1915 and early 1916. Since then mining by both sides had transformed the front line into a series of interlocking craters making major attacks impossible. The Germans dominated the sector with trench mortars directed from observation posts on a coal tip known as 'Fosse 8'. Brigade HQ was in shelters off 'Hulluch Alley', one of the main communication trenches, but as the winter progressed the RE Tunnelling Companies provided an elaborate system of tunnels and the exposed trenches were hardly used. During the winter many of the trenches fell in and filled with mud. Early in 1917 the brigade carried out a raid on an isolated German outpost known as 'Diamond Point'. The tunnellers opened shafts in No man's land as close as possible to the enemy position and the artillery and trench mortars opened feint bombardments at other parts of the line, with a smoke barrage on Fosse 8 to blind observation. The raiders emerged from. their shafts and used Bangalore torpedoes to cut the wire before rushing the outposts and coming back with eight prisoners. The German retaliatory fire fell opposite the feint bombardments and not on the raiding party.

In February the Germans began their planned retreat to the Hindenburg Line (Operation Alberich) and 21st Division was sent south to take part in the pursuit. 110th Brigade followed up along cratered roads through destroyed villages. On 2 April 62nd Bde took part in 'pinching out' the village of Croisilles, an outpost of the Hindenburg Line, after which 110th Bde took over the line, with two companies of 7th Leicesters holding the village itself. On 9 April, the first day of the Arras Offensive, 64th Bde seized and held the front trench of the Hindenburg Line opposite Croisilles, and 62nd Bde expanded the holding. By mid-April 110th Bde was holding this as the British front line.

=== Arras ===
The Arras Offensive was renewed with the Third Battle of the Scarpe on 3 May. 21st Division had been out of the line for 10 days and 110th Bde was still fresh. It was given the principal task for the division, to advance along the Hindenburg Line to the River Sensée and then capture Fontaine beyond it. The brigade moved into the line on 2 May, but the ammunition dumps it formed in the assembly trenches were accurately shelled by the enemy. The assembly trenches were too crowded and were known to be covered by the German defensive barrage. Despite his misgivings Brig-Gen Hessey was not permitted to advance his start line out of this danger because the neighbouring 18th (Eastern) Division could not align with it. When the attack began, the German barrage was weaker than expected thank to previous British Counter-battery fire, but the infantry assault was hurried, and with 18th (E) Division shying to the right away from the shellfire, 8th and 9th Leicesters were also shouldered off to the right. The attack lost cohesion and disintegrated, mostly held up in front of the trench covering Fontaine and Chérisy. On the right about 100 men of 9th Leicesters were reported to have crossed this line and reached the Croisilles–Chérisy road. Hessey ordered 6th Leicesters to attack Fontaine Wood to protect these advanced troops from counter-attack, but the counter-attack came in too quickly, cutting off all the troops who had reached the road. The two tanks assigned to the brigade had been late arriving and were soon put out of action. At 19.15, to cooperate with 18th (E) Division, two companies of 7th Leicesters was ordered to bomb their way down a trench that proved to be no more than a trace on the ground and afforded no cover, the battalion suffering heavy casualties in consequence. At 22.00 Hessey learned that 18th (E) Division had fallen back, along with many of his men, and he had to order the scattered survivors to reorganise behind the original position. When it was relieved on 5 May 110th Brigade had suffered almost 1000 casualties, of whom 388 men were missing, many of them having been cut off and taken prisoner.

110th Brigade returned to holding the former Hindenburg Line trenches facing Fontaine, with BHQ in shelters dug into the side of the Saint-Léger–Hénin road and company HQs in former German pillboxes. The troops were occupied with constructing and wiring fresh positions. On 20 June Brig-Gen Hessey was sent back to the UK, sick, and was later replaced by Brig-Gen Lord Loch, who as Brigadier-General, General Staff, of VI Corps had planned the successful attack that launched the Arras Offensive. The brigade spent the summer months alternating between the front line and a rest camp at Moyenneville, before withdrawing in mid-August to Manin, west of Arras.

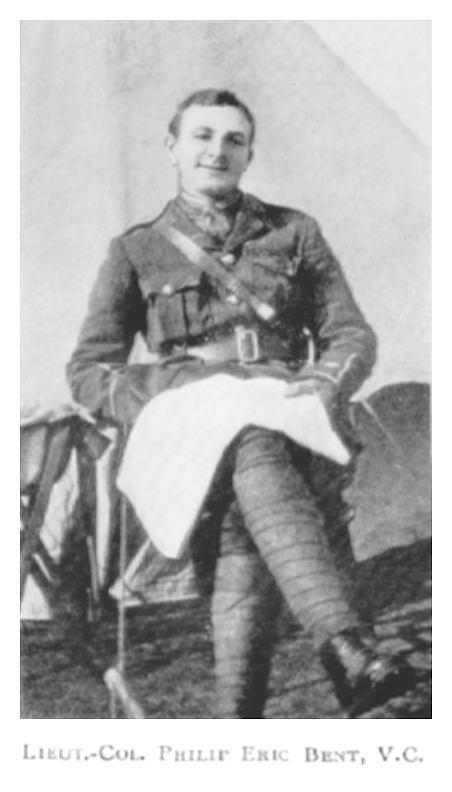
Lt-Col Philip Bent, CO of 7th Leicesters.

=== Ypres ===
In early September 21st Division was sent to the Ypres Salient, where a new offensive had been launched on 31 July. For the next phase, the Battle of the Menin Road Ridge (20 September), the division was in reserve at Caëstre, about 8 miles (13 km) from the front line. It was then brought up during the Battle of Polygon Wood, relieving 5th Australian Division in the captured wood on the night of 30 September/1 October. Just as the relief was complete, a very heavy enemy bombardment began, and a counter-attack was launched against the wood. No reinforcements could get through the barrage to assist the front line troops. Lieutenant-Col Philip Bent of 9th Leicesters was in his HQ in a pillbox when a runner arrived to say that the 'SOS' signal had been sent up by the right hand part of the battalion. Bent went forward with his HQ personnel, collected the reserve platoon and led a successful counter-attack. He was last seen calling 'Come on, the Tigers!' before he was killed. He was later awarded a posthumous Victoria Cross (VC). His body was never recovered and he is commemorated on the memorial wall at Tyne Cot Cemetery. The Germans continued their shelling throughout the day and attempted two more counter-attacks, which were broken up by rifle and machine gun fire and by accurate defensive barrages. 110th Brigade was relieved before the rest of 21st Division attacked in the Battle of Broodseinde on 4 October. It went back to Scottish Wood Camp, but remained on call to reinforce 5th Division in the event of a breakthrough; it was not required.

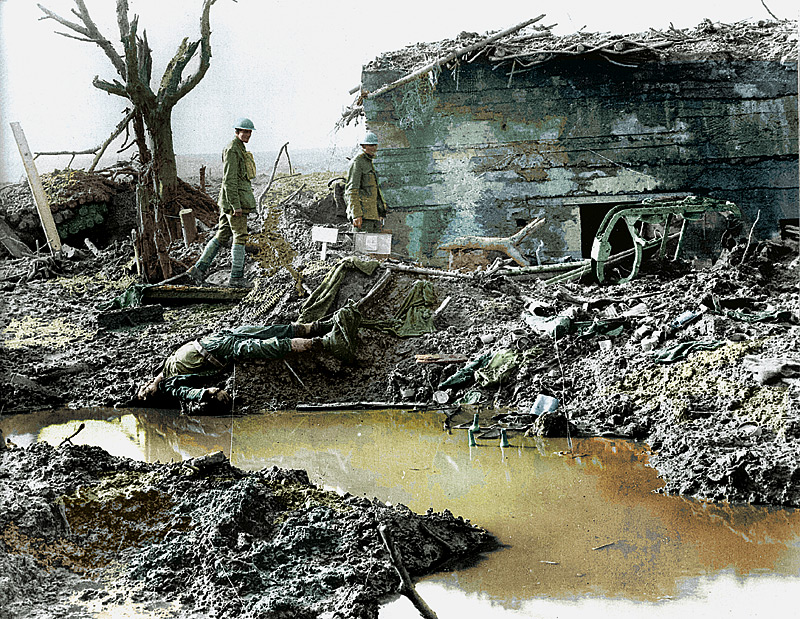
Captured German pillbox or 'Mebu' at Passchendaele

After Broodseinde the British line had been pushed forward about 1,500 yards (1,400 m) east of Polygon Wood, and when 110th Bde returned it was to hold the line of the Reutelbeke – normally a stream, but now turned into a lake by shellfire. Reutel was nominated as the boundary between two of the battalions, but their commanders could not agree on the precise location of the village, which had been totally destroyed. Battalion HQ of 8th Leicesters was in a dugout under the Butte de Polygone, a mound in the wood, but the brigade staff were unable to find the HQ of 7th Leicesters, knowing only that it was in one of dozens of pillboxes between Polygon Wood and the Menin Road, and had to rely on carrier pigeons for communications. Brigade HQ itself was in a corner of the great Hooge Crater beside the Menin Road, the two routes to which (one by 'Black Watch Corner' and the other by 'Dead Mule Dugouts') were frequently shelled and were badly affected by lingering gas. In mid-October the brigade was relieved and withdrew to Wardrecques, but by the beginning of November it was back in Polygon Wood, though the emphasis in the fighting had now shifted north to Passchendaele.

=== Winter 1917–18 ===
On 14 November 21st Division received a warning order to proceed to the Italian Front to reinforce the Italian Army after its defeat at the Battle of Caporetto. However, the order was cancelled, and instead the division was sent to the Cambrai sector, where there had been serious German counter-attacks following British successes in the attack of 20 November. The German efforts were dying down to a simple bombardment when the division arrived by train on 1 December, and the British reorganised the new front. The troops of 110th Bde set about digging new defences east of Épehy, the ruins of the village giving good observation over the enemy positions.

Brigadier-Gen Lord Loch was evacuated sick before Christmas and officially left the brigade on 4 January 1918. He was replaced by Brig-Gen Douglas Cayley, an experienced brigadier. By February 1918 the BEF was suffering a manpower crisis and it was forced to reduce each infantry brigade from four to three battalions, the remainder being disbanded to provide reinforcements to the others. The 9th Leicesters was disbanded at Moislains on 20 February and the personnel distributed to the 6th, 7th and 8th Bns in 110th Bde, to 11th Leicesters serving as pioneers with 6th Division, and to VII Corps Reinforcement Camp. In addition, the brigade MG companies were removed to form a divisional MG battalion.

=== German Spring Offensive ===
Brigadier-Gen Cayley was promoted to command 29th Division on 16 March and his successor, Brig-Gen Hanway Cumming, had barely arrived when the German spring offensive broke over the British front on 21 March. The British had adopted a system of defence in depth, with Épehy organised as large defended area in the Forward Zone. But with only three battalions, brigades found it more difficult to rotate their units, and 7th Leicesters under Lt-Col Guy Sawyer had already been in the line for more than 20 days when it was attacked. The heavy German bombardment started with a mixture of high explosive and gas at 04.40 and the attack on 21st Division's positions began at 07.00 when the enemy coming out of the fog attempted to enter the Forward Zone in front of Épehy. 21st Division had withdrawn its men from the front defences during the night, and brought down its defensive barrage on its own front line. This first attack failed, but was renewed at 09.40, when it was delayed by 8th Leicesters under Lt-Col Archibald Utterson, supported by two companies of 6th Leicesters. The German infantry did not appear in front of Épehy until 10.25 and did not reach Pezières until 11.00. Here they made a small penetration but were promptly thrown out by a counter-attack by a company of 7th Leicesters supported by two tanks. This part of 21st Division's line gave little cause for concern, but beyond Pezières 62nd Bde came under heavy pressure, the enemy breaking through the Forward Zone to engage the Battle Zone. However, the fog had now cleared and the British machine guns and field artillery could be used with effect on the enemy troops packed into the Heudicourt Valley, who made no further progress. On 110th Bde's other flank, however, the enemy had penetrated the positions of 16th (Irish) Division and a gap began to open up. The brigade used its only reserve (two companies of 6th Leicesters at Saulcourt) to form a defensive flank between Épehy and Sainte-Émilie, joined by the remnants of 2nd Royal Munster Fusiliers from 16th (I) Division.

Following the successful defence at Épehy, the Germans attacked the position with two divisions on 22 March. By the morning the defenders consisted of 6th and 8th Leicesters in the village, 7th Leicesters in Pezières, and 97th and 126th Field Companies, RE, holding the right flank. After the opening bombardment the enemy attacked out of the fog at about 08.00, one battalion managing to break in and surround some of the posts in the southern end of Épehy. Brigade HQ still had a buried telephone cable open to 8th Leicesters, and about 09.30 it ordered the 6th and 8th Leicesters and the two RE companies to fall back and form a defensive flank on the Saulcourt–Épehy road to link up with 39th Division filling the gap where 16th Division had been broken. But 21st Division was now in danger of being isolated and was forced to withdraw. Two companies of 7th Leicesters continued to hold Pezières and covered the retirement of 110th Bde. The withdrawal was carried out down the communication trenches, but the enemy had machine guns trained on the exits from these trenches, which caused considerable casualties. Lt-Col W.N. Stewart of 6th Leicesters was killed by a sniper in front of his HQ, while Lt-Col Utterson of 8th Leicesters was captured in his HQ at 'Fisher's Keep' in Épehy as the Germans cleared the village. Of the rearguard companies of 7th Leicesters, only one officer and 14 ORs survived to be captured. The 'Brown Line' at the rear of Épehy was occupied by Brigade HQ personnel, an RE company, and 110th TMB, but they were mostly cut off and killed or captured. However, German attempts to follow 110th Bde were temporarily checked by two tanks from 4th Tank Battalion before they were knocked out by direct hits. By the end of the day the whole of 21st Division had withdrawn to the 'Green Line', and 110th Bde had gone into reserve, but was called back during the night to reinforce the weak 62nd Bde, not reaching its position until 04.30.

Next day (23 March), the situation being critical, 21st Division was ordered to fight a rearguard action back to a new line at Ablainzevelle. The Divisional HQ issued its orders at 07.30, but the Germans had already renewed their attacks at 07.20. The Green Line was unfinished, in places dug only 1 foot (0.30 m) deep, and casualties from the bombardment were heavy. The remnants of 62nd and 110th Bdes were temporarily formed into a composite brigade commanded by Lt-Col B.D. Fisher of 1st Lincolnshire Regiment of 62nd Bde. A sudden infantry attack out of the mist broke through 110th Bde's line between Bois de Gurlu and Bois de l'Epinette, and quickly spread southwards into that of 62nd Bde. The battalions were driven out of position, those of 110th Bde on the left going back almost 1 mile (1.6 km) to the Péronne–Nurlu road. Here they held the enemy thanks to rifle fire from the reserve still in the Bois de Gurlu. At 11.00 the orders to withdraw to Ablainzevelle finally reached the 110th Bde troops, 62nd Bde having already received theirs and fought their way back there with some of 110th Bde. Lieutenant-Col Sawyer of 7th Leicesters led the rest of 110th Bde safely across the Peronne Canal. The German success against 62nd/110th Bde meant that the rest of 21st Division had to withdraw rapidly. But even on the Ablainzevelle line, with its artillery raking the enemy advancing down the opposite slopes, the division had both its flanks 'in the air'. In the afternoon it fell back behind the Tortille river, with 62nd/110th Bde on the high ground to the left, overlooking Allaines. Here its flank was turned and it went back further, 62nd/110th Bde occupying old trenches covering Bouchavesnes until nightfall when it slipped back to rejoin 21st Division.

The fighting of 24 and 25 March was later designated the First Battle of Bapaume. It began with a short bombardment by German artillery and trench mortars, then between 08.00 and 08.30 a considerable enemy force came out of the mist and attacked 21st Division's forward positions. 110th Brigade was echeloned back to fill the gap to the South African Bde of 9th (Scottish) Division and escaped the worst of this attack, but by 09.00 64th Bde was falling back, and 62nd and most of 110th Bde had to follow, dropping back in two stages to the high ground south-east of Maurepas. The South African Bde, together with some of 7th Leicesters, held its position and was annihilated. At this point the first troops of 35th Division began to appear behind 21st Division, having marched as fast as possible from the railhead. Together with a Canadian motor machine gun battery and the crews of 4th Tank Battalion, who had abandoned their vehicles owing to lack of petrol, but came into the line dismounted with their Lewis guns, they held the German advance for five hours. By 16.00 Brig-Gen Cumming of 110th Bde was commanding 'Cumming's Force', consisting of elements from all three of 21st Division's brigades, operating under the orders of 35th Division. At 17.00, with most of his troops having arrived, the commander of 35th Division fell back to a previously selected position from Montauban to the River Somme at Curlu and allowed 21st division's troops to be withdrawn. Next day another 'ad hoc' force to support 35th Division was formed from troops of 21st Division at Suzanne: 'Headlam's Force' of about 1500 men under Brig-Gen H.R. Headlam of 64th Bde had a composite battalion from each of the three brigades and a composite machine gun company. The rest of 21st Division was sent back to Chipilly. 35th Division held on all day through 25 March until reinforcements arrived to fill the gap between Montauban and Bazentin-le-Grand. The 'Great Retreat' was still continuing elsewhere, and 35th Division got away during the night of 25/26 March unnoticed by the enemy. It took up new positions with Headlam's Force on the right.

VII Corps ordered 35th Division to continue its retirement on 26 March. To help cover this movement another group was formed from the available troops of 21st Division: 'McCulloch's Force', a composite battalion of about 1200 men formed from the divisional pioneer battalion (14th Northumberland Fusiliers) with elements from all three brigades, under the command of Lt-Col J.A. McCulloch of 9th King's Own Yorkshire Light Infantry (64th Bde). This was assembled by 08.00 in rear of the right flank of the line. All remaining troops of 21st Division not in Cumming's or Headlam's Forces were then moved back to Bresle. VII Corps' retirement proved unnecessary, but it was too late to change the orders and the troops crossed the River Ancre. The recall order arrived at 19.00 and Brig-Gen Headlam was prepared to recross the river, but was overruled. McCulloch's force remained on the other side as rearguard, now under Brig-Gen Cumming, who had also taken over 'Hadow's Force' formed from the remnants of 26th Bde of 9th (S) Division. By early morning of 27 March VII Corps' front line between the Somme and the Ancre was being held by Cumming's Force under 110th Bde's staff. This composite force also included labour troops, digging in between Ribemont and Sailly-le-Sec. 3rd Australian Division began arriving early on 27 March and began taking over command of the whole sector, including all the composite forces ('Gater's Force' had been formed on 28 March under Brig-Gen G.H. Gater of 62nd Bde, with composite battalions from each of 21st Division's three brigades plus 66 Lewis gun teams from 4th Tank Bn). However, the retreat had ended, and all of 21st Division's troops were withdrawn on 30–31 March and reformed at Allonville. 110th Brigade's casualties since 21 March had been 31 officers and about 1200 ORs, or about half its effective strength.

=== The Lys ===
On the night of 1/2 April 21st Division entrained at Amiens for the Ypres Salient. It rested and received some reinforcements and then 110th Bde went into the line south of the Menin Road on 9/10 April, its positions including the 'Tower Hamlets' ridge and 'Shrewsbury Forest'. The sector was now so quiet that BHQ could be housed in unprotected huts, though deep dugouts had been prepared further back. However, Flanders had been chosen by the Germans for the next phase of their spring offensive (the Battle of the Lys), launched on 9 April south of the Salient. Their rapid progress made the Salient increasingly vulnerable and plans were made to evacuate the forward positions. All HQs and artillery and most infantry units were withdrawn closer to Ypres, leaving only outposts in the front line. On 15 April 110th Bde fell back 3 miles (4.8 km) to new positions along the Ypres–St Eloi road, leaving one battalion in the old line. Brigade HQ was at 'Walker Camp' in huts behind a farmhouse at Dickebusch, hitherto in the rear area. The Germans swept over Mont Kemmel on 25 April and 21st Division now had to form a flank guard for the southern side of the Salient. Dickebusch came under heavy artillery fire and 110th Bde's outpost battalion was evacuated on the night of 26/27 April. The new front line astride the Ypres–Comines Canal was under constant fire and German patrols were feeling their way along the canal. On the night of 27/28 April an entire company at 'Lankhof Farm' near the canal disappeared during a German raid. On the afternoon of 29 April 110th Bde's posts by the 'Iron Bridge' on the canal were attacked but held firm. The brigade was relieved on the night of 30 April/1 May.

=== Aisne ===
21st Division was one of a number of exhausted divisions that were sent south under IX Corps to recuperate with Fifth French Army on a quiet part of the front. Its battalions were brought up to a strength of about 700 men each, the replacements being either barely trained (aged 18 ½) or returning wounded. It was stationed in the angle between the River Aisne and the Aisne Canal, 110th Bde taking over the Chalons-le-Vergeur sector on the night of 14/15 May, with two companies each of 7th and 8th Leicesters in the Forward Zone about 1,500 yards (1,400 m) east of the marshy canal, the rest in the Battle Zone along the west bank, and 6th Leicesters and 110th TMB in reserve. Unfortunately, once again the quiet sector to which 21st Division had been sent for recuperation was that chosen by the enemy for the next phase of their offensive. 110th Brigade's observation teams reported German artillery teams returning from deploying fresh guns during the night, linesmen laying new telephone cables, and other unmistakeable signs of preparation for an attack, supported by reports from other British units along the line, by reconnaissance aircraft and by German deserters. At 01.00 on 27 May the Third Battle of the Aisne was launched with a tremendous bombardment on the French and British lines, including a high proportion of gas shells. The telephone lines laid on the surface by the French were soon cut by shellfire. The infantry attack on 110th Bde probably began at 03.00–04.00, but this was unclear – no word came back from the four advanced companies before they were overwhelmed. Attacks on the redoubts of the Battle Zone along the canal began about 07.00 but the situation remained obscure until the mist dispersed about 08.00. The near bank of the canal was lost, but 110th Bde's battalions fought on, and held the enemy in the swamps fringing the canal. Two attacks were driven back with rifle and Lewis gun fire, so the enemy resorted to bombing their way up communication trenches to surround and capture the strongpoints one by one. One strongpoint, the 'Tenaille de Guise', held out until 15.00. 6th Leicesters was fed forward into the fighting line, together with a company made up from the 'battle reserve' of 7th and 8th Leicesters; the road between Cauroy and Cormicy became the front line, which 110th Bde held until nightfall. After dark 21st Division wheeled its left back so as not to be outflanked, while maintaining contact with the French to the right. After some stiff rearguard fighting 110th Bde on the left of this line was able to occupy some prepared trenches about 24.00, and was setting up BHQ at Vaux-Varennes, only to find that there was no sign of 8th Division, which was supposed to be in Bouvancourt, covering the brigade's left flank. German patrols were actually behind 110th Bde, which only got away by following a circuitous cross-country track. At 03.30 on 28 May the brigade, reorganised into a single battalion, followed its brigadier along this track in complete silence. At dawn it halted at Luthernay Farm where it was bombed by a lone German aircraft. Here it received orders to take up a line south-west of Hermonville as reserve to the rest of 21st Division. It set off again, without 6th Leicesters, whose orders did not arrive because a dispatch-rider was wounded, and which stayed with 64th Bde, but with elements of 62nd Bde mixed up in 110th's column. About 08.00 it got within 500 yards (460 m) of Pévy when it came under fire from the village and the high ground on the right. Breaking up into a number of single-file columns, the brigade struggled across a swamp to reach the high Prouilly ridge; luckily the Germans fired too high. As the brigade climbed the ridge the skyline was crowned by a wave of French infantry, and together they formed an all-round defence until the German artillery finally caught up and forced them off. By nightfall the remains of 110th Bde were back across the River Vesle, reorganised as two small battalions, which took up new positions at a tile works west of Muizon and on Hill 202, with BHQ in Rosnay. The following morning the Germans chose not to make a frontal assault on the Vesle but to continue the turning movement through Jonchery while shelling 110th Bde's positions. The force on Hill 202 was driven to lower ground and Lt-Col Edward Chance, CO of 6th Leicesters, was killed by a shell, and the line at Muizon under Lt-Col Sawyer of 7th Leicesters was driven back to within 1,000 yards (910 m) of Rosnay. BHQ was shelled out of Rosnay and withdrew to Méry-Prémecy by the end of the day. Here the brigade was relieved at 21.00 by French troops and withdrew to rejoin 21st Division at Étréchy on 31 May. At the Aisne 110th Bde lost 52 officers and 1378 ORs, of whom 33 officers and 1168 were posted as missing.

On 31 May 21st Division formed 21st Independent Brigade (or 'Gater's Brigade') under the command of Brig-Gen Gater of 62nd Bde. This consisted of small composite battalions drawn from each of the infantry brigades, with supporting troops, totalling about 1200 men. It moved forward on 1 June and next day occupied the line south of the River Marne between Dormans and Verneuil under Fifth French Army. On 19 June it returned to 21st Division in the Abbeville area.

After the casualties sustained during the German offensives, the BEF's commander-in-chief, Field Marshal Sir Douglas Haig decided to use his scarce 'Class A' reinforcements to rebuild 8th and 21st Divisions from the Aisne front. However, this would take six weeks, and the reinforcements were insufficient. In 110th Bde 8th Leicesters was reduced to a training cadre on 28 June and the surplus men drafted to the 7th Leicesters. The cadre was posted to 25th Division and then sent to England where it was used on 7 July to form a new 14th Duke of Wellington's Regiment at Clacton-on-Sea. (This battalion was disbanded on 3 November 1918.) 8th Leicesters was replaced in 110th Bde by 1st Wiltshire Regiment from 25th Division, so that it was no longer a purely Leicestershire formation.

=== Hundred Days Offensive ===
Towards the end of July the reconstituted 21st Division joined V Corps under Third Army in the Somme Sector. 110th Brigade took over trenches along the Acre facing Thiepval, with BHQ in shelters along a sunken road west of Englebelmer. The Allied Hundred Days Offensive was launched with the Battle of Amiens on 8 August, and 21st Division followed up by crossing the marshy Ancre on 21 August as part of the Battle of Albert. Four companies of 6th and 7th Leicesters managed to slip across in the morning fog, but could not maintain themselves there once the fog lifted. That night, however, 98th Field Company, RE, improved the crossings and 6th Leicesters were able to push patrols across. Next day the battalion sent two companies across north of St Pierre Divion and they bombed their way up trenches to get in contact with 62nd Bde. On the night of 23/24 August 64th Bde made a bold moonlight advance, followed by 110th. In the morning 110th Bde concentrated in Battery Valley and pushed against enemy posts guarding the ends of side valleys, but got up at midday to extend 64th Bde's line to the right. At 17.00 110th Bde was ordered to advance on Le Sars with artillery covering fire, to fill the gap to 17th (Northern) Division further right. 6th Leicesters lost direction and was late starting, so 1st Wiltshires advanced alone at 20.00 in the dark, crossing country devastated by the fighting of 1916, and passing between German troops. 6th Leicesters caught up but did not advance so far. Brigade HQ found enemy all round its proposed position and had to slip back, but the brigade held its advanced position all night. V Corps issued orders for a pursuit next day, with 62nd and 110th Bdes leapfrogging each other forwards. However, 62nd Bde's initial advance was immediately checked by machine gun fire from high ground north of Le Sars and they lost their barrage. 62nd Brigade resumed its advance at 11.00, taking the Butte de Warlencourt, but at 14.00 110th Bde was diverted to fill the gap to 17th (N) Division and 21st Division made no further advance that day. 110th Brigade remained in position on 26 August until 17th (N) Division caught up, then went into reserve. Next day the brigade was ordered to pass through 64th Bde and continue the attack. It was already moving forward when the attack was cancelled, and staff officers had to run forward to recall the units. 110th Brigade did advance on 29 August, encountering little opposition for 3,000 yards (2,700 m) until it was stopped by frontal machine gun fire from Beaulencourt.

The offensive continued with the Second Battle of Bapaume. On 1 September 110th Bde put in a textbook attack on Beaulencourt. Taking advantage of a neighbouring division's advance north of the village, 1st Wiltshire and 6th Leicesters attacked from that direction instead of frontally. The artillery had fired several 'crashes' during the night, and the opening of the barrage at Zero (02.00) seemed a mere repetition. The two battalions advanced in the dark behind a slow barrage creeping at 100 yards (91 m) every six minutes, taking the enemy completely by surprise, capturing 126 prisoners, two field guns and numerous anti-tank guns at a cost of 5 killed and 50 wounded, and establishing a line 200 yards (180 m) beyond the south and east sides of the village. Next day the brigade was ordered to capture the sugar factory north of Le Transloy. 7th Leicesters achieved this behind another night barrage at 02.00, then the factory was retaken by a German counter-attack about 04.30, before it was regained at 07.00 and then firmly held.

On 3 September 21st Division was squeezed out by the converging advance, and it was not until 10 September that 110th Bde was back in the line, holding the sector in front of Épehy, by which time the advance had progressed as far as the Canal du Nord. It was relieved on the night of 15/16 September, but that night BHQ's tents were bombed from the air, suffering about 30 per cent casualties among its specialist personnel. 21st Division made another set-piece attack at the Battle of Épehy on 18 September. 62nd Brigade was completely successful in taking both its objectives, then the divisional front widened and both 64th and 110th Bdes passed through to attack the third objective. 58th (2/1st London) Division on the right had failed to reach its objective, so 6th Leicesters on that flank was held up by enfilade fire and could not get further forward than the road about 1,000 yards (910 m) short of its own objective. 1st Wiltshires did reach it, but were counter-attacked and fell back to join the 6th Leicesters. Overall the division had been very successful – 110th Bde captured 426 prisoners and 8 field guns – but there was still a pocket of Germans holding out between 64th and 110th Bdes. 21st Division was relieved on the night of 19/20 September.

The Allies launched a coordinated series of attacks on 28 September. 21st Division went forward in a preliminary operation that day, and when 110th Bde took over the lead in late morning it advanced almost without opposition. But during Third Army's main attack next day (the opening of the Battle of the St Quentin Canal ) it achieved almost nothing. 110th Brigade attacked after moonrise at 03.30 across a misty valley, with the support of two tanks and a deep barrage. One of the brigade's three leading companies made 500 yards (460 m), but the other two were held up. Nevertheless, the general success of the offensive meant that the Germans opposing 21st Division retreated to the Honnecourt–Banteux canal on 30th September. For some days the brigade faced the enemy across the canal, night patrols trying to find a way across. Then on 5 October the enemy withdrew again, to the Beaurevoir Line: 110th Bde was across the broken bridges by 10.00 and by the evening BHQ had been established in the old Hindenburg Line.

Preparations immediately began for the next offensive bound, the Battle of Cambrai on 8 October. V Corps planned to carry the Beaurevoir Line in a preliminary night attack. 21st Division launched its assault at 01.00 with 64th and 110th Bdes supported by plentiful artillery and six tanks coming into action after dawn. 1st Wiltshire would capture a road and trenches east of Montecouvez Farm then 6th and 7th Leicesters, starting from ground captured by the Wiltshires, would swing northwards at 05.00 and attack Ardissart Farm. The complicated attack went off without a hitch, both brigades taking the Beaurevoir Line without difficulty despite heavy German shellfire on Montecouvez Farm. 110th Brigade then reached its second objective overlooking the Sargrenon Valley. It later extended its line to the north, cutting off and destroying a complete German battalion, before 62nd Bde took over and continued the advance. 110th Brigade had taken 4 field guns, 67 machine guns, six trench mortars and 624 prisoners. Although ordered to attack yet again that evening, Brig-Gen Cumming objected and got the order cancelled.

The Germans carried out another large-scale withdrawal, and 110th Bde was billeted in the liberated village of Caullery, with BHQ in Montecouvez Farm. The brigade moved up on 22 October to prepare for next morning's attack, the Battle of the Selle. 1st Wiltshire and 7th Leicesters formed up on one of the roads leading towards Ovillers in enemy territory, but the Germans chose to lay a violent barrage on this road just before Zero at 02.00. Nonetheless the two battalions cleared Ovillers, 6th Leicesters coming up to assist east of the village and then continuing the advance towards Vendegies at 07.15 while two tanks helped to mop up Ovillers. One company worked round the wood in front of Vendegies Chateau and took it in flank, capturing the German regimental commander. 110th Brigade HQ took over the chateau.

On the night of 26/27 October the division was relieved in the front line. After some reorganisation it took over the left sector of V Corps' front from 29 October to 3 November. On 5 November it marched through the Forêt de Mormal before attacking and capturing Berlaimont. During the night two companies of 1st Lincolns (62nd Bde) got across the River Sambre on planks at a damaged lock, followed by 6th Leicesters and 1st Wiltshires who had been held up by machine guns, and they organised a bridgehead. On 7 November the division pushed on with 110th Bde in the lead to the Maubeuge–Avesnes road, finding no resistance. 64th Brigade then took the lead and the division reached Éclaibes. 21st Division was then relieved in the front line and withdrew to Berlaimont to rest and reorganise in the Sambre Valley. It was still halted there when the Armistice with Germany brought hostilities to an end at 11.00 on 11 November.

=== Post-Armistice ===
On 12 November the division began moving to Beaufort, east of the Maubeuge–Avesnes road, where it undertook training and recreation for the rest of the month. Between 12 and 20 December it moved back to the south of the Somme, west of Amiens, and demobilisation began, continuing through the early months of 1919. Large numbers were demobilised during March and others were drafted to various units in the Army of Occupation in Germany. On 1 April the remainder of the division was concentrated around Longpré and during April and May the cadres of its units began returning to the UK. 21st Division's HQs closed down on 19 May 1919.

110th Brigade was not reformed during World War II.

Maj-Gen Sir Guy Bainbridge, 110th Bde's first commander.

== Commanders ==
The following officers commanded 110th Bde:

- Brig-Gen Guy Bainbridge, appointed 8 April 1915; promoted to command 25th Division 1 June 1916
- Lt-Col Edward Challenor, acting 1 June 1916
- Brig-Gen William Hessey, appointed 9 June 1916; sick 20 June 1917
- Lt-Col W.N. Stewart, acting 20 June 1917 and 4 January 1918
- Brig-Gen Lord Loch, appointed 22 July 1917; sick 4 January 1918
- Brig-Gen Douglas Cayley, appointed 4 January 1918; promoted to command 29th Division 16 March 1918
- Brig-Gen Hanway Cumming, appointed 16 March 1918

== Insignia ==
21st Division's formation sign consisted of a circle of three red 7s (for 21) conjoined at the base on a black disc. In 1915 the division adopted a system of geometric shapes in brigade colours to distinguish its units. 110th Brigade's signs were yellow, and were worn by the infantry on both sleeves and on the back below the collar. In 1917 these were:

- 6th Leicesters: a circle, with a black square on the left collar point
- 7th Leicesters: a rectangle, with a red square on the left collar point
- 8th Leicesters: a square
- 9th Leicesters: a triangle, with a yellow square on the left collar point
  The collar squares were restricted to men who had served since 1915. If 110th MG Company followed the rest of the divisional scheme it wore a yellow oval. 110th TMB wore a yellow diamond on the back.
