= Edward Loch, 2nd Baron Loch =

Major-General The Right Honourable The Lord Loch CB CMG MVO DSO

Personal details
- Born: 4 April 1873
- Died: 14 August 1942 (aged 69) London, England
- Resting place: Stoke-by-Clare, Suffolk
- Relations: Henry Loch, 1st Baron Loch
- Occupation: Captain of the Yeomen of the Guard; Deputy Lieutenant of Suffolk; Chairman, Greyhound Racing Association
- Awards: Distinguished Service Order; Member of the Royal Victorian Order; Companion of the Order of St Michael and St George; Companion of the Order of the Bath; Croix d'Officier of the Légion d'Honneur (france

Military service
- Allegiance: United Kingdom
- Branch/service: Cape Colonial Forces; British Army
- Years of service: 1893–1922
- Rank: Major-General
- Unit: Grenadier Guards
- Commands: 110th Infantry Brigade
- Battles/wars: Sudan Campaign; Second Boer War; First World War

Major-General Edward Douglas Loch, 2nd Baron Loch, CB, CMG, MVO, DSO (4 April 1873 – 14 August 1942) was a senior British Army officer and peer.

After serving in Cape Colonial Forces in South Africa he joined the Grenadier Guards in 1893. He first saw active service in the Sudan Campaign in 1898, receiving the first of many decorations. He served on the staff during the Second Boer War, and was further honoured. In 1911, in addition to his army duties, he became a member of the Royal Household of the United Kingdom. During the First World War, he initially continued to serve in staff positions, but commanded a brigade later in the war before returning to the staff. He received further decorations, both British and foreign.

After his retirement from the army in 1922, he became Deputy Lieutenant of Suffolk and undertook various other public and charitable duties. He was also Captain of the Yeomen of the Guard and chairman of the Greyhound Racing Association.

== Early life and military career ==
Loch was the son of Henry Loch, 1st Baron Loch, and his wife Elizabeth Villiers, daughter of the Hon. EE Villiers and niece of the 4th Earl of Clarendon. He was educated at Winchester College. He then went to the Colony of the Cape of Good Hope and served in the locally raised militia, the Cape Colonial Forces, rising to the rank of lieutenant. He transferred to the regular British Army on 3 May 1893 when he was commissioned as a second lieutenant in the Grenadier Guards. He was promoted to lieutenant on 12 May 1897. He fought in the Sudan Campaign in 1898, being Mentioned in Despatches for his part in the Battle of Omdurman, and awarded the Distinguished Service Order on 15 November 1898. He was also awarded the Khedive's Star and clasp.

== Boer War and following years ==
Loch was seconded from his regiment to the staff on 9 October 1899, serving as divisional signalling officer, South African Field Force in the Second Boer War. He was promoted captain on 28 January 1900, this was subsequently backdated to 30 November 1899. He inherited the title Baron Loch on the death of his father in 1900. He was Mentioned in Despatches again in April 1901, and on 19 April it was announced he would receive a brevet promotion to major, dated 29 November 1900. He participated in the battles of Belmont, Enslin, Modder River and Magersfontein, was badly wounded and received the Queen's South Africa Medal with four clasps.

Loch returned to regimental duty in the Grenadier Guards on 23 January 1902, and took part in a special diplomatic mission to promote British interests in Morocco in early 1902. He was appointed a Member of the Royal Victorian Order (MVO) on 30 May 1902, following the presentation by King Edward VII of State colours to the King's Company of the Grenadier Guards. The following year, he was appointed adjutant of the 1st battalion on 26 January 1903, and held the post until 1 July 1905. On 22 January 1908 he began the staff course at Staff College, Camberley, and he was promoted substantive major on 15 August 1908. He was brigade major of the 3rd Infantry Brigade from 12 April 1910, when he took over from Major Richard Butler, later a lieutenant general, to 16 August 1911, when he became a General Staff Officer (GSO), Grade 2 at the War Office. On 4 December 1911 he became Lord-in-waiting to King George V and he received brevet lieutenant-colonelcy on 10 May 1913. He left the War Office on 12 April 1914.

== First World War ==
After the outbreak of the First World War Loch served with the BEF Staff in August 1914, when he was made a GSO2. He was liaison officer between GHQ and Horace Smith-Dorrien's II Corps. On 16 December 1914 was appointed a general staff officer, grade 1 of the 28th Division.

Loch was given substantive promotion to lieutenant colonel on 13 March 1915 and continued to serve as the 28th Division's GSO1 during the Second Battle of Ypres. On 27 May he was promoted to temporary brigadier general and became brigadier general, general staff of VI Corps. He was appointed a Companion of the Order of St Michael and St George the next month. He received a brevet colonelcy on 1 January 1916. He served as chief of staff in VI Corps. He received the Croix d'Officier of the Légion d'Honneur in 1917. On 22 July 1917 he was given command of 110th Brigade in 21st Division. He was appointed Companion of the Order of the Bath in the 1918 New Year Honours. He returned to the staff on 16 May 1918. He was promoted major-general "for valuable services rendered in connection with the War" in the 1919 New Year Honours. During the war he was Mentioned in Despatches a further five times.

== Retirement ==
Loch, promoted to substantive lieutenant colonel on 27 November 1918, retired from the army in 1922. He was appointed a deputy lieutenant of Suffolk on 27 February 1922, when he was living at Stoke College, Stoke-by-Clare. From 1924 to 1925 he was captain of the Yeomen of the Guard. He also became president of the Legion of Frontiersmen. He was still in the Reserve of Officers at the outbreak of the Second World War in September 1939, but was not recalled for service. However, when the Home Guard was formed, he served as an area commander, despite being over-age, and this position being equivalent in rank only to a brigadier.

In 1927, Loch became chairman of the Greyhound Racing Association. In 1931 this involved him in the case of Mick the Miller, which led to a controversial rerun of the Greyhound Derby. He became Captain of the Yeoman of the Guard again in 1929. In 1931 he took part in the America's Cup on the yacht Candide.

Loch had an estate in Suffolk and was an alderman on West Suffolk County Council. Other positions he held included chairman of the United Service Fund, chairman of governors of Dulwich College and associate joint treasurer for University College, London.

== Family ==
Loch married Lady Margaret Louisa Lizzie Compton, daughter of William Compton, 5th Marquess of Northampton, on 6 June 1905. They had two sons and three daughters, and he was succeeded by both sons, first George Loch, 3rd Baron Loch and then Spencer Loch, 4th Baron Loch. He died in a London hospital on 14 August 1942, his funeral service was at the Guards Chapel, Wellington Barracks, London on 20 August 1942, followed by burial at Stoke-by-Clare.

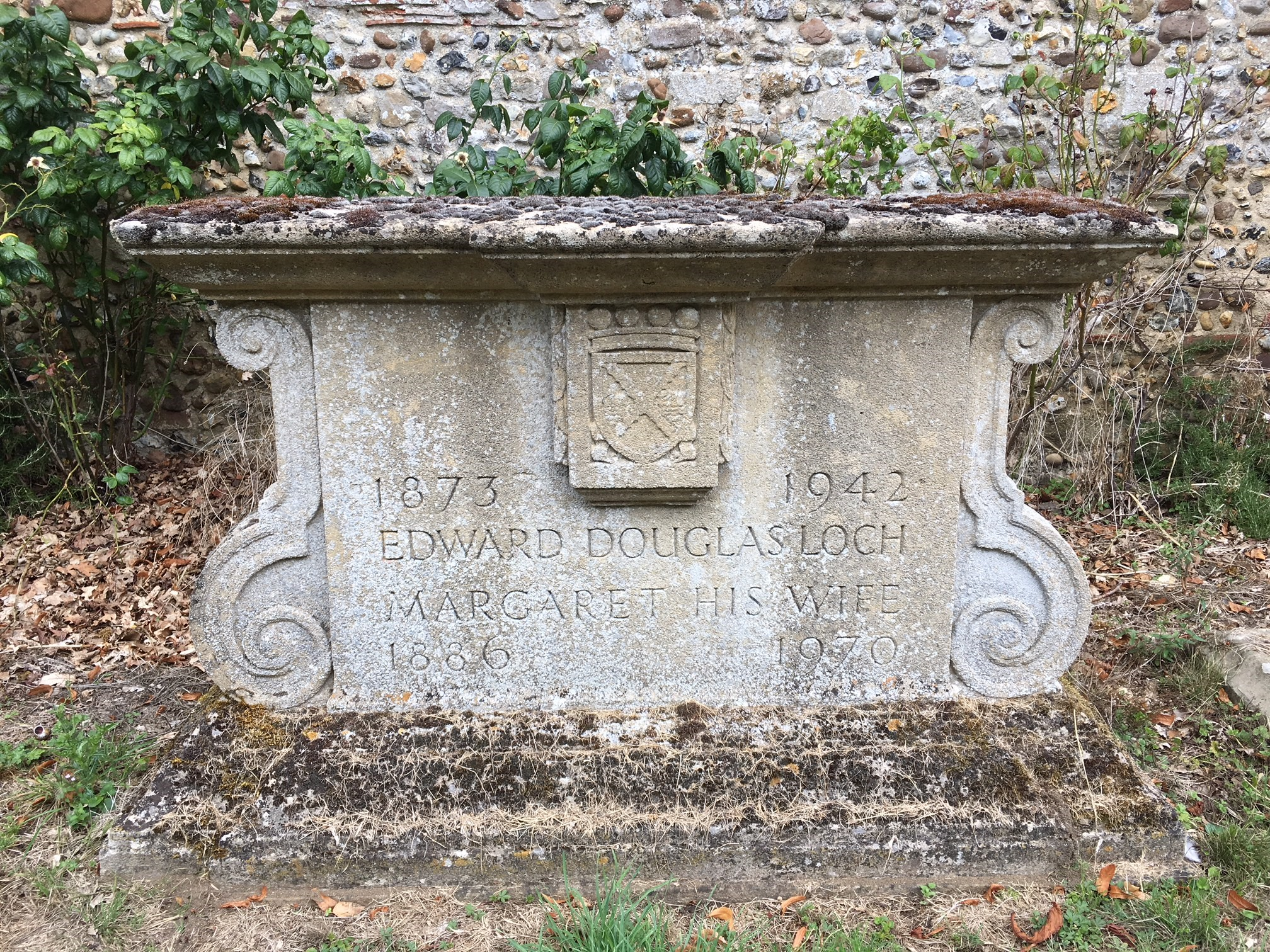
The grave of Edward Loch, 2nd Baron Loch, in the churchyard of St John the Baptist, Stoke-by-Clare

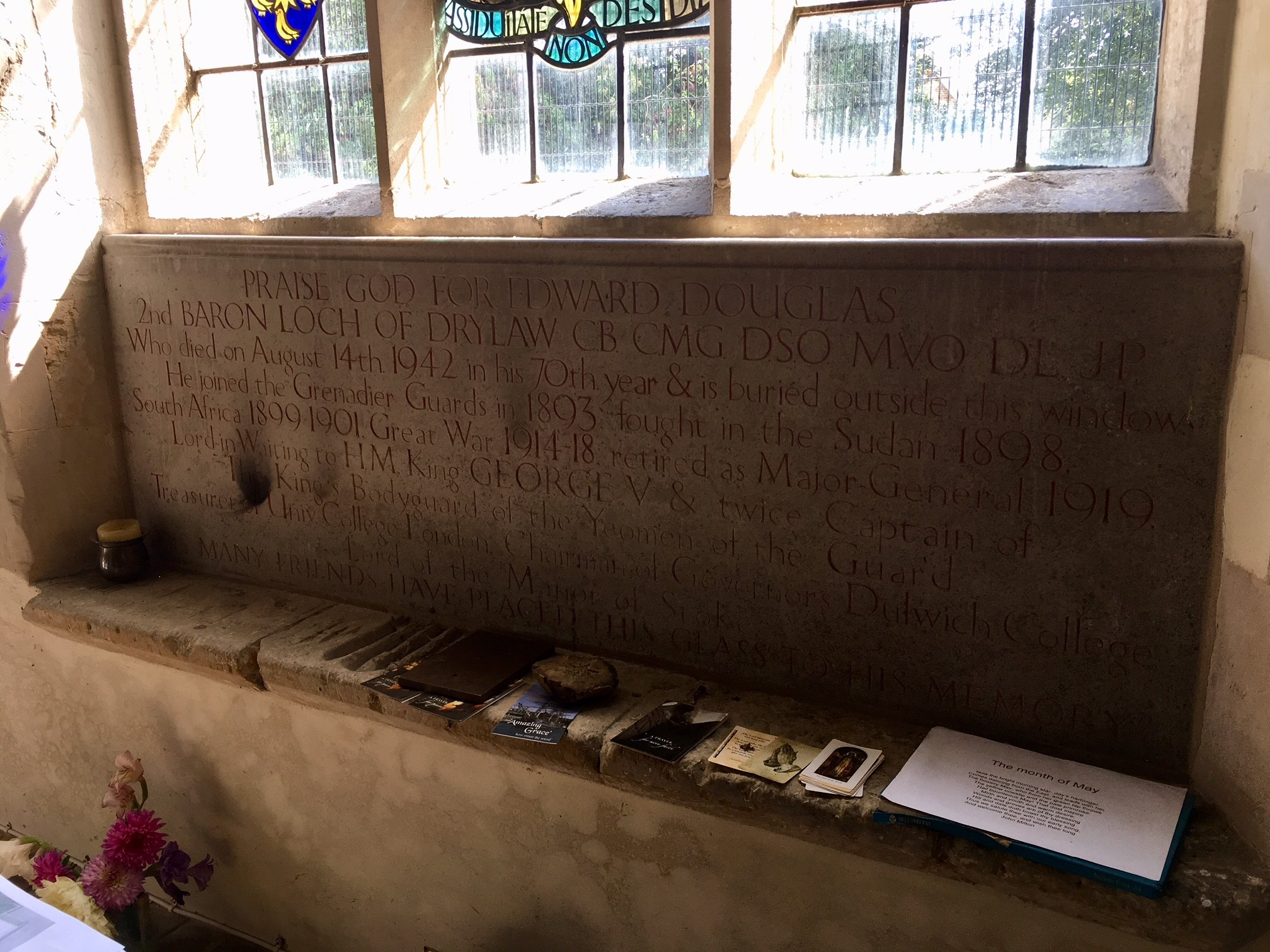
Memorial to Edward Loch, 2nd Baron Loch, in the church of St John the Baptist, Stoke-by-Clare

Political offices
Preceded by The Lord Hylton	Captain of the Yeomen of the Guard; 1924	Succeeded by The Lord Desborough
Preceded by The Lord Desborough	Captain of the Yeomen of the Guard; 1929–1931	Succeeded by The Lord Strathcona and Mount Royal
Peerage of the United Kingdom
Preceded by Henry Loch	Baron Loch; 1900–1942	Succeeded by George Loch
