= Henry Loch, 1st Baron Loch =

British soldier and colonial administrator

The Right Honourable The Lord Loch GCB GCMG PC
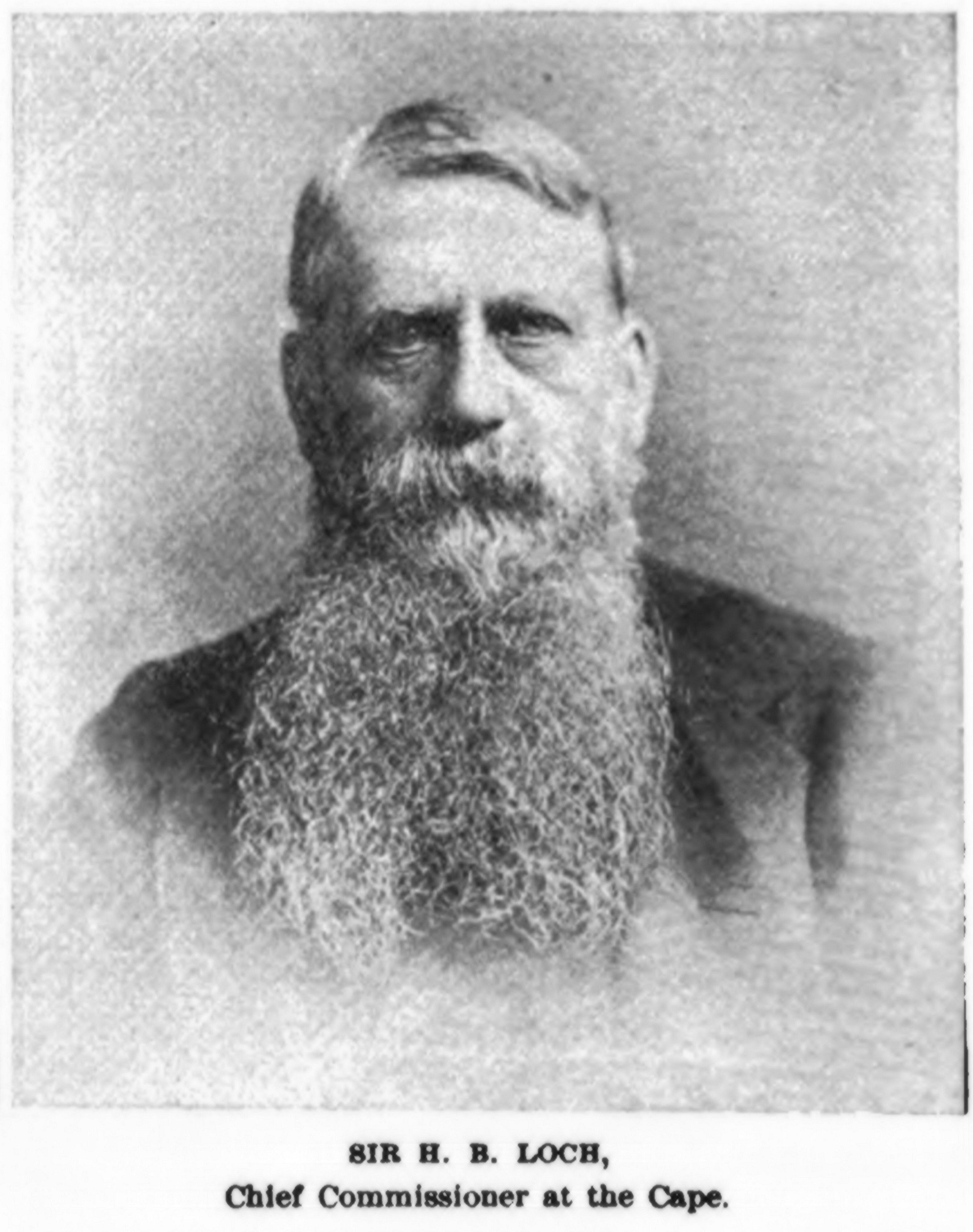
- The Cape High Commissioner" 1891

Lieutenant Governor of the Isle of Man
- In office 1863–1882
- Monarch: Queen Victoria
- Preceded by: Francis Conant
- Succeeded by: Spencer Walpole

Governor of Victoria
- In office 1884–1889
- Monarch: Queen Victoria
- Preceded by: Marquess of Normanby
- Succeeded by: Earl of Hopetoun

High Commissioner for Southern Africa
- In office 1889–1895
- Monarch: Victoria
- Preceded by: Sir Hercules Robinson
- Succeeded by: The Lord Rosmead

Personal details
- Born: Henry Brougham Loch; 23 May 1827
- Died: 20 June 1900 (aged 73) London, England
- Spouse: Elizabeth Villiers

Military service
- Branch/service: British East India Company
- Battles/wars: First Anglo-Sikh War; Crimean War; Second Opium War

Henry Brougham Loch, 1st Baron Loch, GCB, GCMG, PC (23 May 1827 – 20 June 1900) was a British soldier and colonial administrator.

== Military service ==
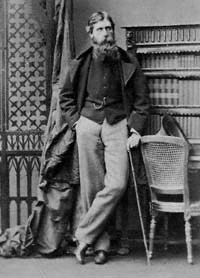
Henry Brougham Loch, 1861, by Camille Silvy

Henry Loch was the son of James Loch, Member of Parliament, of Drylaw, Midlothian. He entered the Royal Navy, but at the end of two years quit it for the British East India Company's military service, and in 1842 obtained a commission in the Bengal Light Cavalry. In the First Anglo-Sikh War of 1845–1846 he was given an appointment on the staff of Sir Hugh Gough, and served throughout the Sutlej campaign. In 1852 he became adjutant of Skinner's Horse.

At the outbreak of the Crimean War in 1854, Loch severed his connection with India, and obtained leave to raise a body of irregular Bulgarian cavalry, which he commanded throughout the war. In 1857 he was appointed attaché to Lord Elgin's mission to East Asia, was present at the taking of Canton (Guangzhou) during the Second Opium War, and in 1858 brought home the Treaty of Yedo.

In April 1860, Loch accompanied Lord Elgin to China again, as secretary of the new embassy sent to secure the execution by the Chinese Qing Empire of its treaty engagements. The embassy was backed up by an allied Anglo-French force. With Harry Smith Parkes he negotiated the surrender of the Taku Forts (Dagu Forts). During the advance on the Qing capital, Peking (Beijing), Loch was chosen with Parkes to complete the preliminary negotiations for peace at Tungchow (present-day Tongzhou District, Beijing). They were accompanied by a small party of officers and Sikhs. It having been discovered that the Chinese were planning an attack on the British force, Loch rode back and warned the outposts. He then returned to Parkes and his party under a flag of truce in the hope of securing their safety. However, they were all taken prisoner by the Qing general Sengge Rinchen and incarcerated in the Ministry of Justice (or Board of Punishments) in Beijing, where the majority of the group died from torture or disease. Parkes and Loch were treated less barbarically after Prince Gong intervened. After three weeks, the negotiations for their release were successful, but they had only been liberated ten minutes when orders were received from the Xianfeng Emperor, who was then taking shelter in the Chengde Summer Palace, for their immediate execution.

In 1862, Loch married Elizabeth Villiers, whose twin sister was Edith Villiers. There is a tale that Henry proposed to the wrong girl by mistake and then refused to admit it. He and Elizabeth had two daughters and a son.

== Colonial administrator ==
Loch never entirely recovered his health after this experience in a Chinese dungeon. Returning home, he was invested as a Companion of the Order of the Bath, and for a while was private secretary to Sir George Grey, 2nd Baronet, then at the Home Office. In 1863 he was appointed Lieutenant Governor of the Isle of Man. During his governorship the House of Keys was transformed into an elective assembly, the first railway line was opened, and the influx of tourists began to bring fresh prosperity to the island. In 1882 Loch, who had become Knight Commander of the Bath in 1880, accepted a commissionership of woods and forests, and two years later was made governor of the colony of Victoria in Australia. In June 1889 he succeeded Sir Hercules Robinson as Governor of Cape Colony and High Commissioner for Southern Africa.

As High Commissioner his duties called for the exercise of great judgment and firmness. The Boers were at the same time striving to frustrate Cecil Rhodes's schemes of northern expansion and planning to occupy Mashonaland, to secure control of Swaziland and Zululand and to acquire the adjacent lands up to the ocean. Loch firmly supported Rhodes, and, by informing President Paul Kruger that troops would be sent to prevent any invasion of territory under British protection, he effectually crushed the Banyailand trek across the Limpopo River (1890–1891). Loch, however, with the approval of the imperial government, concluded in July–August 1890 a convention with President Kruger respecting Swaziland, by which, while the Boers withdrew all claims to territory north of the Transvaal, they were granted an outlet to the sea at Kosi Bay on condition that the republic entered the South African Customs Union. This convention was concluded after negotiations conducted with President Kruger by Jan Hendrik Hofmeyr on behalf of the high commissioner, and was made at a time when the British and Bond parties in Cape Colony were working in harmony.

The Transvaal did not fulfil the necessary conditions, and in view of an increasingly hostile attitude from Pretoria administration Loch became a strong advocate of annexation of the territory east of Swaziland, through which the Boer railway would have to pass to the sea. At length he induced the British government to adopt his view; and on 15 March 1895 it was announced that these territories (Amatongaland, etc.), would be annexed by Britain, an announcement received by Kruger "with the greatest astonishment and regret".

Meanwhile, Loch had been forced to intervene in another matter. When the commandeering difficulty of 1894 had roused the Uitlanders in the Transvaal to a dangerous pitch of excitement, he travelled to Pretoria to use his personal influence with President Kruger, and obtained the withdrawal of the obnoxious commandeering regulations. In the following year he entered a strong protest against the new Transvaal franchise law. Nonetheless the general situation in South Africa was assuming year by year a more threatening aspect. Cecil Rhodes, then prime minister of Cape Colony, was strongly in favor of a more energetic policy than was supported by the Imperial government. At the end of March 1895 the high commissioner, finding himself, it is believed, out of touch with his ministers, returned home embarrassed, a few months before the expiry of his term of office. In the same year he was raised to the peerage as Baron Loch, of Drylaw in the County of Midlothian.

When the Second Boer War broke out in 1899 Loch took a leading part in raising and equipping a body of mounted men, named after him Loch's Horse. He died in London on 20 June 1900, and was succeeded as Baron Loch by his son Edward Douglas Loch (1873–1942).

== Legacy ==
Loch, Victoria, Australia is named after the 1st Baron Loch.

A portion of Douglas Promenade is named Loch Promenade in memory of Governor Loch. In addition the Isle of Man Railway locomotive No.4 Loch is named in his honour. Loch Street in the Canberra suburb of Yarralumla is named after him due to Governorship of Victoria.

== Notes ==
Government offices
Preceded by Mark Hildesley Quayle (acting)	Lieutenant Governor of the Isle of Man; 1863–1882	Succeeded by Spencer Walpole
Preceded by The Marquess of Normanby	Governor of Victoria; 1884–1889	Succeeded by The Earl of Hopetoun
Preceded by Sir Hercules Robinson	Governor of Cape Colony; 1889–1895	Succeeded by Sir Hercules Robinson
Peerage of the United Kingdom
New creation	Baron Loch; 1895–1900	Succeeded by Edward Loch
