= Hanway Cumming =

British Army general

Colonel-Commandant Hanway Cumming DSO
- Born: 9 October 1867
- Died: 5 March 1921 (aged 53); Clonbanin, Ireland
- Military career
- Allegiance: United Kingdom
- Branch: British Army
- Service years: 1889–1921
- Rank: Colonel-Commandant
- Unit: Durham Light Infantry
- Commands: 110th Brigade (1918–19); Machine Gun Training School, Grantham (1917–1918); 91st Brigade (1916–1917); 2nd Battalion Durham Light Infantry (1916)
- Conflicts: Second Boer War; First World War; Irish War of Independence
- Awards: Distinguished Service Order; Mentioned in Despatches (4); Officer of the Legion of Honour (France)

Colonel-Commandant Hanway Robert Cumming, DSO (9 October 1867 – 5 March 1921) was an officer in the British Army.

Cumming fought in the Second Boer War, and in France during the First World War.

On 16 March 1918 he succeeded Douglas Edward Cayley in command of the 37th Division's 110th Infantry Brigade and was granted the temporary rank of brigadier general whilst so employed. He was in command until after the Armistice with Germany on 11 November. He was awarded the Distinguished Service Order in the 1917 Birthday Honours and appointed an Officer in the French Legion of Honour.

During the Irish War of Independence, Cumming, promoted on 1 January 1919 to brevet colonel, was placed on half-pay on 29 April 1919 after relinquishing command of the 110th Brigade and became commander of British troops in County Kerry. He was killed, aged 53, at the Clonbanin Ambush, and was possibly the highest-ranking British officer to be killed in that war.

His body was cremated in England at Golders Green Crematorium.
