= Spencer Loch, 4th Baron Loch =

British peer (1920-1991)

Spencer Douglas Loch, 4th Baron Loch (12 August 1920 – 24 June 1991) was a British soldier, barrister, peer, and baronet, a member of the House of Lords from 1982 until his death.

== Early life ==
The younger son of Edward Loch, 2nd Baron Loch, the young Loch was educated at Wellington College and Trinity College, Cambridge. In 1938, he gained a Royal Aero Club Aviator's Certificate.

== Career ==
Loch was commissioned into the Grenadier Guards in 1940 and served through the Second World War, reaching the rank of Major by 1946. He was called to the Bar from Lincoln's Inn in 1948 and was a member of the Cavalry and Guards Club and the Beefsteak Club. In 1982 he succeeded his brother George Henry Compton Loch (1916–1982) as Baron Loch.

== Personal life ==
On 1 April 1948, Loch married firstly Rachel Cooper, the daughter of Lieutenant-Colonel Howard Lister Cooper and Nan Ino Cooper, 10th Baroness Lucas. They had three children, Sara Nan (1949), Edward Granville (1951–1979) and Andrew Spencer (1955–1982). His wife died in 1976. In 1979, he married secondly Davila Boughley.

Loch lived at Bratton House near Westbury, Wiltshire, and Lochluichart in Ross-shire. Both his sons died before him, and when he died in 1991 he had no male heir and the peerage and baronetcy became extinct.
