= Guy Bainbridge =

British Army general (1867–1943)

Major-General Sir Guy Bainbridge KCB
- Born: 11 November 1867; Charlton, Kent, England
- Died: 27 September 1943 (aged 75); Leigh, Newtown, Hampshire, England
- Spouse: Alice May Goldie (m. 1904)
- Military career
- Allegiance: United Kingdom
- Branch: British Army
- Service years: 1888–1923
- Rank: Major-General
- Commands: 1st Division; 25th Division; 110th (Leicester) Infantry Brigade; School of Mounted Infantry; 7th Mounted Infantry
- Conflicts: Mahdist War; Second Boer War; First World War
- Awards: Knight Commander of the Order of the Bath; Mentioned in Despatches (10); Order of the Medjidie, 3rd Class (Ottoman Empire); Commander of the Legion of Honour (France); Croix de Guerre (France)

Major-General Sir Edmund Guy Tulloch Bainbridge, KCB (11 November 1867 – 27 September 1943) was a British Army officer who commanded the 25th Division during the First World War.

== Early life and education ==
Bainbridge was eldest son of late Colonel Sir Edmond Bainbridge of the Royal Artillery, and Louisa Tulloch, niece of Major General Sir Alexander Murray Tulloch. He was educated at Marlborough College and the Royal Military College, Sandhurst.

== Early military career ==
After passing out from Sandhurst, Bainbridge was commissioned as a second lieutenant into the East Kent Regiment (The Buffs) (later the Buffs (Royal East Kent Regiment)), on 11 February 1888 and took part in the Dongola Expedition in 1896 and the Nile Expedition of 1897, the same year he was made a captain in July, and fought at the Battle of Omdurman in 1898.

== Second Boer War ==
He served in South Africa during the Second Boer War, which began in October 1899, and took part in the Battle of Paardeberg (February 1900). In April 1900 he was appointed in command of the 7th Corps of Mounted Infantry, part of the 1st Mounted Infantry Brigade, under the overall command of Major General Edward Hutton. This brigade was part of a force taking part in Lord Roberts's advance from Bloemfontein and after the fall of Pretoria, and took part in the Battle of Diamond Hill (June 1900).

== Inter-war years ==
In 1903 he took command of the School of Mounted Infantry at Kilworth. He was promoted to major in August 1906.

In May 1910 he was appointed as a general staff officer, grade 2, (GSO2). Advanced to colonel in March 1912 he was at the same time made a general staff officer, grade 1, (GSO1).

== First World War ==
He was promoted to temporary brigadier general, just as World War I was starting, in August 1914.

In April 1915 he was commander of the 110th (Leicester) Infantry Brigade and, from June 1916, when he was advanced to temporary major general, as general officer commanding (GOC) of the Kitchener's Army 25th Division, taking over from Major General Beauchamp Doran. The division went on to fight at the Battle of the Somme later that year, at the Battle of Messines, and at the Battle of Passchendaele. Bainbridge was made a Companion of the Order of the Bath (CB) in January 1918 "for valuable services rendered in connection with Military Operations in the Field" and continued to lead his 25th Division in the German spring offensives of March/April 1918 and later at the Third Battle of the Aisne.

He relinquished command of the division, which he had now commanded for just over two years, in August when he was appinted inspector of infantry in Britain.

== Post-war years ==
After the war Bainbridge, promoted to major general in January 1917, became GOC 1st Division before retiring from the army in June 1923.

Military offices
Preceded by Peter Strickland	General Officer Commanding 1st Division; 1919–1923	Succeeded by Archibald Montgomery
