= Baron Loch =

Extinct barony in the Peerage of the United Kingdom

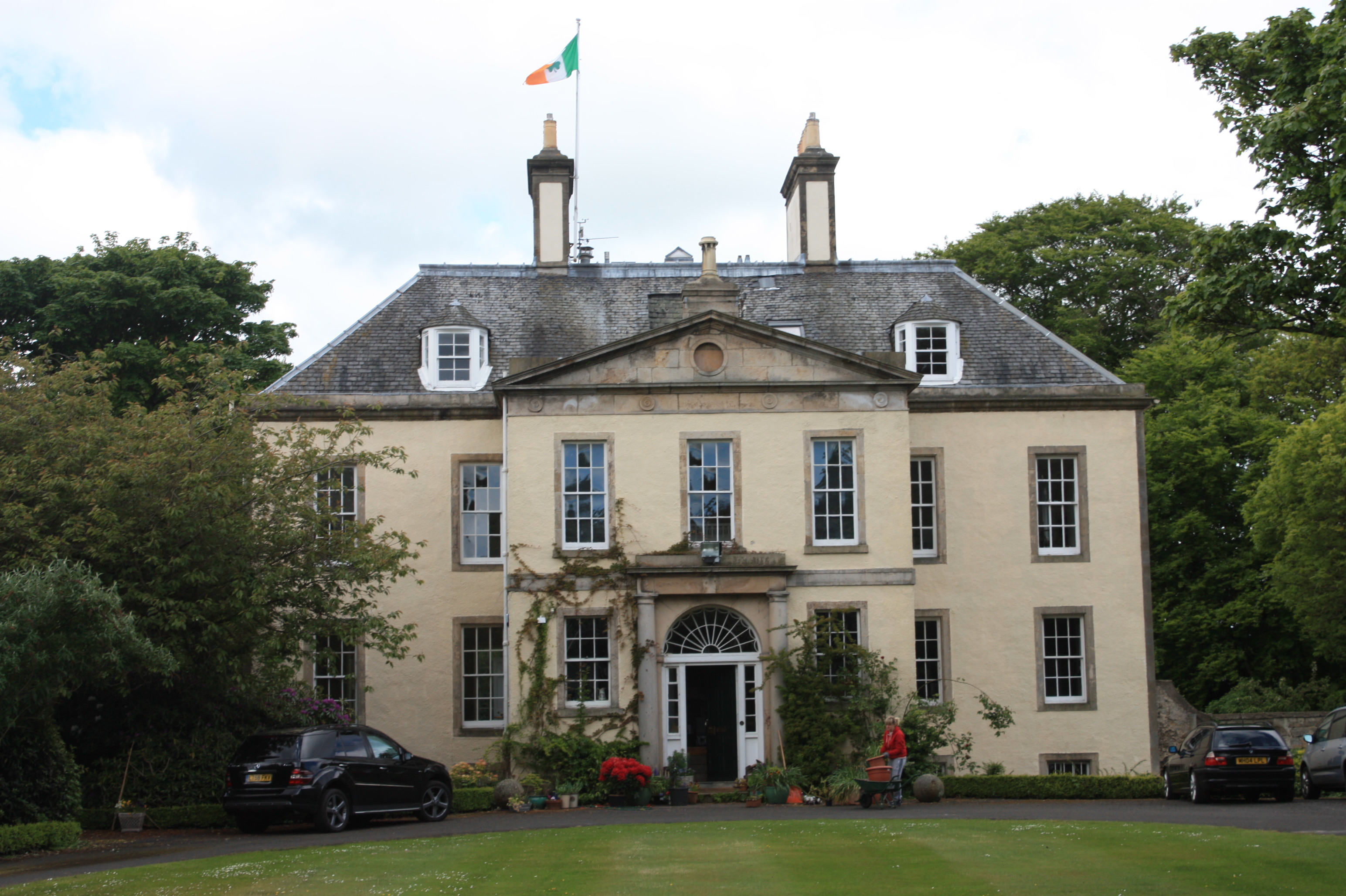
Drylaw House, Edinburgh

Baron Loch, of Drylaw in the County of Midlothian (now part of Edinburgh), was a title in the Peerage of the United Kingdom. It was created in 1895 for the soldier and colonial administrator Sir Henry Loch. He was the son of James Loch, Member of Parliament for Wick Burghs. Lord Loch was succeeded by his son, the second Baron. He was a Major-General in the British Army and also held political office as Captain of the Yeomen of the Guard in 1924 and between 1929 and 1931. His two sons, the third and fourth Barons, both succeeded to the title. George Henry, 3rd Baron Loch, served in the 11th Hussars and left the army as a major. After his fourth marriage to Sylvia (née Cameron), he was best known as an international riding instructor. The barony became extinct on the death of his brother Spencer in 1991.

== Barons Loch (1895) ==
- Henry Brougham Loch, 1st Baron Loch (1827–1900)
- Edward Douglas Loch, 2nd Baron Loch (1873–1942)
- George Henry Compton Loch, 3rd Baron Loch (1916–1982)
- Spencer Douglas Loch, 4th Baron Loch (1920–1991)
