= 76th Brigade (United Kingdom) =

Military unit

The 76th Brigade was an infantry brigade formation of the British Army. It was raised during World War I as part of Lord Kitchener's New Armies and was assigned to the 25th Division, and was sent, with the rest of the division, to the Western Front in September 1915, remaining there for the rest of the war. In mid-October 1915 the brigade was exchanged for the 7th Brigade and joined the 3rd Division.

== Order of battle ==
The 76th Brigade was composed as follows during the war:

- 8th (Service) Battalion, King's Own Royal Regiment (Lancaster)
- 10th (Service) Battalion, Royal Welch Fusiliers (left February 1918)
- 7th (Service) Battalion, King's Shropshire Light Infantry (left October 1915)
- 13th (Service) Battalion, King's Regiment (Liverpool) (left October 1915)
- 1st Battalion, Gordon Highlanders (from October 1915)
- 2nd Battalion, Suffolk Regiment (from October 1915)
- 76th Machine Gun Company, Machine Gun Corps (formed 13 April 1916, moved to 3rd Battalion, Machine Gun Corps 6 March 1918)
- 76th Trench Mortar Battery (joined 1 April 1916 as 43rd Trench Mortar Battery but immediately renamed)
