= Clonbanin ambush =

1921 IRA ambush against the British Army

- Part of the Irish War of Independence
Date	5 March 1921
Location	Clonbanin, County Cork 52.128°N 9.009°W
Result	IRA victory

Belligerents
Irish Republican Army	United Kingdom

Commanders and leaders
Seán Moylan; Paddy O'Brien; Tom McEllistrim	(United Kingdom of Great Britain and Ireland) Hanway Robert Cumming †

Strength
Almost 100 volunteers 1 machine gun	Almost 40 soldiers 1 armoured car

Casualties and losses
None	4 dead, 1 wounded
- Location within island of Ireland

The Clonbanin ambush was an ambush carried out by the Irish Republican Army (IRA) on 5 March 1921, during the Irish War of Independence. It took place in the townland of Clonbanin (a.k.a. Cloonbannin), County Cork.

The IRA force was under the command of Sean Moylan and comprised almost 100 volunteers from counties Cork and Kerry, armed with rifles, hand grenades and a machine gun. Their target was a British Army convoy of three lorries, an armoured car and a touring car carrying Colonel Commandant Hanway Robert Cumming. The convoy was travelling from Killarney to Buttevant and comprised almost 40 soldiers of the East Lancashire Regiment.

When the convoy entered the ambush position, IRA volunteers opened fire from elevated positions on both sides of the road. The three lorries and the touring car were disabled, and the armoured car became stuck in the roadside ditch (although those inside fired from its machine guns). As Cumming jumped from his car, he was shot in the head and died instantly. Two Officers and two soldiers were killed and one policeman was wounded.

The battle lasted slightly over an hour. As the IRA forces withdrew from one side of the road, a British officer and six soldiers attempted to flank the IRA on the other side. After a brief exchange of fire they retreated.

The IRA is not believed to have sustained any casualties.
