= 25th Division (United Kingdom) =

Infantry division of the British Army

- Divisional sign
- Active: September 1914–1919
- Country: United Kingdom
- Branch: British Army
- Type: Infantry
- Size: Division
- Engagements: First World War

Commanders
- Notable commanders: Sir Ronald Charles

Insignia
- Divisional vehicle sign

The 25th Division was an infantry division of the British Army, raised as part of Lord Kitchener's Third New Army (K3) in September 1914, shortly after the outbreak of the Great War. It served on the Western Front for most of the war.

== Unit history ==
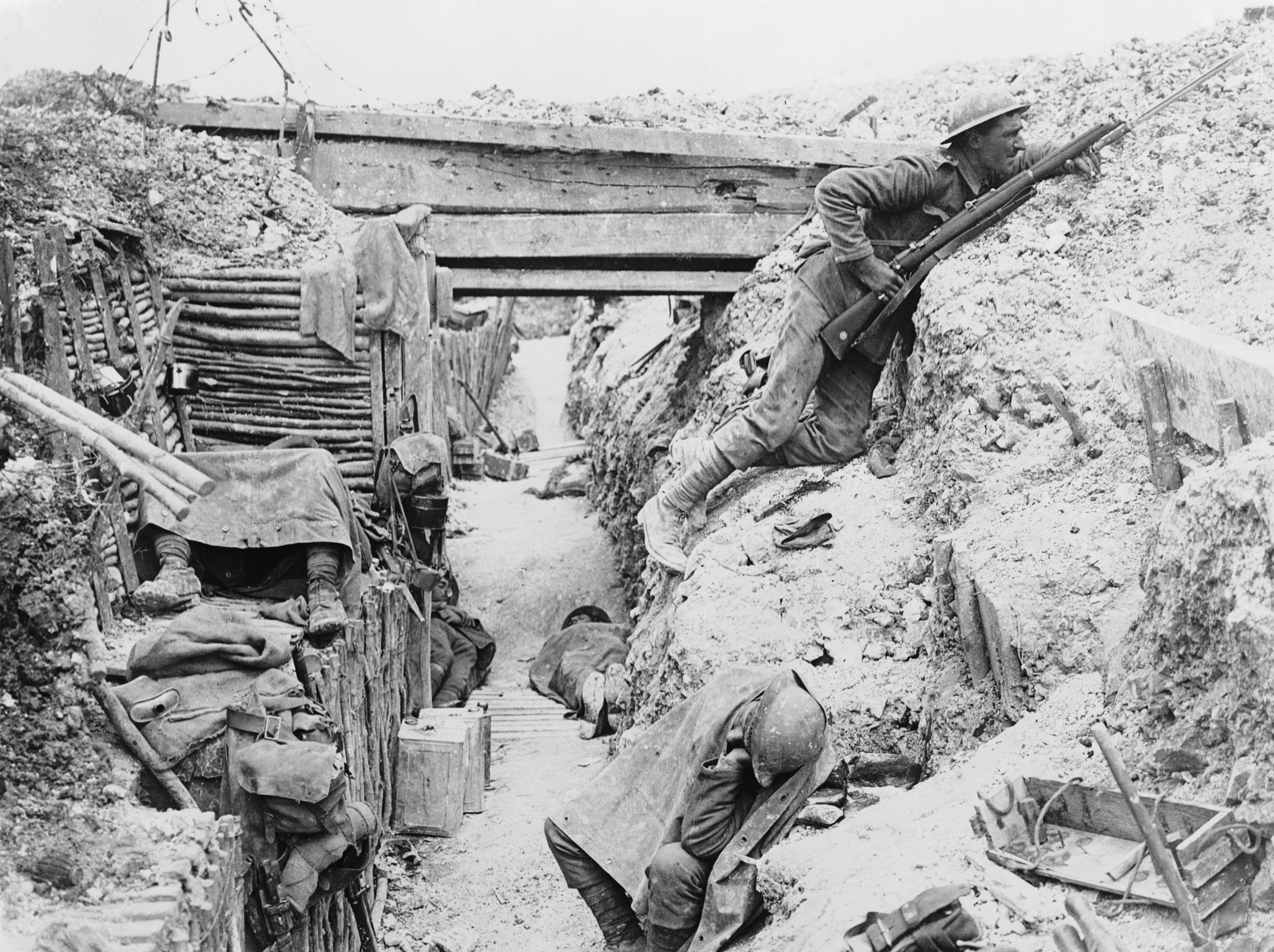
A German trench occupied by British soldiers near the Albert-Bapaume road at Ovillers-la-Boisselle, July 1916 during the Battle of the Somme. The men are from 'A' Company, 11th (Service) Battalion, Cheshire Regiment.

The component units of the division were assembled around Salisbury and moved to Aldershot, Hampshire, in May 1915 to complete their training. The division was formed by Major-General Francis Ventris and crossed to France from 25 to 30 September under the command of Major-General Beauchamp Doran, a former infantry brigade commander in the British Expeditionary Force in the early days of the war. The division comprised the 74th, 75th and 76th infantry brigades but the 76th Brigade was posted away on 15 October 1915 and replaced by the 7th Infantry Brigade from the 3rd Division, one of the original “Regular” divisions of the BEF.

In June 1916 Major-General Guy Bainbridge took command and the division went on to fight at the Battle of the Somme, at the Battle of Messines, at the Battle of Passchendaele, in the German spring offensive of March–April 1918 and at the Third Battle of the Aisne.

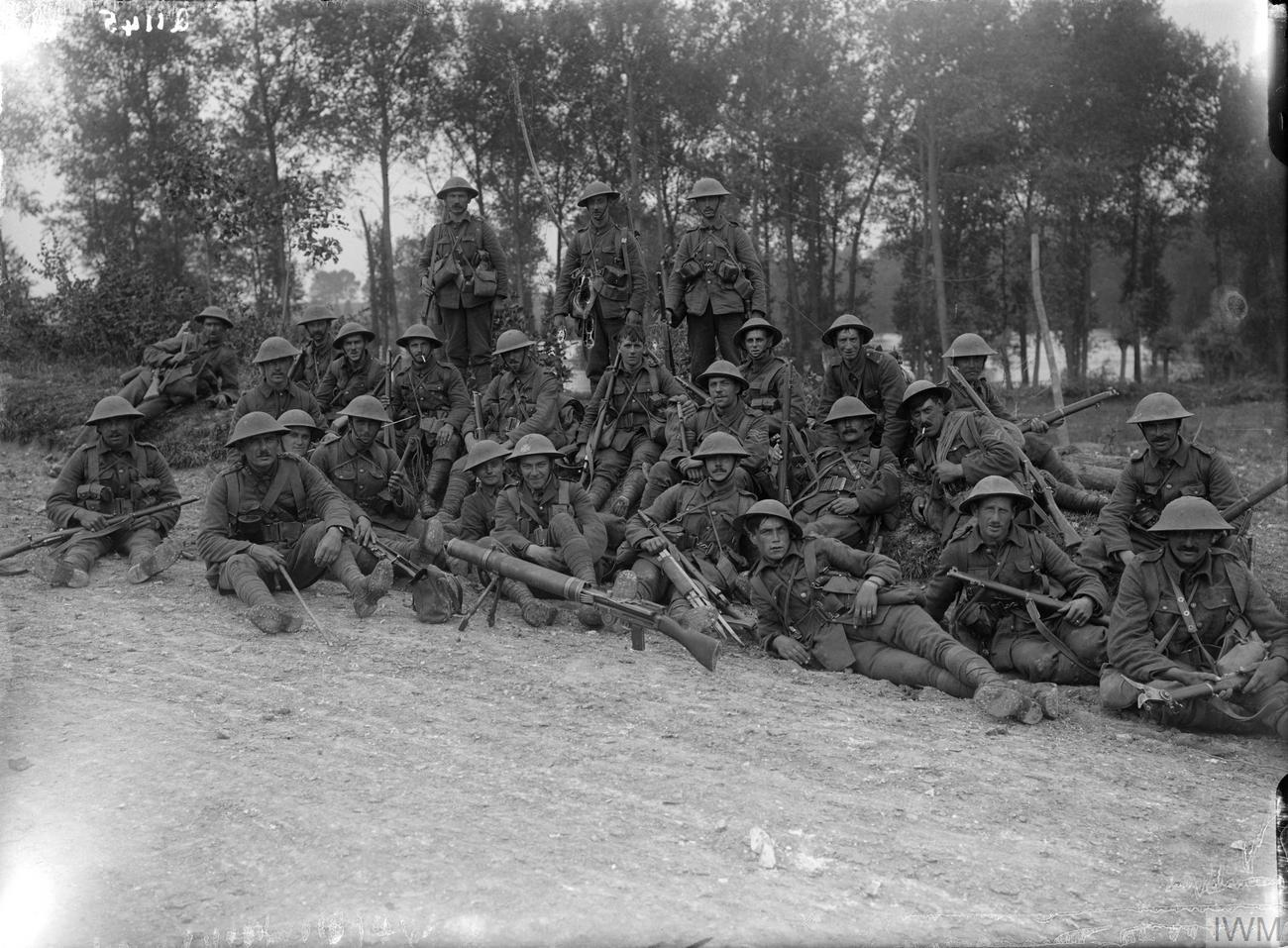
Officers and men of the 1st Battalion, Wiltshire Regiment, after their return from the fighting at Thiepval, photographed at Bouzincourt, France, September 1916.

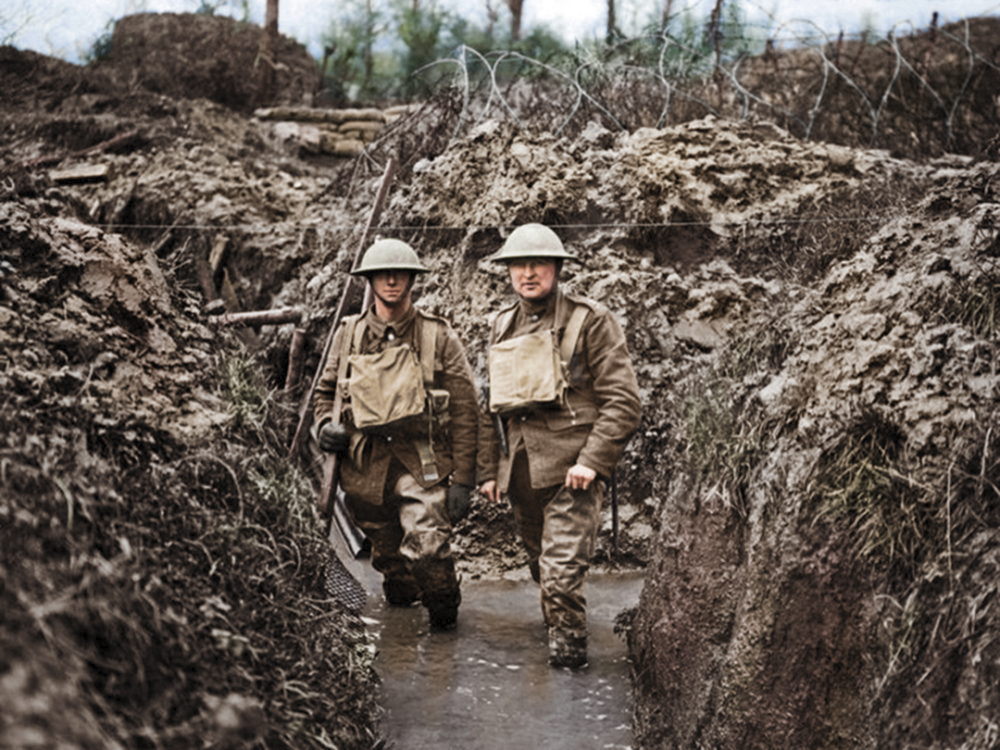
An unidentified sergeant and Warrant Officer Henry Basil Ault, the company quartermaster sergeant (CQMS) of the 11th (Service) Battalion, Lancashire Fusiliers, in a flooded communication trench opposite Messines, near Ploegsteert Wood, January 1917.

The 25th Division was unlucky during the 1918 German offensives, being attacked three times (sharing its misfortune with the 19th (Western) Division, the 21st Division and the 50th (Northumbrian) Division). It was on the northern flank defences during Operation Michael in March 1918 and was moved north to refit. There it lost more men in the Battle of the Lys in April. Moved south to another quiet area, it was attacked for a third time in the Third Battle of the Aisne.

After suffering severe casualties in June 1918, the division underwent a refit and reorganisation, receiving infantry from divisions then serving in Italy. The reformed division moving back to France in September 1918. The division played a major role in the final few weeks of the war its most noted success was the capture of the village of Beaurevoir on 5–6 October 1918. The war finally came to an end over a month later with the signing of the armistice of 11 November 1918.

The 25th Division was demobilised by the end of March 1919, having suffered 48,300 casualties during its service overseas in the First World War.

== General officers commanding ==
GOC
Rank	Name	Dates
Major-General	Francis Ventris	18 September 1914 – 27 May 1915
Major-General	Beauchamp Doran	27 May 1915 – 4 June 1916
Major-General	Guy Bainbridge	4 June 1916 – 4 August 1918
Major-General	Ronald Charles	4 August 1918 – March 1919

== Order of battle ==
The following units served in the division.

74th Brigade

- 11th (Service) Battalion, Lancashire Fusiliers (disbanded August 1918)
- 13th (Service) Battalion, Cheshire Regiment (disbanded August 1918)
- 8th (Service) Battalion, East Lancashire Regiment (left November 1914)
- 8th (Service) Battalion, Loyal North Lancashire Regiment (left October 1915)
- 9th (Service) Battalion, Loyal North Lancashire Regiment (left June 1918)
- 2nd Battalion, Royal Irish Rifles (joined October 1915, left November 1917)
- 3rd Battalion, Worcestershire Regiment (joined November 1917, left June 1918)
- 74th Machine Gun Company (joined March 1916, left to move into 25th MG battalion March 1918)
- 74th Trench Mortar Battery (formed June 1917)

During reconstruction in mid 1918

- 2/7th Battalion, Lancashire Fusiliers (joined June 1918, disbanded July 1918)
- 21st (Service) Battalion, Middlesex Regiment (Islington) (joined and left June 1918)
- 9th (Service) Battalion, Alexandra, Princess of Wales's Own (Yorkshire Regiment) (joined September 1918)
- 11th (Service) Battalion, Sherwood Foresters (Nottinghamshire and Derbyshire Regiment) (joined September 1918)
- 13th (Service) Battalion, Durham Light Infantry (Pioneers) (joined September 1918)

(the last three battalions joined from the brigades of 23rd Division serving in Italy)

- 74th Trench Mortar Battery

75th Brigade

- 10th (Service) Battalion, Cheshire Regiment (left October 1915)
- 11th (Service) Battalion, Cheshire Regiment (left June 1918)
- 8th (Service) Battalion, Border Regiment (left June 1918)
- 8th (Service) Battalion, Prince of Wales's Volunteers (South Lancashire Regiment) (disbanded February 1918)
- 2nd Battalion, Prince of Wales's Volunteers (South Lancashire Regiment) (joined October 1915, left June 1918)
- 75th Machine Gun Company (joined on 15 March 1916, moved into 25 MG Battalion March 1918)
- 75th Trench Mortar Battery (formed June 1916)

During reconstruction in mid 1918

- 1/6th Battalion, Cheshire Regiment (joined May 1918, left July 1918)
- 17th (Service) Battalion, King's (Liverpool Regiment) (1st City) (joined June 1918)
- 11th (Service) Battalion, Royal Sussex Regiment (joined June 1918)
- 6th (Service) Battalion, Alexandra, Princess of Wales's Own (Yorkshire Regiment) (joined June 1918)
- 13th (Service) Battalion, Alexandra, Princess of Wales's Own (Yorkshire Regiment) (joined June 1918)

(On 9 September 1918, the Brigade was renumbered as 236th Brigade and was placed under orders for service in North Russia. It left the 25th Division at this point.)

A new 75th Brigade was formed in September 1918

- 1/5th Battalion, Gloucestershire Regiment
- 1/8th Battalion, Royal Warwickshire Regiment
- 1/8th Battalion, Worcestershire Regiment

(these battalions joined from the brigades of 48th (South Midland) Division serving in Italy)

- 75th Trench Mortar Battery

76th Brigade

(left to join 3rd Division on 15 October 1915)

- 8th (Service) Battalion, King's Own (Royal Lancaster Regiment)
- 10th (Service) Battalion, Royal Welsh Fusiliers
- 6th (Service) Battalion, South Wales Borderers (left February 1915)
- 10th (Service) Battalion, Welsh Regiment (joined and left in September 1914)
- 7th (Service) Battalion, King's (Shropshire Light Infantry)
- 13th (Service) Battalion, King's (Liverpool Regiment) (joined February 1915)

7th Brigade

(joined from 3rd Division in exchange for the 76th Brigade on 18 October 1915)

- 10th (Service) Battalion, Cheshire Regiment (left as a cadre July 1918)
- 3rd Battalion, Worcestershire Regiment (left November 1917)
- 2nd Battalion, Prince of Wales's Volunteers (South Lancashire Regiment) (left to join 75th Brigade a week after Brigade joined Division)
- 8th (Service) Battalion, Loyal North Lancashire Regiment (disbanded February 1918)
- 1st Battalion, Duke of Edinburgh's (Wiltshire Regiment) (left June 1918)
- 2nd Battalion, Royal Irish Rifles (left to join the 74th Brigade a week after the brigade joined the division)
- 4th (Extra Reserve) Battalion, South Staffordshire Regiment (joined October 1917, left June 1918)
- 7th Machine Gun Company (joined January 1916, moved into 25 MG battalion March 1918)
- 7th Trench Mortar Battery (formed July 1916)

During reconstruction in mid 1918

- 13th (Service) Battalion, East Surrey Regiment (Wandsworth) (joined June 1918, disbanded November 1918)
- 9th (Service) Battalion, Devonshire Regiment (joined September 1918)
- 20th (Service) Battalion, Manchester Regiment (5th City) (joined September 1918)
- 21st (Service) Battalion, Manchester Regiment (6th City) (joined September 1918)

(except for the 13th East Surreys, which joined from the 39th Division, these battalions joined from the brigades of 7th Division serving in Italy)

- 7th Trench Mortar Battery

Pioneers

- 13th (Service) Battalion, Manchester Regiment (joined September 1914, left October 1914)
- 13th (Service) Battalion, King's (Liverpool Regiment) (joined October 1914, left February 1915)
- 8th (Service) Battalion, East Lancashire Regiment (joined November 1914, left March 1915)
- 6th (Service) Battalion, South Wales Borderers (joined as Divisional pioneer battalion February 1915, left June 1918)
- 8th (Service) Battalion, Leicestershire Regiment (joined as a cadre June 1918)
- 11th (Service) Battalion, Prince of Wales's Volunteers (South Lancashire Regiment) (joined as a cadre June 1918, became Divisional pioneer battalion October 1918)

Machine Gunners

- 195th Machine Gun Company (joined December 1916 moved into 25 MG Bn March 1918)
- 25th Battalion, Machine Gun Corps (created March 1918, left July 1918, rejoined October 1918)
- 100th (Warwickshire and South Nottinghamshire Yeomanry) Battalion, Machine Gun Corps (joined October 1918, left October 1918)

Divisional artillery

The divisional artillery remained in France when the rest of the division returned to England to re-fit in June 1918. It took part in the Second Battle of Bapaume, the Battle of Epehy and the Battle of the Saint-Quentin Canal, then rejoined the 25th Division on 4 October 1918.

- CX Brigade, RFA (between 26 May and 4 June 1918, attached to 8th Division)
- CXI Brigade, RFA (broken up 27 November 1916)
- CXII Brigade, RFA (between 26 May and 21 June 1918, attached to 21st Division)
- CXIII (Howitzer) Brigade, RFA (left 14 February 1917)
- 25th Heavy Battery, RGA (raised with the Division but moved independently to France)
- W.25 Heavy Trench Mortar Battery RFA (joined July 1916, broken up March 1918)
- X.25 Medium Mortar Battery (joined April 1916)
- Y.25 Medium Mortar Battery (joined April 1916)
- Z.25 Medium Mortar Battery (joined April 1916, broken up in March 1918, distributed to X.25 and Y.25 batteries)

Royal Engineers

- 93rd, 94th Field Companies (left February 1915)
- 106th Field Company (joined January 1915)
- 105th Field Company (joined February 1915)
- 130th Field Company (joined May 1915)

Royal Army Medical Corps

- 75th, 76th, 77th Field Ambulance
- 42nd Sanitary Section (left 18 April 1917)

Division Troops

- Regimental HQ and B Squadron, Lothians and Border Horse (joined summer 1915, left May 1916)
- 25th Divisional Ammunition Column
- 25th Divisional Signals Company
- 25th Divisional Train
  - 198th–201st Companies ASC
- 37th Mobile Veterinary Section AVC
- 225th Divisional Employment Company (joined 21 May 1917)

== See also ==
- List of British divisions in World War I

== Bibliography ==
- Maj A.F. Becke,History of the Great War: Order of Battle of Divisions, Part 3b: New Army Divisions (30–41) and 63rd (R.N.) Division, London: HM Stationery Office, 1939/Uckfield: Naval & Military Press, 2007, ISBN 1-847347-41-X.
- Becke, Archibald F. (1938). Order of Battle of Divisions Part 3A. New Army Divisions (9–26). London: HMSO. OCLC 4405016.
- Chappell, Mike (1986). British Battle Insignia (1). 1914–18. Oxford: Osprey. ISBN 978-0-85045-727-8 – via Archive Foundation.
- Kincaid-Smith, M. (2001) [1920]. The 25th Division in France and Flanders (N & M Press, Uckfield ed.). London: Harrison & Son. ISBN 1-84342-123-2. Archived from the original on 20 December 2019.
- Order of Battle of the British Armies in France, November 11th, 1918. France: General Staff, GHQ. 1918.
