= Capture of Gueudecourt =

- Part of the Battle of the Somme, First World War
- Battle of the Somme 1 July – 18 November 1916
| Date | 25–26 September 1916 |
| Location | Picardy, France 50°03′34″N 02°50′36″E |
| Result | British victory |

Belligerents
| British Empire | Germany |

Commanders and leaders
| Douglas Haig | Crown Prince Rupprecht |

Strength
| 1 division | 2 regiments |

Casualties and losses
| Part of 4,152; (16 September – 1 October) | Incomplete; 370 prisoners |
- Gueudecourt is a commune in the Pas-de-Calais department in the Nord-Pas-de-Calais region of France

The Capture of Gueudecourt (25–26 September 1916) is a tactical incident of the First World War during the Battle of the Somme. The village of Gueudecourt lies on the Le Sars–Le Transloy road, north-east of Flers and north-west of Lesbœufs. Behind Gueudecourt lay open country which had hardly been shelled with Le Barque in the middle distance and then Bapaume beyond. German troops had passed through the village in late September 1914 during the First Battle of Albert, part of reciprocal attempts by the German and Franco-British armies to advance round the northern flank of their opponent, during the operations known as the Race to the Sea. The village became a backwater until 1916 when the Germans built a third defensive position behind the Somme front ready for the British–French offensive being prepared on the Somme.

During the Battle of Flers–Courcelette (15–22 September) the Germans were forced back from Flers and the survivors retired to (Gallwitz Riegel), a defensive position which ran in front of Gueudecourt. At the Battle of Morval (25–28 September), the first attack by the 21st Division on 25 September was stopped short of the village. Next day a combined operation by infantry, aircraft and a tank inflicted many casualties on the defenders and forced the survivors to surrender, after which the village was occupied and consolidated. To exploit the success, British cavalry went forward to probe the area around the village but were repulsed by machine-gun and artillery-fire from improvised German defences on Transloy Ridge.

At the Battle of Le Transloy (1–28 October) and in local operations in November, Gueudecourt was used as a jumping-off point. In the winter of 1916–1917 the area was held by the I Anzac Corps, which considered the conditions around the village to be the worst on the Somme front. Gueudecourt became a backwater until 1918, when the village was lost on 24 March during Operation Michael, the German spring offensive. The village was recaptured for the last time on 28 August, by the 17th (Northern) Division, during the Second Battle of Bapaume.

== Background ==
=== 1914 ===
On 25 September, during the Race to the Sea a French attack north of the Somme against the II Bavarian Corps (General Karl von Martini), forced a hurried withdrawal. As more Bavarian units arrived in the north, the 3rd Bavarian Division advanced along the north bank of the Somme, through Bouchavesnes, Leforest and Hardecourt until held up at Maricourt. The 4th Bavarian Division further to the north, defeated the French territorials and then attacked westwards in the vicinity of Gueudecourt, towards Albert, through Sailly, Combles, Guillemont and Montauban. The II Bavarian Corps and XIV Reserve Corps (Generalleutnant Hermann von Stein) pushed back a French Territorial division from the area around Bapaume and advanced towards Bray-sur-Somme and Albert, as part of an offensive down the Somme valley to reach the sea. The German offensive was confronted north of the Somme by the northern corps of the French Second Army east of Albert. The XIV Reserve Corps attacked on 28 September, along the Roman road from Bapaume to Albert and Amiens, intending to reach the Ancre and then continue westwards along the Somme valley. The 28th (Baden) Reserve Division advanced close to Fricourt, against scattered resistance from French infantry and cavalry.

=== 1916 ===
On 22 July, an air reconnaissance by 9 Squadron Royal Flying Corps (RFC) observed the German defences from Combles to Gueudecourt and reported that they were extensive but unoccupied. On 15 September, an RFC aircraft flew overhead as a tank drove from Flers to Gueudecourt, where the garrison had fled and then saw it hit and set on fire.

== Prelude ==
=== British plan ===
The British plan was for an advance to the final objective set for the attacks of 15–22 September, during the Battle of Flers–Courcelette. The ground to be taken was on the east side of Bazentin ridge, which ran north-west from the Somme to a hollow facing north-east with Combles at the west end. North of the hollow, lay Morval, Lesbœufs, Gueudecourt and the Albert–Bapaume road. Spurs ran down the eastern slope generally to the north-east, in the direction of the Péronne–Bapaume road, before the ground rose again from St Pierre Vaast Wood to Sailly-Saillisel, Le Transloy, Beaulencourt and Thilloy. An advance on the main front of the British attack of 1,200–1,500 yd (1,100–1,400 m), was to be made in three stages. The first stage was an advance to the third of the objective lines set for 15 September and to the Gird Trenches (Gallwitz Riegel) south of Gueudecourt, beginning at 12:35 p.m. The second objective was along a line along the sunken road from Combles to Gueudecourt to the west of Morval and Lesbœufs, then over a spur south-east of Gueudecourt and through the centre of the village, beginning at 1:35 p.m. The final objective was on the east side of Morval, Lesbœufs and Gueudecourt, the advance to begin at 2:35 p.m. with the objectives to be reached by 3:00 p.m.

Tanks were to be kept in reserve, ready to assist the attack on the villages at the final objective. The open ground on the approach to Gueudecourt was also considered to be too dangerous for tanks. Two brigades of the 1st Indian Cavalry Division were to move forward to Mametz, with all the division to be ready to advance on Thilloy and Ligny Thilloy, once Lesbœufs and Gueudecourt were captured. If the villages were taken before 6:30 p.m., small cavalry detachments attached to XIV and XV corps were to exploit local opportunities. The British conformed to the French preference for afternoon attacks, which meant that the final bombardment took place in daylight. The 21st Division (Major-General David Campbell), was to capture Gueudecourt by advancing to the first objective at the Gird Trenches and then reaching the second objective at the village and passing through to the final objective beyond. Morale in the 21st Division had declined and on 24 September, 150 men of the 10th King's Own Yorkshire Light Infantry (KOYLI) tried to report sick. The right flank of the division was to join with the Guards Division at a fork on the Gueudecourt–Le Transloy road.

=== German preparations ===
In early September, Crown Prince Rupprecht of Bavaria, commander of the German northern army group, found that frequent relief of troops opposite the British was essential and stripped the other armies of the army group of fresh divisions and units, moving the 85th Reserve Brigade and the 45th Reserve Division from the 4th Army in Flanders, into the area between Thiepval and Martinpuich. After the sacking of Erich von Falkenhayn, the Chief of the General Staff of Oberste Heeresleitung (OHL) on 29 August, his successors General Paul von Hindenburg and General Erich Ludendorff visited the Western Front, ordered an end to offensive operations at the Battle of Verdun and the reinforcement of the Somme front. Tactics were reviewed and a more "elastic" defence was advocated, to replace the defence of tactically unimportant ground and the routine counter-attacking of British and French advances. After the Battle of Flers–Courcelette, all of the divisions from Combles to Thiepval had to be relieved and the defences around Gueudecourt were taken over by the 6th Bavarian Division and the 52nd Reserve Division. Gird Trench and Gird Support Trench (Gallwitz Riegel), 500 yd (460 m) apart, had been dug by the Germans against an attack from the south-west. The Gird trenches ran north-west to south-east, behind the Butte de Warlencourt. Seven Dials and Factory Corner protected the village against attacks from Eaucourt l'Abbaye to the west. On the road north-west to Ligny–Thilloy, Luisenhof Farm had been fortified.

== Battle ==
=== 25 September ===
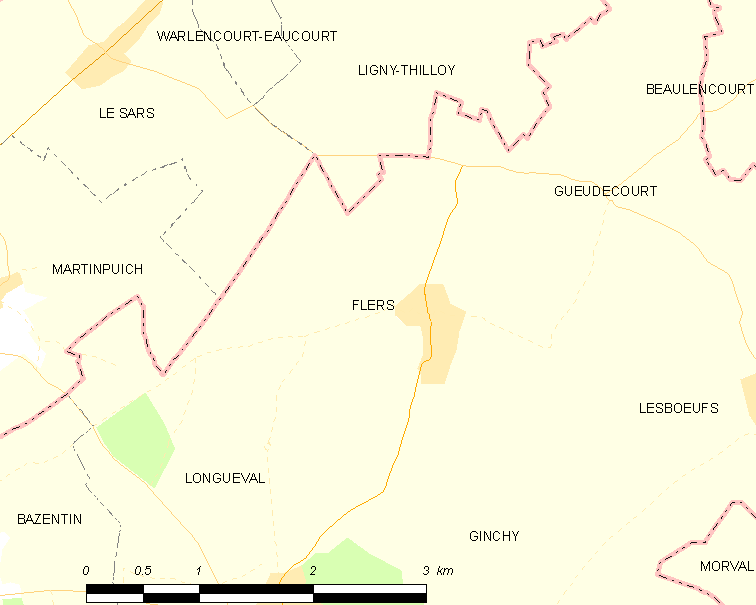
Map of the vicinity of Gueudecourt (commune FR insee code 80314)

The 21st Division attacked on the right flank of XV Corps, opposite the left of the 6th Bavarian Division and the right of the 52nd Reserve Division. The British attack had been expected on 23 September and at an earlier time; the delayed attack and later start achieved a measure of surprise. Two battalions of the 64th Brigade on the right were held up by uncut wire at Gird Trench (Gallwitz Riegel) and were engaged by machine-guns which fired c. 16,000 rounds, when they tried to cut the wire, leading most of the survivors to take cover in shell-holes until dark. The Germans had withdrawn many of their machine-guns from the front line, to protect them and engage the British from long range. The 1st Battalion, Lincoln Regiment (including the First Contingent of the Bermuda Volunteer Rifle Corps (BVRC) that had been attached to the battalion in June 1915, as two extra platoons), detached from the 62nd Brigade, was so badly shelled as it moved forward to attack the second objective, that it was stopped at the British front line. A company of the Lincolns advanced on the extreme right, in company with the 4th Grenadier Guards of the 3rd Guards Brigade and attacked the Gird Trench–Gas Alley junction; the attack failed but contact was maintained with the Guards.

Two battalions of the 110th Brigade, on the left of the division, were caught by a German counter-barrage but found a gap in the defences of Bavarian Infantry Regiment 13, attacked the II Battalion from the rear and took Goat Trench. As the barrage stopped, the advance to the second objective was resumed, through well-cut wire but machine-gun fire from the right caused many casualties and stopped the advance short of Gird Trench. The forward troops were reorganised and a runner sent back to call on the reserve companies was wounded en route and the message was not delivered. The 9th Leicester formed a defensive flank along a sunken part of "Watling Street" (the Ginchy–Gueudecourt road) on the right flank. A small number of troops of the 8th Leicester, who had got into Gird Trench held on and gained touch with the 165th Brigade of the 55th Division, which had taken Gird Trench in its area early in the afternoon. Disorganisation along the 21st Division front and the great number of casualties among message runners, prevented the divisional headquarters from realising the situation and erroneous reports from observers convinced the headquarters that Gueudecourt had fallen. The British then gained a foothold in a sunken road between Gird Trench and Gueudecourt at 2:40 p.m.

=== 26 September ===
The two tanks of XV Corps at Flers were intended to support the attack on Gird Trench to the south-west of the village but one was damaged by shellfire and the remaining tank went forward. About 1,500 yd (1,400 m) of the trench was still occupied by the Germans and the tank drove up Pilgrim's Way at 6:30 a.m., firing into Gird Trench, followed by bombers of the 7th Leicester and two infantry companies, which bombed the German defenders south-eastwards towards the Guards Division. German troops who ran back in the open were shot down and those who sheltered in bunkers were bombed out. An artillery-observation aircrew from 3 Squadron overhead, saw that the Germans had been forced into a 500 yd (460 m) length of the trench. The observer pinpointed the ends and sent a zone call, after which the trench was severely bombarded; after a few minutes the crew directed the artillery to cease fire and strafed the trench with machine-gun fire from 300 ft (91 m), after which 370 Germans, mainly from Reserve Infantry Regiment 238 of the 52nd Reserve Division, surrendered. The crew dropped a message to the infantry, who took the prisoners, having had five casualties. (Note: "Zones" were based on lettered squares of the army 1:40,000 map; each map square was divided into four sections 3,000 yd (1.7 mi; 2.7 km) square. The observer used a call sign of the map square letter then the zone letter to signal to the artillery. All guns and howitzers up to 6-inch able to bear on the target opened rapid fire, using corrections of aim from the air observer.) The 15th DLI advanced from the front of the 64th Brigade and occupied the Gird Trenches; after receiving reports from the Welsh Guards that they could walk in the open unmolested, the XV Corps headquarters ordered patrols into Gueudecourt. At 11:00 a.m. patrols of Cavalry Corps and the South Irish Horse, the corps cavalry regiment, reconnoitred higher ground to the north-east and north-west.

Around noon, a squadron of the 19th Lancers of the 1st Cavalry Division advanced from Mametz and Flers towards Gueudecourt, only to be engaged by artillery and machine-guns from the right flank. A patrol went eastwards round the village and was forced out by shellfire. The rest of the squadron dismounted and entered the village from the south-west at 2:15 p.m. as a troop of the South Irish Horse entered from the north-west and engaged German troops seen to the north and north-east with small-arms fire. Troops of the 110th Brigade had probed forward and the 6th Leicester entered the village at 4:30 p.m. I Battalion, Infantry Regiment 72 of the 8th Division was ordered to occupy Gueudecourt and advanced towards Luisenhof Farm. A German force thought to be about three battalions was seen to advance from Thilloy and take cover about 1 mi (1.6 km) north of the Gueudecourt and was thought to be a counter-attack; field artillery bombarded the area and no more movement was seen. The cavalry retired around 6:00 p.m. and the Leicester began to dig in around 7:00 p.m. on the eastern fringe of the village. The 64th Brigade had advanced with the 15th DLI, the 10th and part of the 9th KOYLI, met some troops who had refused to withdraw the day before and dug in by 5:30 p.m. short of the final objective of the Gueudecourt–Le Transloy road, after which the 12th Northumberland of the 62nd Brigade advanced and took over the new front line then moved forward to consolidate along the road, with the right flank at the Lesbœufs road junction in touch with the Guards Division and at 10:00 p.m. the 10th Green Howards took over on the left of the new line.

== Aftermath ==
=== Analysis ===
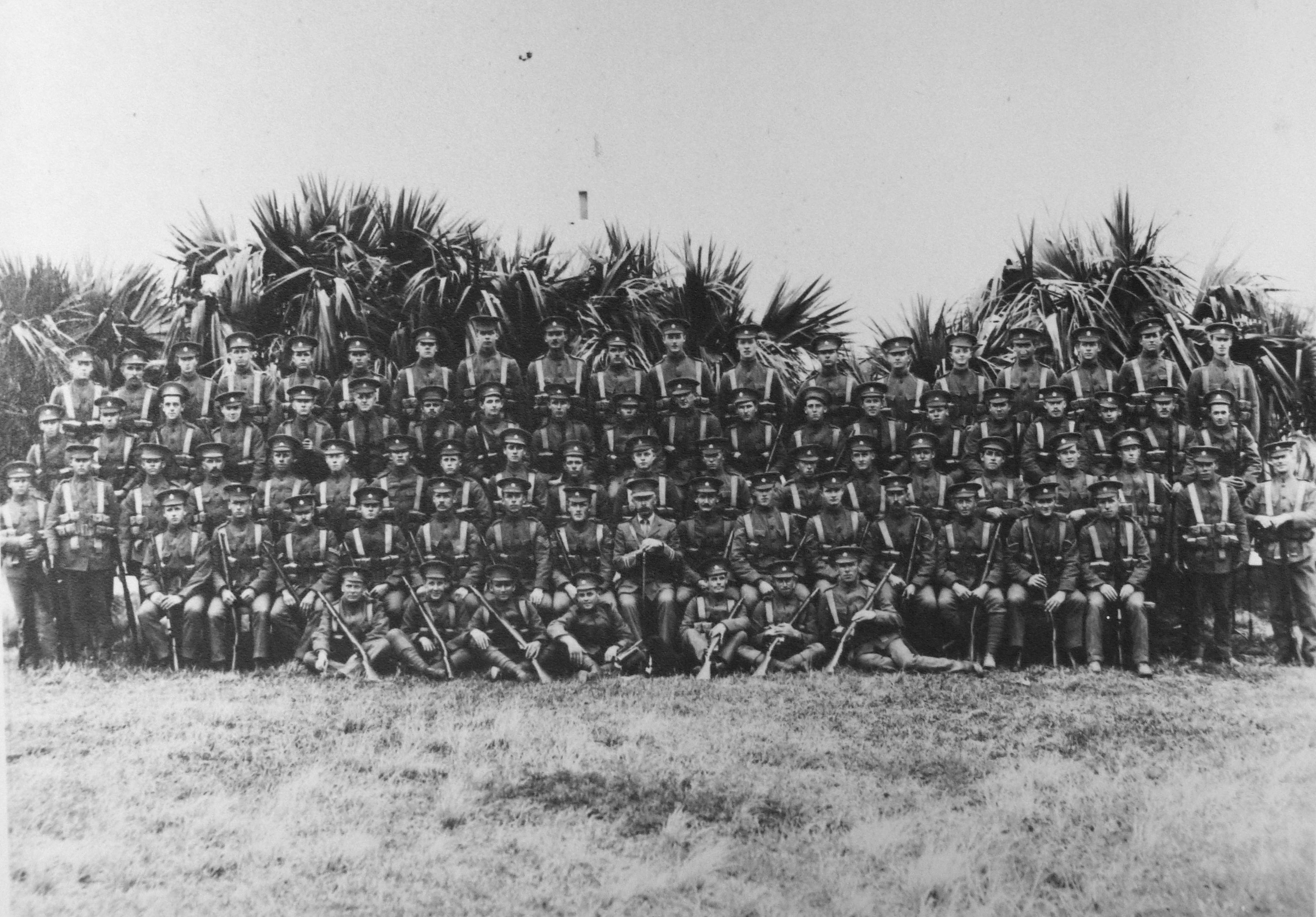
Bermuda Volunteer Rifle Corps First Contingent (1 officer and 88 other ranks) in Bermuda, winter 1914–1915, before joining 1st Battalion, the Lincolnshire Regiment in France in July, 1915. Fifty per cent of their remaining strength was lost at Guedecourt on 25 September 1916, leaving a dozen men who were merged with a newly-arrived Second Contingent. The two contingents suffered 75 per cent casualties by the end of the war

The cavalry patrols which moved past Gueudecourt to scout the ground towards Ligny Thilloy and Le Transloy had been forced to dismount but the German defence was in disorder, suggesting that an opportunity to exploit the situation with cavalry was close. The depth of advance and relatively light British casualties during the Battle of Morval was partly due to the improvement of the tactical methods in the Fourth Army, particularly in infantry–artillery co-operation. Prior and Wilson called the battle an "outstanding success", although they attributed this to accident more than design. The German defenders had been forced out of their prepared defences and had to fight in improvised positions but had still managed to withdraw all but two field guns. The Fourth Army divisions were so tired that they could do no more than advance to regain contact with the Germans.

=== Casualties ===
The 21st Division suffered 4,152 casualties from 16 September to 1 October and an unknown number of casualties were suffered by the two German divisions involved in the defence of the village. On 26 September, 370 Germans surrendered during the occupation of Gueudecourt.

=== Subsequent operations ===
After the Battle of Morval, the 21st Division was relieved by the 12th (Eastern) Division on the night of 1/2 October and in the Battle of Le Transloy, attempted to push forward to German trench lines in the shallow valley beyond Gueudecourt, which was overlooked by the higher ground of the Transloy ridges and the Butte de Warlencourt. The British attacks gained only a few hundred yards, despite set-piece attacks on 7, 12, 18 and 23 October and numerous local operations. The greatest distance advanced by the British during the Battle of the Somme, was about 6 mi (9.7 km) to the foot of the Butte de Warlencourt and just east of Gueudecourt. On 2 November, Rupprecht wrote in his diary that the British were digging in west of Delville Wood to Martinpuich and Courcelette, which suggested that winter quarters were being built and that only minor operations were contemplated. Infantry attacks diminished but British artillery fire was constant, against which the large number of German guns in the area could only make a limited reply, due to a chronic shortage of ammunition. German counter-attacks were cancelled because of troop shortages. During the winter lull of 1916–1917, when sniping, trench raiding and artillery exchanges continued, the I Anzac Corps held the front from Gueudecourt to Le Sars and considered the area to be the foulest on the Somme front.

=== Stormy Trench, February 1917 ===
The I Anzac Corps held with two divisions a line of about 2.75 mi (4.43 km), which curved around the ruins of Gueudecourt. On 10 January the Fourth Army commander General Rawlinson asked for proposals for local attacks. A 400 yd (370 m) length of Stormy Trench was selected for an attack and when the temperature dropped in mid-January, freezing the mud, trench mortars could be dug in, ready to provide covering-fire. It was decided to attack at 7:00 p.m. on 1 February after a two-minute mortar barrage. The attack was to be conducted by 1 1/2 companies of the 15th Battalion of the 4th Australian Brigade, 4th Australian Division during the evening of 1 February. The nearest part of the trench was only 100 yd (91 m) from the Australian front line but on the right of the attack, the Australians were held up by uncut wire. The left-hand section reached the trench and bombed down it to take the rest. German counter-attacks began at 1:55 a.m. on 2 February but during an attack at 4:00 a.m., the Australian SOS signals were not seen for fifty minutes. By the time the artillery began to fire, the 15th Battalion had been repulsed with 144 casualties, fifty prisoners had been taken from the 4th Ersatz Division and German reports suggested that 163 casualties had been inflicted on them. The repulse was blamed on poor artillery support.

On 4 February, the 5th Australian Division was to attack Finch and Orion trenches. The 4th Brigade arranged to attack Stormy Trench again at the same time (10:00 p.m,) with the 13th Battalion. All four companies were to attack, with a company of the 14th Battalion in support and double the artillery of the first attack. A stock of 12,000 hand grenades was laid in at the jumping off trench and another 8,000 grenades were stored at the battalion headquarters. Carriers to supply the specialist bombers took as many as possible, which amounted to about 2,000 grenades for each company. Since the German grenade throwers had out-ranged the Australians on 1 February, 1,000 rifle grenades were also provided. The barrage began at 9:58 p.m., the Australians swiftly crossed no man's land and caught the trench garrison in their shelters, except on the right where a brief bombing engagement took place, before the Australians began to consolidate the trench, about twenty minutes after the advance began. The 10th Company of Infantry Regiment 362 lost 62 prisoners but a German counter-barrage began soon after the attack, which caught the company of the 14th Battalion in the jumping off trench. Counter-attacks began on the right flank and another bombing fight began and continued until dawn. The Australians lost about 350 casualties but a German counter-attack to recover the trench on 5 February was cancelled and the situation accepted.

=== 1918 ===
Gueudecourt was lost on 24 March 1918 during Operation Michael, the German spring offensive. The village was recaptured for the last time on 28 August, by the 17th (Northern) Division, during the Second Battle of Bapaume.

== Commemoration ==
=== Gueudecourt Memorial ===
The Gueudecourt Memorial is situated on the D 574 road, about 0.62 mi (1 km) north-east of the village, on a site that was the British front line of 17 November 1916, the final day of the British offensive at the Somme. Clearly visible behind the caribou, as seen from the memorial entrance, is a preserved trench line. The area of the memorial was seized by Newfoundland troops from the Germans on 12 October 1916 and marks the farthest point of advance of British units during the Battle of the Somme.
