= Bouvancourt =

- Commune
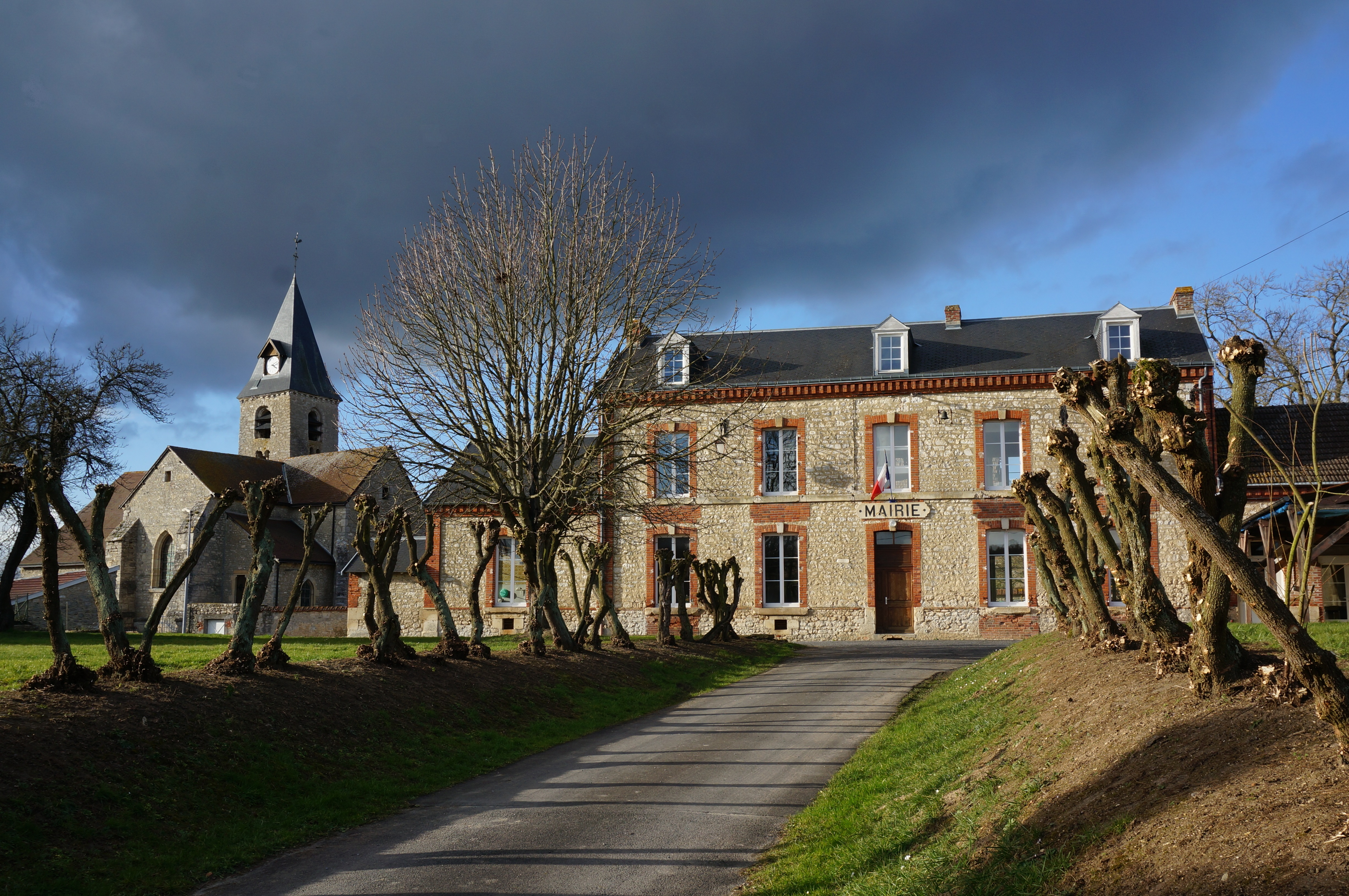
- The church and town hall in Bouvancourt
- Location of Bouvancourt
- Location within France Location within Grand Est
- Coordinates: 49°20′20″N 3°50′07″E
- Country: France
- Region: Grand Est
- Department: Marne
- Arrondissement: Reims
- Canton: Fismes-Montagne de Reims
- Intercommunality: CU Grand Reims

Government
  - Mayor (2020–2026): Arnaud Ninin
- Area^{1}: 12.91 km^{2} (4.98 sq mi)
- Elevation: 220 m (720 ft)
- Population (2023): 174
  - Density: 13.5/km^{2} (34.9/sq mi)
- Demonym: Bouvancourtois.e
- Time zone: UTC+01:00 (CET)
  - Summer (DST): UTC+02:00 (CEST)
- INSEE/Postal code: 51077 /51140
- ^{1} French Land Register data, which excludes lakes, ponds, glaciers > 1 km^{2} (0.386 sq mi or 247 acres) and river estuaries.

Bouvancourt (French pronunciation: [buvɑ̃kuʁ]) is a commune in the French department of Marne, region of Grand Est, northeastern France.

== Population ==
Historical population
Year	Pop.	±% p.a.
1968	188	—
1975	172	−1.26%
1982	166	−0.51%
1990	155	−0.85%
1999	157	+0.14%
2007	162	+0.39%
2012	202	+4.51%
2017	193	−0.91%
2023	174	−1.71%
Source: INSEE

== See also ==
- Communes of the Marne department
