= Ladama =

Latin alternative band

LADAMA
- Origin: Brazil, Colombia, Venezuela, United States
- Genres: Cumbia, maracatu, joropo, soul, pop
- Years active: 2014–present
- Label: Six Degrees
- Members: Mafer Bandola; Lara Klaus; Daniela Serna
- Past members: Sara Lucas
- Website: ladamaproject.org

LADAMA is a Latin alternative band of three women musicians and activists—Lara Klaus, Daniela Serna, and Maria "Mafer Bandola" González Olivo—originating from Brazil, Colombia, and Venezuela respectively, along with their collaborator, American bassist Pat Swoboda. Their music fuses sounds from South America and the Caribbean with soul, R&B, and pop.

In addition to public performances, LADAMA holds educational workshops in English, Spanish, and Portuguese, where they hope to provide a foundation for participants to "use music as a basic form of personal expression to address issues pertinent to them." LADAMA continues to perform and offer workshops at venues and festivals around the world. LADAMA seeks to empower primarily women and youth (but everyone is welcome) through these interactive musical experiences.

== History ==
The group formed in 2014 while touring the West Coast as part of the OneBeat Program. Their self-titled debut album was released September 8, 2017 on Six Degrees Records and reached No. 1 on both iTunes and Amazon's Latin Music Charts in January 2018. It contains mostly new songs written and performed by the band members, embracing a variety of Latin American musical genres. LADAMA has performed at TED, the Skoll World Forum, the 2018 Monterey Jazz Festival and on ESPN’s hispanic heritage special "The Latino Experience", which aired on October 10, 2017. In January 2018, they were featured on NPR's All Things Considered, which praised their "irresistible spirit and universal appeal." Their second album titled Oye Mujer (“Hey Woman”) was released on July 10, 2020."

== Band members ==
- Mafer Bandola (María Fernanda González Olivo) is a multi-instrumentalist and songwriter from Barquisimeto, Venezuela. Though she studied the mandolin, the cuatro and the violin, her primary instrument is the Bandola llanera. She was recognized as the world's best female bandola llanera player at the XXVI International Bandola Llanera Pedro Flores Festival in 2018. In addition to her performative mastery of the bandola llanera, Mafer Bandola is also a student of social communication, having studied at the University of Yacambú, and an educator, teaching advanced classes on the bandola llanera and working to create and codify a new way of teaching the instrument.
- Lara Klaus is a Recife, Brazil-based drummer, percussionist, singer, songwriter and educator. Her percussion instruments include pandeiro, alfaia, and zabumba, among others. She has played at numerous music festivals around the world (Montreux Jazz Festival [Switzerland], Latino Americando Festival [Italy], Samba Festival [Germany]) and taught all-ages workshops throughout South America, Europe and the United States. Klaus has performed with Elba Ramalho, Roberto Menescal, Moraes Moreira and Emílio Santiago and other Brazilian musicians. In March 2018 Lara released Força do Gesto on Six Degrees Records, a solo album exploring a variety of styles and instruments which features Klaus on drum-kit and guitar.
- Daniela Serna is a Bogotá-based composer, percussionist, educator and sound artist. Serna was noticed in 2012 after winning a Señal Radio Colombia contest to perform with legendary folk-singer bullerengue queen Petrona Martínez. In 2014 she presented "Bullerengue Covers," a sound installation exploring the sonics of tambour alegre (hand drum) and surrounding space for which El Puente, her experimental duo with Uva Lunera, composed the music. In the same year, Serna co-founded an all-female Caribbean folk band La Perla, and performed with the group until 2017. Serna continues to teach traditional Caribbean Colombian music styles (bullerengue, gaita, cumbia, porro, fandango) and perform with LADAMA.

== Former Members ==
- Sara Lucas is a New York City-based singer-songwriter and guitarist. Lucas co-founded LADAMA with Bandola, Klaus, Serna in 2014; Before LADAMA, Lucas co-founded the band Callers with Ryan Seaton, with which she produced three full-length albums (Fortune, Life of Love and Reviver) and a seven-inch split with Luaka Bop artist, Delicate Steve. In 2012, Callers featured on WNYC’s Soundcheck on Spinning on Air. The group has since performed at numerous festivals (Primavera Club, Tanned Tin Festival, Crossing Brooklyn Ferry at BAM, Festival de la Musica Nelle, Hillside Fest), toured with Dirty Projectors, Here We Go Magic, ESG and Wye Oak and shared stages with Nat Baldwin, Patti Smith, Arto Lindsay and Tune-Yards. In 2015 Lucas began serving as a facilitator for production workshops with youth in Brooklyn and Hudson, NY with Found Sound Nation and Hear Be Dragons. Lucas released a solo EP, Into Pink in 2020. In 2023, Lucas left LADAMA.

== Discography ==
=== Albums ===
- LADAMA (2017)
- Oye Mujer (2020)

=== Singles ===
- "Cuido Mi Raíz" (2024)
- "De Aquí Me Voy" (2024)
- "Malojillo" (2024)
