= Aurora Nealand =

American jazz musician

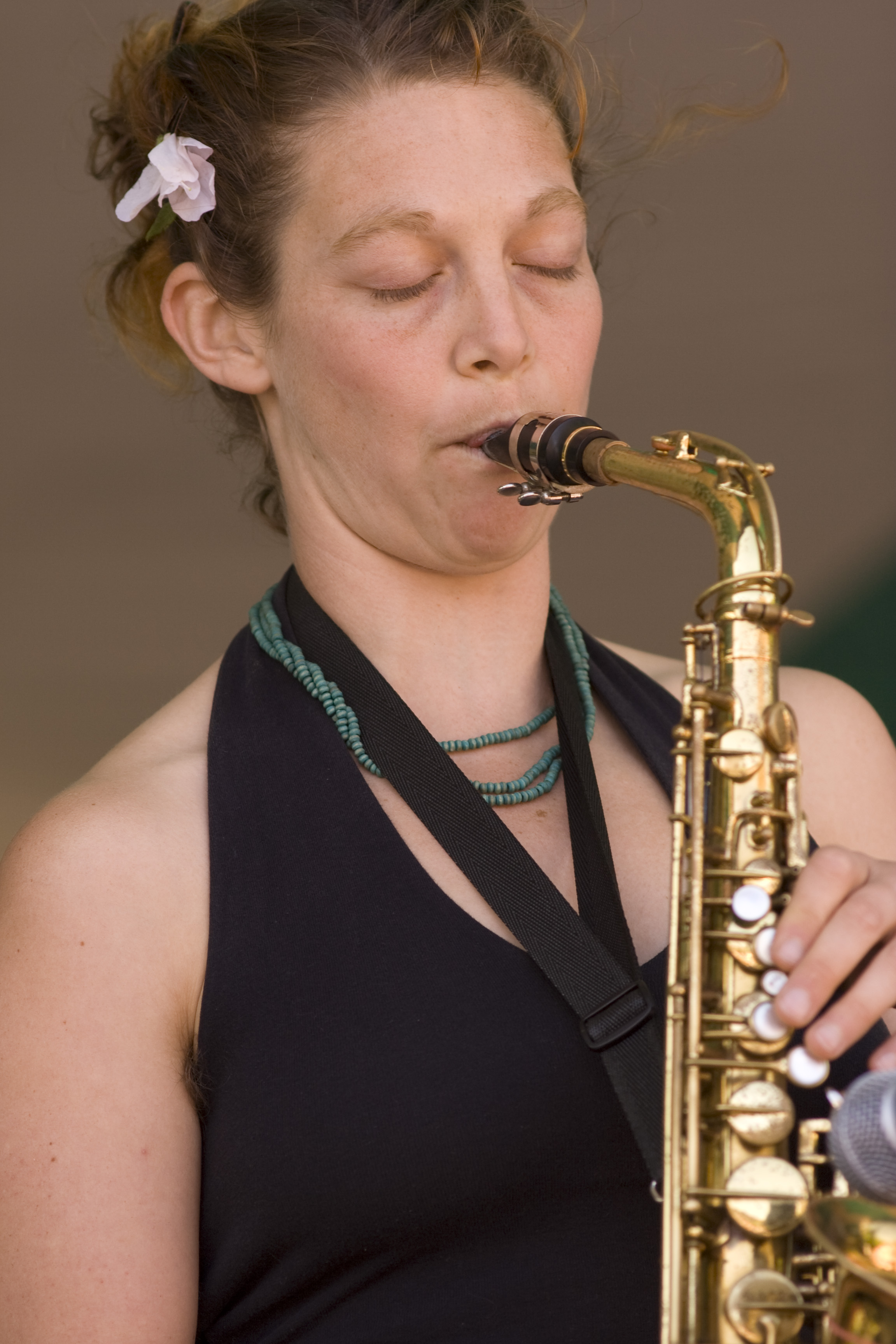
- Nealand performing at the French Quarter Festival in 2010

Background information
- Born: Pacifica, California, U.S.
- Origin: New Orleans, Louisiana, U.S.
- Instruments: Saxophone; vocals; clarinet; accordion
- Member of: Aurora Nealand and the Royal Roses; Rory Danger and the Danger Dangers; Monocle
- Education: Oberlin Conservatory of Music

Aurora Nealand is an American multi-instrumentalist (saxophone, clarinet, accordion), singer and composer. Among her many musical endeavors, she leads her own traditional jazz band, Aurora Nealand and the Royal Roses.

== Early life and education ==
Nealand was born the youngest of four children in Pacifica, California, to parents she calls "hippies". In 2001, Nealand earned a degree in music composition from the Oberlin Conservatory of Music, where she created her own major in music composition. While studying at Oberlin, Nealand spent eight months in New York City where she learned about Laurie Anderson, Brian Eno and Philip Glass. She also studied at the Jacques Lecoq School of Physical Theatre in Paris, France.

Nealand moved to New Orleans in 2004.

== Career ==
Nealand embarked on a cross country bicycle trip, during which she interviewed rural Americans and compiled their stories into a musical piece titled "American Dreams". The trip concluded in New Orleans, where she began playing traditional jazz, much of which she had grown up listening to in California. Nealand formed The Royal Roses in 2011 for a tribute concert to Sidney Bechet at Preservation Hall in New Orleans. Along with the Royal Roses, Nealand also performs as a member of the rockabilly band Rory Danger and the Danger Dangers and solo under the name The Monocle. In 2019, Nealand, under the name Monocle, brought her project "KindHumanKind" to the New Orleans Contemporary Arts Center, receiving a positive review from OffBeat magazine. Nealand began playing musical scores to the silent films of comedian Buster Keaton. She frequently performs in a duo with New Orleans pianist and singer Tom McDermott. As of 2023, her latest project is Aurora Nealand and the Reed Minders.

Over the course of her career, Nealand has performed with artists as diverse as Pauline Oliveros, Jonathan Hart Makwaia, Preservation Hall Allstars, Bill Frisell, Tim Berne, James Singleton, Arto Lindsey, Germaine Bazzle, John Boutté, and Johnny Vidacovich, among many others.

Nealand has performed as a featured artist at many venues and festivals worldwide, including Montreal International Jazz Festival, Istanbul Jazz Festival, Big Ears Festival, Copenhagen Jazz Festival, MPB Jazz Festival in Brazil, Lincoln Center, the Kennedy Center, SummerStage in New York City, and the New Orleans Jazz & Heritage Festival.

She has worked as a musical facilitator with Found Sound Nation, an organization which facilitates international musical collaboration. She has been a teacher and performer with the Walden School for Young Composers for 20 years. Additionally, she is the co-founder of SONO (Sound Observatory New Orleans), which facilitates workshops of new music in the New Orleans region.

Nealand was voted "Best Female Performer" by the 2016 Gambit awards, and her band was named "Best Traditional Jazz Band" in the 2015 and 2017 Big Easy Awards. She was named one of DownBeat magazine's "Rising Stars" on both soprano saxophone and clarinet in 2017, 2018, and 2020.

== Awards and honors ==
- 2021: South Arts: Jazz Road Creative Residencies grant recipient
- 2020: Downbeat Rising Star: Soprano Saxophone; Clarinet
- 2019: OffBeat Best of the Beat Award: Best Saxophonist
- 2018: Offbeat Best of the Beat Award: Best Saxophonist
- 2018: Gambit Big Easy Awards: Best Traditional Jazz Band
- 2018: Downbeat Rising Star: Soprano Saxophone; Clarinet
- 2018: Pivot Arts Incubator residency, Chicago
- 2017: Downbeat Rising Star: Soprano Saxophone; Clarinet
- 2017: Gambit Big Easy Awards: Best Traditional Jazz Band
- 2016: Gambit Big Easy Awards: Best Female Performer
- 2015: Gambit Big Easy Awards: Best Traditional Jazz Band
- 2014: Offbeat Best of the Beat Award: Best Saxophonist
- 2014: Contemporary Arts Center (New Orleans) residency
- 2013: MacDowell residency
- 2013: OneBeat Music Fellow (U.S.)
- Atlantic Center for the Arts residency

== Discography ==
Aurora Nealand and the Royal Roses

Title	Release date	Label
Tribute To Sidney Bechet - Live in New Orleans	April 29, 2011	Independent
Lookback Transmission	April 24, 2014	Independent
Comeback Children	April 11, 2016	Independent

Aurora Nealand and Tom McDermott

Title	Release date	Label
City of Timbres	May 8, 2015	Independent
Live at Luthjen's	March 2, 2020	CD Baby

=== Guest appearances ===
Album title	Song title	Release date	Label
Why Are We Building Such a Big Ship? (eponymous album)	–	2007	Nola Records
What's in the Bag?: New Orleans and Beyond (with Seva Venet)	–	2007	Independent
Lucky Devil (with Meschiya Lake and the Little Big Horns)	–	2010	Independent
Treme: Music from the HBO Original Series, Season 2	"Ferry Man" (with the Royal Roses)	2012	Rounder
Ingrid Lucia Presents New Orleans Nightengale Revue	"Ne me quitte pas"	2012	American Brat Collaboration
Gordon Webster Live in Rochester	–	2012	Gordon Webster Swings
Bamboula	"Opulence" (with Tom McDermott)	2013	Minky Records
WWOZ on CD: And We Just Keep Groovin'	"Ti Ralph" (with the Royal Roses)	2013	Friends of WWOZ
Riverboat Jazz Festival 2014: Classic Jazz in Danish Design	"I Cover the Waterfront" (as Aurora Nealand New Orleans Group)	2014	Riverboat Jazz Festival
I Wanna Sing Right: Rediscovering Lomax in Evangeline Country	"Rory O'Moore" (with Wilson Savoy, Joel Savoy and Joshua Caffery)	2015	Valcour Records
Best of the Good (with Panorama Jazz Band)		2016	Independent
The Next One (with Panorama Jazz Band)		2017	Independent
Kicks (with Rickie Lee Jones)	–	2019	The Other Side Of Desire
Letters to George (with George, Canadian band)	–	2023	Out Of Your Head Records
Oceans and (with Tim Berne and others)	–	2023	Intakt Records
Doubles (with Basher)	–	2022	Sinking City Records
Byron Asher's Skrontch Music: Lord, When You Send in the Rain	–	2024	Sinking City Records
