= List of Fantasy Boys contestants =

Fantasy Boys is a South Korean reality competition show created by MBC. The purpose of the show is to form a 12-member boy group with the potential to chart on Billboard. 55 contestants were chosen out of 1,000 applicants from around the world, primarily from South Korea, China, Taiwan, Japan, Thailand, and the United States, and divided into three groups known as "grades". After the final episode, the top twelve contestants were selected to debut as members of the boy group Fantasy Boys.

== Contestants ==
The English names of the contestants are presented in Eastern order in accordance with the official website.

The ages of all contestants are presented according to the Korean age system as of the start of the competition.

Color Key

Final members of FANTASY BOYS
Eliminated in the final episode
Eliminated in the semi-finals
Eliminated in the fourth semester
Eliminated in the third semester
Eliminated in the second semester
Eliminated in the first semester
Left the show
Top 12 of the episode
Saved with Producer Pick (Note: The main producer for each semester chooses a contestant to save from eliminations.)

List of Fantasy Boys contestants
Company	Name	Age	Grade evaluation		Ranking											
Company	Name	Age	1	2	Ep. 2	Ep. 4–5	Ep. 6–7	May 11, 2023 (Note: Interim results for ranks 10–14 were announced at the end of Episode 7.)	Ep. 8–9	May 18, 2023 (Note: Interim results for ranks 12–15 were announced at the end of Episode 8.)	May 25, 2023 (Note: Interim results for ranks 21–25 were announced at the end of Episode 9.)	Ep. 10 (Note: Announcements of ranks was broadcast live on June 1, 2023.)		Ep. 11		Final
Company	Name	Age	1	2	#	#	#	#	#	#	#	Points	#	Points	#	Final
Woollim Entertainment (울림엔터테인먼트)	Bae Jae-ho (배재호)	16	2	2	40	41	Eliminated									41
Individual Trainee (개인연습생)	Bae Seung-yoon (배승윤) (Note: Bae Seung-yoon is a former Be Mbitious contestant.)	26	3	3	Eliminated											44–54
Great M Entertainment (그레이트엠)	Cho Yeon-woo (조연우) (Note: Cho Yeon-woo is a child actor.)	19	3	3	Eliminated											44–54
Individual Trainee (개인연습생)	Choi Min-seo (최민서) (Note: Choi Min-seo is a former Cap-Teen contestant.)	20	2	2	38	40	Eliminated									40
Individual Trainee (개인연습생)	Daniel Hyunoo Lachapelle (복다니엘)	18	3	3	29	31	34	Not Shown	Not Shown	Eliminated						29–32
Individual Trainee (개인연습생)	Ha Jae-min (하재민)	21	3	3	Eliminated											44–54
Individual Trainee (개인연습생)	Ha Seok-hee (하석희) (Note: Ha Seok-hee is a former member of Kairos.) (Note: Ha Seok-hee and Park Min-geun are former Stars Awakening contestants.)	24	1	2	20	27	17	Not Shown	28	Not Shown	22	211,116.3	19	Not Shown		15–20
Individual Trainee (개인연습생)	Hayato (ハヤト) / (하야토)	20	3	3	25	24	24	Not Shown	27	Not Shown	25	Not Shown		Eliminated		23–28
Kiss Entertainment (키스엔터테인먼트)	Hikari (ヒカリ) / (히카리)	22	2	1	8	3	13	Not Shown	14	Not Shown		353,314.5	6	159,904.0	8	8
PocketDol Studio (포켓돌스튜디오)	Hikaru (ヒカル) / (히카루)	21	1	1	28	22	11	Not Shown	4	Not Shown		361,349.9	4	149,861.6	11	11
Individual Trainee (개인연습생)	Hinata (ヒナタ) / (히나타)	21	Left the show													
PocketDol Studio (포켓돌스튜디오)	Hong Seong-min (홍성민)	20	1	1	3	1	1	Not Shown	1	Not Shown		422,012.6	2	193,049.5	3	3
RBW	Hwang Jae-min (황재민)	22	1	1	22	26	16	Not Shown	16	Not Shown		315,010.3	10	Not Shown		15–20
True Fun Entertainment (趣放娛樂)	Ivan (蔡弘燁) / (아이반)	21	2	2	27	29	Not Shown	Eliminated								34–37
Future Idol (퓨처아이돌)	Jeon Byeong-cheol (전병철) (Note: Jeon Byeong-cheol is a member of Nonstop.)	21	3	3	Eliminated											44–54
Allart Entertainment (올라트)	Jeong Deun-haesol (정든해솔)	18	1	1	33	36	Not Shown	Eliminated								34–37
APlus Entertainment (에이플러스 엔터테인먼트)	Jin Myung-jae (진명재) (Note: Jin Myung-jae is a member of The Bigdipper.)	23	3	3	15	19	20	Not Shown	17	Not Shown		Not Shown		Eliminated		21–22
Individual Trainee (개인연습생)	Jung Bo-moon (정보문)	17	3	3	Eliminated											44–54
Individual Trainee (개인연습생)	Jung Goo-hyun (정구현)	21	3	3	Eliminated											44–54
PocketDol Studio (포켓돌스튜디오)	K-Soul (Note: K-Soul's legal name is Liu Zekai.) (苏尔) / (소울) (Note: K-Soul is a former Super Idol and We Are Young contestant.)	24	2	1	7	4	7	Not Shown	12	13	Not Shown	353,696.4	5	159,517.6	9	9
Individual Trainee (개인연습생)	Kaedan (카에단)	15	2	2	16	20	30	Not Shown	25	Not Shown	24	220,674.3	18	120,952.2	12	12
Urban Works Ent (얼반웍스이엔티)	Kang Dae-hyeon (강대현) (Note: Kang Dae-hyun is a former The Origin – A, B, Or What? contestant.)	21	1	1	17	7	12	Not Shown	8	Not Shown		264,462.1	16	Not Shown		15–20
Individual Trainee (개인연습생)	Kang Hyun-woo (강현우) (Note: Kang Hyun-woo, Kim Dae-hui, and Moon Hyeok-jun are former LOUD contestants.)	24	1	1	11	13	21	Not Shown	22	Not Shown		Not Shown		Eliminated		23–28
Maroo Entertainment (마루기획)	Kang I-rang (강이랑)	16	1	1	30	30	27	Not Shown	19	Not Shown	23	Not Shown		Eliminated		23–28
Individual Trainee (개인연습생)	Kang Min-seo (강민서)	23	2	2	14	16	9	11	13	Not Shown		314,298.3	11	165,743.2	7	7
Individual Trainee (개인연습생)	Kang Seon-jun (강선준)	23	3	3	Eliminated											44–54
Individual Trainee (개인연습생)	Keum Jin-ho (금진호)	24	2	2	31	21	22	Not Shown	15	Not Shown		207,409.7	20	Not Shown		15–20
PocketDol Studio (포켓돌스튜디오)	Kim Beom-jun (김범준)	20	2	2	35	34	32	Not Shown	24	Not Shown		Not Shown		Eliminated		23–28
Individual Trainee (개인연습생)	Kim Dae-hui (김대희)	24	2	1	36	35	31	Not Shown	21	Not Shown		Not Shown		Eliminated		23–28
JYP Entertainment (JYP 엔터테인먼트)	Kim Gyu-rae (김규래)	15	1	2	12	14	10	13	10	15	Not Shown	274,233.1	15	193,112.6	2	2
Redstart ENM (레드스타트 ENM)	Kim Kyu-hyun (김규현)	19	3	3	23	28	23	Not Shown	Not Shown	Eliminated						29–32
PocketDol Studio (포켓돌스튜디오)	Kim Woo-seok (김우석)	20	2	1	24	12	15	Not Shown	5	Not Shown		377,622.3	3	154,602.8	10	10
Individual Trainee (개인연습생)	Kim Seung-jun (김승준)	24	2	2	34	32	Not Shown	Eliminated								34–37
EZ Entertainment (EZ엔터테인먼트)	Lee Han-bin (이한빈)	23	1	1	18	17	3	12	23	12	Not Shown	336,698.0	8	178,369.4	5	5
Individual Trainee (개인연습생)	Ling Qi (凌崎) / (링치) (Note: Ling Qi is a former member of X-TIME and an Idol Producer contestant.)	22	1	2	10	5	8	Not Shown	7	Not Shown		352,679.7	7	170,671.5	6	6
One Cool Jacso Entertainment (원쿨잭소 엔터테인먼트)	Long Guohao (龙国豪) / (롱궈하오) (Note: Seo Sang-woo and Long Guohao are part of OCJ Newbies.)	23	3	3	Eliminated											44–54
Individual Trainee (개인연습생)	Moon Hyeok-jun (문혁준)	18	1	2	41	42	Eliminated									42
Rain Company (레인컴퍼니)	Moon Hyun-bin (문현빈) (Note: Moon Hyun-bin is a former Produce X 101 contestant and a member of Ciipher.)	24	3	3	5	8	5	Not Shown	6	Not Shown		303,731.8	13	Not Shown		13–14
Individual Trainee (개인연습생)	Moon Jae-young (문재영)	23	3	3	Eliminated											44–54
Individual Trainee (개인연습생)	Nam Jin-myung (남진명)	24	3	3	Eliminated											44–54
EZ Entertainment (EZ엔터테인먼트)	Nam Seung-hyun (남승현) (Note: Nam Seung-hyun is a former member of N.Cus.)	25	2	2	21	23	18	Not Shown	20	Not Shown		Not Shown		Eliminated		23–28
Individual Trainee (개인연습생)	Oh Byeong-yong (오병용)	21	3	3	Eliminated											44–54
Abyss Company (어비스컴퍼니)	Oh Hyeon-tae (오현태)	16	1	2	19	10	4	14	11	14	Not Shown	288,889.9	14	187,277.9	4	4
RBW	Park Hyeong-geun (박형근)	21	2	2	42	39	14	Not Shown	26	Not Shown		Not Shown		Eliminated		21–22
Individual Trainee (개인연습생)	Park Min-geun (박민근)	23	1	2	39	38	Eliminated									38
Individual Trainee (개인연습생)	Park Seong-min (박성민)	19	3	3	Eliminated											44–54
SOLE U	Santa (แซนต้า) / (산타) (Note: Santa and Yaya are both Thai actors.)	21	2	2	1	6	29	10	9	Not Shown		308,912.3	12	Not Shown		15–20
One Cool Jacso Entertainment (원쿨잭소 엔터테인먼트)	Seo Sang-woo (서상우)	21	2	2	32	33	26	Not Shown	Not Shown	Eliminated						29–32
Individual Trainee (개인연습생)	Shiryu (シリュウ / (시류)	23	2	2	26	25	19	Left the show								33
Eden Entertainment (이든엔터테인먼트)	Song Du-hyun (송두현)	19	2	2	37	37	25	Not Shown	Not Shown	Eliminated						29–32
GGA	Tae Seon (태선) (Note: Tae Seon is a former member of TRCNG and was also a contestant on Peak Time .)	24	2	1	6	9	6	Not Shown	3	Not Shown		318,784.7	9	Not Shown		13–14
SOLE U	TK (ทีเค) / (티케이)	21	3	3	13	18	Not Shown	Eliminated								34–37
SOLE U	Yaya (ยอด) / (야야)	27	3	3	4	11	Left the show									43
Individual Trainee (개인연습생)	Yu Jun-won (유준원) (Note: Yu Junwon is a former &Audition – The Howling contestant.)	21	1	1	2	2	2	Not Shown	2	Not Shown		526,688.8	1	206,124.1	1	1
Individual Trainee (개인연습생)	Yuma (ユウマ) / (유우마)	25	3	3	9	15	28	Not Shown	18	Not Shown	21	250,724.3	17	Not Shown		15–20

== Admission Evaluation (Episodes 1–2) ==
After the producers in the Producer Zone watch the Admission Evaluation performances, they will evaluate them by either choosing them by selecting 'O' or rejecting them with an 'X'. If a contestant gets chosen by all producers, they get placed in Grade 1; if they are chosen by two to three producers, they receive Grade 2; and if they are chosen by only one or none of the producers, they are assigned to Grade 3. Grade 3 contestants' admission will be put on hold for the time being and they become candidates for elimination, while Grade 1 and Grade 2 passed the admission evaluation and can enter the dorm.

Bold numbers are contestants whose performances were partially or entirely unaired during the episode broadcast. Full versions of the performances will be released on Naver NOW after the Admission Evaluation ends.

Admission Evaluation results
Performance			Contestant	Grade	
#	Artist(s)	Song(s)	Contestant	Initial	New
Episode 1
1	G.Soul	"Hate Everything"	Yu Jun-won	1	1
1	TXT	"Blue Hour" (5시 53분의 하늘에서 발견한 너와 나)	Yu Jun-won	1	1
2	Day6	"You Were Beautiful" (예뻤어)	TK	3	3
3	Oneus	"Lit" (가자)	Kang Min-seo	2	2
4	AJR	"3 O'Clock Things"	Oh Hyeon-tae	1	2
4	Armani White	"Billie Eilish"	Oh Hyeon-tae	1	2
5	SuperM	"Tiger Inside" (호랑이)	Kang Dae-hyeon	1	1
5	Jeff Bernat	"Call You Mine"	Kang Dae-hyeon	1	1
6	Monsta X	"Alligator"	Nam Jin-myung	3	3
7	NCT Dream	"Candy"	Kim Woo-seok	2	1
8	Taemin	"Flame of Love"	Shiryu	2	2
8	Bruno Mars	"When I Was Your Man"	Shiryu	2	2
9	Exo	"The Eve" (전야; 前夜)	Hikaru	1	1
10	Taemin	"Goodbye (Korean Ver.)" (さよならひとり)	K-Soul	2	1
11	NCT 127	"Kick It" (영웅)	Yuma	3	3
12	NewJeans	"Hype Boy"	Daniel Hyunoo Lachapelle	3	3
13	SHINee	"Stand By Me"	Moon Jae-young	3	3
14	The Weeknd, Kendrick Lamar	"Pray for Me"	Kim Beom-jun	2	2
15	Taemin	"Criminal"	Hong Seong-min	1	1
Episode 2
16	Pentagon	"Feelin' Like"	Moon Hyun-bin	3	3
17	Calum Scott	"You Are the Reason"	Yaya	3	3
17	Treasure	"Going Crazy" (미쳐가네)	Yaya	3	3
18	iKon	"Rhythm Ta" (리듬 타)	Kim Gyu-rae	1	2
19	Seventeen	"Fear" (독: Fear)	Jin Myung-jae	3	3
20	NCT Dream	"Boom"	Tae Seon	2	1
21	Treasure	"Jikjin" (직진)	Santa	2	2
22	AJ	"Dancing Shoes" (댄싱 슈즈)	Kang I-rang	1	1
23	Baekhyun	"UN Village"	Ha Seok-hee	1	2
24	Mamamoo	"HIP"	Hwang Jae-min	1	1
24	Mamamoo	"HIP"	Park Hyeong-geun	2	2
25	WayV	"Kick Back" (秘境)	Ling Qi	1	2
26	Stray Kids	"Maniac"	Hayato	3	3

Contestants with Unaired Performances
Contestant	Grade		Contestant	Grade	
Contestant	Initial	New	Contestant	Initial	New
Bae Jae-ho	2	2	Choi Min-seo	2	2
Hikari	2	1	Ivan	2	2
Jeong Deun-haesol	1	1	Kaedan	2	2
Kang Hyun-woo	1	1	Keum Jin-ho	2	2
Kim Dae-hui	2	1	Kim Kyu-hyun	3	3
Lee Han-bin	1	1	Moon Hyeok-jun	1	2
Nam Seung-hyun	2	2	Park Min-geun	1	2
Seo Sang-woo	2	2	Song Du-hyun	2	2
Bae Seung-yoon	3	3	Cho Yeon-woo	3	3
Ha Jae-min	3	3	Jeon Byeong-cheol	3	3
Jeon Boo-moon	3	3	Jun Goo-hyun	3	3
Kang Seon-jun	3	3	Long Guohao	3	3
Oh Byeong-yong	3	3	Park Seong-min	3	3

== First Semester – Idol DNA (Episode 2) ==
For the first semester, Jeon Soyeon served as the main producer. All the producers re-evaluated the grade for Grade 1 and Grade 2 contestants, with Grade 1 limited to 14 contestants. The pending admission for Grade 3 was selected based on the global vote. An early pass from the main producer was given during the interim check.

Color key

Moved Up to Grade 1
Moved Down to Grade 2
Early Pass
Eliminated

Grade 1 Re-evaluation results
Grade 1
Ha Seok-hee	Hikaru	Hong Seong-min	Hwang Jae-min
Jeong Deun-haesol	Kang Dae-hyeon	Kang Hyun-woo	Kang I-rang
Kim Gyu-rae	Lee Han-bin	Ling Qi	Moon Hyeok-jun
Oh Hyeon-tae	Park Min-geun	Yu Jun-won	

Grade 2 Re-evaluation results
Grade 2
Bae Jae-ho	Choi Min-seo	Hikari	Ivan
K-Soul	Kaedan	Kang Min-seo	Keum Jin-ho
Kim Beom-jun	Kim Dae-hui	Kim Woo-seok	Kim Seung-jun
Nam Seung-hyun	Park Hyeong-geun	Santa	Seo Sang-woo
Shiryu	Song Du-hyun	Tae Seon	

Grade 3 Pending Admission results
#	Name	Result
1	Yaya	Passed
2	Moon Hyun-bin	Passed
3	Yuma	Passed
4	TK	Passed
5	Jin Myung-jae	Passed
6	Kim Kyu-hyun	Passed
7	Hayato	Passed
8	Daniel Hyunoo Lachapelle	Passed
9	Ha Jae-min	Eliminated
10	Long Guohao	Eliminated
11	Park Seong-min	Eliminated
12	Kang Seon-jun	Eliminated
13	Nam Jin-myung	Eliminated
14	Jung Bo-moon	Eliminated
15	Bae Seung-yoon	Eliminated
16	Cho Yeon-woo	Eliminated
17	Oh Byeong-yong	Eliminated
18	Jung Goo-hyun	Eliminated
19	Jeon Byeong-cheol	Eliminated
20	Moon Jae-young	Eliminated

== Second Semester – Visual Mission (Episode 3–4) ==
Contestants are to rank each other by placing stickers on each other. The contestants with the most stickers have the advantage of choosing their choice of the team they want to join for the second semester's mission.

Visual Ranking Results
Name	No of Votes	Rank
Bae Jae-ho	1	32
Choi Min-seo	1	32
Daniel Hyunoo Lachapelle	3	21
Ha Seok-hee	4	15
Hayato	5	13
Hikari	9	6
Hikaru	5	13
Hong Seong-min	23	1
Hwang Jae-min	2	26
Ivan	3	21
Jeong Deun-haesol	1	32
Jin Myung-jae	2	26
K-Soul	10	5
Kaedan	7	9
Kang Dae-hyeon	2	26
Kang Hyun-woo	4	15
Kang I-rang	1	32
Kang Min-seo	4	15
Keum Jin-ho	1	32
Kim Beom-jun	1	32
Kim Dae-hui	2	26
Kim Gyu-rae	9	6
Kim Kyu-hyun	3	21
Kim Woo-seok	1	32
Kim Seung-jun	1	32
Lee Han-bin	3	21
Ling Qi	7	9
Moon Hyeok-jun	1	32
Moon Hyun-bin	9	6
Nam Seung-hyun	1	32
Oh Hyeon-tae	2	26
Park Hyeong-geun	4	15
Park Min-geun	1	32
Santa	13	4
Seo Sang-woo	2	26
Shiryu	3	21
Song Du-hyun	4	15
Tae Seon	17	3
TK	4	15
Yaya	7	9
Yu Jun-won	20	2
Yuma	6	12

Color key

Winner
Heart Fluttering Part 1
Heart Fluttering Part 2
Winner and Heart Fluttering Part

For the second semester, Jang Wooyoung served as the main producer.

A pre-mission 'Fashion Runway' will decide which member of each team will have the first heart fluttering part. Each team will stand on the runway and be given time to show off their charms. The boy who gets his photo taken the most by the Fantasy Makers will be assigned the first heart fluttering part for their team.

The second heart fluttering part will be assigned by the producers during the interim check.

The first place of each team will receive a benefit of 2,000 points.

Visual Mission Results
#	Performance		Team		Result	Contestants
#	Original artist(s)	Song	Theme	Name	Rank	Name
1	The Boyz	"The Stealer"	Military <제복>	FBIDOL	4	Jeong Deun-haesol
1	The Boyz	"The Stealer"	Military <제복>	FBIDOL	1	Ling Qi
1	The Boyz	"The Stealer"	Military <제복>	FBIDOL	5	Bok Daniel
1	The Boyz	"The Stealer"	Military <제복>	FBIDOL	2	Kim Woo-seok
1	The Boyz	"The Stealer"	Military <제복>	FBIDOL	7	Ivan
1	The Boyz	"The Stealer"	Military <제복>	FBIDOL	3	Kim Kyu-hyun
1	The Boyz	"The Stealer"	Military <제복>	FBIDOL	6	Moon Hyeok-jun
2	Stray Kids	"Thunderous" (소리꾼)	Asian Look <동양미>	The Thunderous (꾼들)	7	Park Min-geun
2	Stray Kids	"Thunderous" (소리꾼)	Asian Look <동양미>	The Thunderous (꾼들)	5	Nam Seung-hyun
2	Stray Kids	"Thunderous" (소리꾼)	Asian Look <동양미>	The Thunderous (꾼들)	3	Jin Myung-jae
2	Stray Kids	"Thunderous" (소리꾼)	Asian Look <동양미>	The Thunderous (꾼들)	1 (Note: K-Soul & Keum Jin-ho both received the same number of votes, making them joint-first place and receive 1,000 vote benefit each.)	K-Soul
2	Stray Kids	"Thunderous" (소리꾼)	Asian Look <동양미>	The Thunderous (꾼들)	6	Kim Beom-jun
2	Stray Kids	"Thunderous" (소리꾼)	Asian Look <동양미>	The Thunderous (꾼들)	4	Kim Seung-jun
2	Stray Kids	"Thunderous" (소리꾼)	Asian Look <동양미>	The Thunderous (꾼들)	1	Keum Jin-ho
3	Nct U	90's Love	Sporty Look <스포티룩>	Hipster Boys (힙스터보이즈)	2	Kang Min-seo
3	Nct U	90's Love	Sporty Look <스포티룩>	Hipster Boys (힙스터보이즈)	7	Bae Jae-ho
3	Nct U	90's Love	Sporty Look <스포티룩>	Hipster Boys (힙스터보이즈)	4	Hikaru
3	Nct U	90's Love	Sporty Look <스포티룩>	Hipster Boys (힙스터보이즈)	6	Kang Hyun-woo
3	Nct U	90's Love	Sporty Look <스포티룩>	Hipster Boys (힙스터보이즈)	1	Oh Hyeon-tae
3	Nct U	90's Love	Sporty Look <스포티룩>	Hipster Boys (힙스터보이즈)	5	Park Hyeong-geun
3	Nct U	90's Love	Sporty Look <스포티룩>	Hipster Boys (힙스터보이즈)	3	Seo Sang-woo
4	BTS	"Boy In Luv" (상남자)	School Look <스쿨룩>	Fantasy Shaker (판타지 쉐이커)	1	Kang Dae-hyeon
4	BTS	"Boy In Luv" (상남자)	School Look <스쿨룩>	Fantasy Shaker (판타지 쉐이커)	2	Kim Gyu-rae (Note: The Heart Fluttering Parts were rearranged during interim check.)
4	BTS	"Boy In Luv" (상남자)	School Look <스쿨룩>	Fantasy Shaker (판타지 쉐이커)	5	Kim Dae-hui
4	BTS	"Boy In Luv" (상남자)	School Look <스쿨룩>	Fantasy Shaker (판타지 쉐이커)	6	Santa
4	BTS	"Boy In Luv" (상남자)	School Look <스쿨룩>	Fantasy Shaker (판타지 쉐이커)	4	Song Du-hyun
4	BTS	"Boy In Luv" (상남자)	School Look <스쿨룩>	Fantasy Shaker (판타지 쉐이커)	7	Yaya
4	BTS	"Boy In Luv" (상남자)	School Look <스쿨룩>	Fantasy Shaker (판타지 쉐이커)	3	Hwang Jae-min
5	TXT	"Crown" (어느 날 머리에서 뿔이 자랐다)	Marine Look <마린룩>	Jewels (보석들)	7	Yuma
5	TXT	"Crown" (어느 날 머리에서 뿔이 자랐다)	Marine Look <마린룩>	Jewels (보석들)	3	Lee Han-bin
5	TXT	"Crown" (어느 날 머리에서 뿔이 자랐다)	Marine Look <마린룩>	Jewels (보석들)	2	Ha Seok-hee
5	TXT	"Crown" (어느 날 머리에서 뿔이 자랐다)	Marine Look <마린룩>	Jewels (보석들)	6	Kaedan
5	TXT	"Crown" (어느 날 머리에서 뿔이 자랐다)	Marine Look <마린룩>	Jewels (보석들)	5	Kang I-rang
5	TXT	"Crown" (어느 날 머리에서 뿔이 자랐다)	Marine Look <마린룩>	Jewels (보석들)	1	Hikari
5	TXT	"Crown" (어느 날 머리에서 뿔이 자랐다)	Marine Look <마린룩>	Jewels (보석들)	4	Moon Hyun-bin
6	Ateez	"Deja Vu"	Vampire Look <뱀파이어룩>	Blood Seven (블러드 세븐)	6	TK
6	Ateez	"Deja Vu"	Vampire Look <뱀파이어룩>	Blood Seven (블러드 세븐)	5	Shiryu
6	Ateez	"Deja Vu"	Vampire Look <뱀파이어룩>	Blood Seven (블러드 세븐)	2	Tae Seon
6	Ateez	"Deja Vu"	Vampire Look <뱀파이어룩>	Blood Seven (블러드 세븐)	1	Hong Seong-min
6	Ateez	"Deja Vu"	Vampire Look <뱀파이어룩>	Blood Seven (블러드 세븐)	4	Yu Jun-won
6	Ateez	"Deja Vu"	Vampire Look <뱀파이어룩>	Blood Seven (블러드 세븐)	3	Hayato
6	Ateez	"Deja Vu"	Vampire Look <뱀파이어룩>	Blood Seven (블러드 세븐)	7	Choi Min-seo

== Third Semester – Idols' Expertise Field Mission (Episode 5–6) ==
For the third semester, Jin-young served as the main producer.

Each song has a set number of contestants for each position: Dance, Vocal and Rap. Vocal positions take the vocal and ad lib sections. Dance positions take the dance break section. Rap positions must show their capabilities through rap making.

The first three contestants who are able to pick their choice of song were based on a pre-match unknowingly carried out in the morning before the mission announcement. The highest karaoke scores determined first place for vocal and rap positions, and dance position's first place was chosen by Random Play Dance. The first three contestants is as follows: Moon Hyun Bin (dance), Hikaru (vocal), and Seo Sang Woo (rap).

The remaining order of contestants to pick their chosen song & position were based on a lucky draw. Contestants can also challenge an already occupied position through a 1:1 battle, where the other members of the same song can choose whom to take into their team.

The contestants who take first place in either vocal, rap, or dance positions over the other contestants in the same position will receive a benefit of 10,000 points each. The members of the same team as the first place contestants will also receive a benefit of 5,000 points each.

Total individual points are added in the following way: Onsite audience votes are multiplied by 500, plus online global voting score, plus any benefits gained from winning first place (position benefit and team benefit).

Color key

Winner
Leader
Winner and Leader

Idols' Expertise Field Mission Results
#	Performance		Team	Rank		Contestants	
#	Original artist(s)	Song	Name	Within Team	Overall	Position	Name
1	WINNER	"REALLY REALLY"	REALZ	1	1 (Note: Lee Han-bin & Hong Seong-min both won first place in the vocal and dance positions respectively, resulting in all members of the team to receive a total of 10,000 points each.)	Vocal 1	Lee Han-bin
1	WINNER	"REALLY REALLY"	REALZ	2	8	Vocal 2	Hikaru
1	WINNER	"REALLY REALLY"	REALZ	1	3	Rap 1	Kim Gyu-rae
1	WINNER	"REALLY REALLY"	REALZ	2	6	Rap 2	Hikari
1	WINNER	"REALLY REALLY"	REALZ	3	10	Rap 3	Kim Beom-jun
1	WINNER	"REALLY REALLY"	REALZ	1	1	Dance 1	Hong Seong-min
1	WINNER	"REALLY REALLY"	REALZ	2	3	Dance 2	Oh Hyeon-tae
2	Monsta X	"Shoot Out"	Hardtack (건빵)	1	5	Vocal 1	Nam Seung-hyun
2	Monsta X	"Shoot Out"	Hardtack (건빵)	2	13	Vocal 2	Bok Daniel
2	Monsta X	"Shoot Out"	Hardtack (건빵)	3	12	Vocal 3	Kim Dae-hui
2	Monsta X	"Shoot Out"	Hardtack (건빵)	2	8	Rap 1	Seo Sang-woo
2	Monsta X	"Shoot Out"	Hardtack (건빵)	1	5	Rap 2	Song Du-hyun
2	Monsta X	"Shoot Out"	Hardtack (건빵)	1	6	Dance 1	Jin Myung-jae
2	Monsta X	"Shoot Out"	Hardtack (건빵)	2	7	Dance 2	Keum Jin-ho
3	BTS	"I Need U"	U Need Us	3	11	Vocal 1	Kim Seung-jun
3	BTS	"I Need U"	U Need Us	2	9	Vocal 2	Kim Woo-seok
3	BTS	"I Need U"	U Need Us	1	7	Vocal 3	Kang Dae-hyeon
3	BTS	"I Need U"	U Need Us	1	4	Rap 1	Kim Kyu-hyun
3	BTS	"I Need U"	U Need Us	2	9	Rap 2	Kang I-rang
3	BTS	"I Need U"	U Need Us	2	9	Dance 1	Hayato
3	BTS	"I Need U"	U Need Us	1	8	Dance 2	Shiryu
3	BTS	"I Need U"	U Need Us	3	11	Dance 3	Jeong Deun-haesol
4	Stray Kids	"MIROH"	X-Dream	2	10	Vocal 1	Yuma
4	Stray Kids	"MIROH"	X-Dream	1	6	Vocal 2	Tae Seon
4	Stray Kids	"MIROH"	X-Dream	1	1	Rap 1	Park Hyeong-geun
4	Stray Kids	"MIROH"	X-Dream	2	11	Rap 2	Kaedan
4	Stray Kids	"MIROH"	X-Dream	3	13	Dance 1	TK
4	Stray Kids	"MIROH"	X-Dream	2	12	Dance 2	Santa
4	Stray Kids	"MIROH"	X-Dream	1	10	Dance 3	Ivan
5	Exo	"Monster"	Monsters of All Trades (팔방몬스터'S)	2	3	Vocal 1	Ha Seok-hee
5	Exo	"Monster"	Monsters of All Trades (팔방몬스터'S)	1	2	Vocal 2	Moon Hyun-bin
5	Exo	"Monster"	Monsters of All Trades (팔방몬스터'S)	3	4	Vocal 3	Hwang Jae-min
5	Exo	"Monster"	Monsters of All Trades (팔방몬스터'S)	1	2	Rap 1	K-Soul
5	Exo	"Monster"	Monsters of All Trades (팔방몬스터'S)	2	7	Rap 2	Kang Hyun-woo
5	Exo	"Monster"	Monsters of All Trades (팔방몬스터'S)	1	2	Dance 1	Ling Qi
5	Exo	"Monster"	Monsters of All Trades (팔방몬스터'S)	3	5	Dance 2	Yu Jun-won
5	Exo	"Monster"	Monsters of All Trades (팔방몬스터'S)	2	4	Dance 3	Kang Min-seo

Ranking based on Positions
Vocal		Rap		Dance	
Name	Rank	Name	Rank	Name	Rank
Bok Daniel	13	Hikari	6	Hayato	9
Ha Seok-hee	3	Kim Gyu-rae	3	Hong Seong-min	1
Hikaru	8	K-Soul	2	Jin Myung-jae	6
Hwang Jae-min	4	Kaedan	11	Kang Min-seo	4
Kang Dae-hyeon	7	Kang Hyun-woo	7	Keum Jin-ho	7
Kim Dae-hui	12	Kang I-rang	9	Ivan	10
Kim Seung-jun	11	Kim Beom-jun	10	Jeong Deun-haesol	11
Kim Woo-seok	9	Kim Kyu-hyun	4	Ling Qi	2
Lee Han-bin	1	Park Hyeong-geun	1	Oh Hyeon-tae	3
Moon Hyun-bin	2	Seo Sang-woo	8	Santa	12
Nam Seung-hyun	5	Song Du-hyun	5	Shiryu	8
Tae Seon	6			TK	13
Yuma	10			Yu Jun-won	5

== Fourth Semester – Teamwork Mission (Episode 7–8) ==
For the fourth semester, Kang Seung-yoon served as the main producer.

Each team will have seven members and contestants are free to choose the team members they want. Each team is also responsible of creating their own choreography. Songs are chosen in a first come first served basis, in the order that the team creation is completed.

During the interim evaluation, one member will be released from each of the four teams of seven, excluding the team that won first place. The three released members is then to join the My First and Last team, which was the last team formed with the remaining four contestants.

Team scores are given by adding the scores of the live audience, producers and trainers. Benefits are given based on the team rankings: 1st place will receive benefits for all members, 2nd place will receive benefits for three members, 3rd place team for two members, 4th place for one member, and last place receives no benefits. The leader of each team will decide who receives the benefit. The benefit scores will be four times more than the number of live votes.

Color key

Winner
Leader
Leader and received benefit scores
Members who received benefit scores

Teamwork Mission Results
#	Performance		Team	Result		Contestants
#	Original artist(s)	Song	Name	Points	Rank	Name
1	Exo	"Ko Ko Bop"	Fivetop (파이브탑)	2600	4	Yuma
1	Exo	"Ko Ko Bop"	Fivetop (파이브탑)	2600	4	Hikari
1	Exo	"Ko Ko Bop"	Fivetop (파이브탑)	2600	4	K-Soul
1	Exo	"Ko Ko Bop"	Fivetop (파이브탑)	2600	4	Santa
1	Exo	"Ko Ko Bop"	Fivetop (파이브탑)	2600	4	Ling Qi
1	Exo	"Ko Ko Bop"	Fivetop (파이브탑)	2600	4	Kim Woo-seok
2	Wanna One	"Energetic" (에너제틱)	Cheesestick (치즈스틱)	3060	3	Ha Seok-hee
2	Wanna One	"Energetic" (에너제틱)	Cheesestick (치즈스틱)	3060	3	Hwang Jae-min
2	Wanna One	"Energetic" (에너제틱)	Cheesestick (치즈스틱)	3060	3	Kang Dae-hyun
2	Wanna One	"Energetic" (에너제틱)	Cheesestick (치즈스틱)	3060	3	Moon Hyun-bin
2	Wanna One	"Energetic" (에너제틱)	Cheesestick (치즈스틱)	3060	3	Song Du-hyun
2	Wanna One	"Energetic" (에너제틱)	Cheesestick (치즈스틱)	3060	3	Kim Gyu-rae
3	TXT	"Sugar Rush Ride"	Sweet-Together	3390	1	Tae Seon
3	TXT	"Sugar Rush Ride"	Sweet-Together	3390	1	Hong Seong-min
3	TXT	"Sugar Rush Ride"	Sweet-Together	3390	1	Hikaru
3	TXT	"Sugar Rush Ride"	Sweet-Together	3390	1	Yu Jun-won
3	TXT	"Sugar Rush Ride"	Sweet-Together	3390	1	Oh Hyeon-tae
3	TXT	"Sugar Rush Ride"	Sweet-Together	3390	1	Kim Dae-hui
4	NCT Dream	"My First and Last" (마지막 첫사랑)	너드남들	2600	4	Seo Sang-woo
4	NCT Dream	"My First and Last" (마지막 첫사랑)	너드남들	2600	4	Bok Daniel
4	NCT Dream	"My First and Last" (마지막 첫사랑)	너드남들	2600	4	Kim Beom-jun
4	NCT Dream	"My First and Last" (마지막 첫사랑)	너드남들	2600	4	Kim Kyu-hun
4	NCT Dream	"My First and Last" (마지막 첫사랑)	너드남들	2600	4	Kaedan (Note: Released member from Ko Ko Bop team.)
4	NCT Dream	"My First and Last" (마지막 첫사랑)	너드남들	2600	4	Hayato (Note: Released member from Energetic team.)
4	NCT Dream	"My First and Last" (마지막 첫사랑)	너드남들	2600	4	Kang I-rang (Note: Released member from Sugar Rush Ride team.)
5	BTS	"Not Today"	소년탄단지	3210	2	Jin Myung-jae
5	BTS	"Not Today"	소년탄단지	3210	2	Lee Han-bin
5	BTS	"Not Today"	소년탄단지	3210	2	Kang Min-seo
5	BTS	"Not Today"	소년탄단지	3210	2	Kang Hyun-woo
5	BTS	"Not Today"	소년탄단지	3210	2	Keum Jin-ho
5	BTS	"Not Today"	소년탄단지	3210	2	Park Hyeong-geun
5	BTS	"Not Today"	소년탄단지	3210	2	Nam Seung-hyun

== Semi-final – Producer's New Song Mission (Episode 9–10) ==
The two teams @IN_US and Runners performed their songs "SPACEMAN" and "RUN" respectively at MBC's Show! Music Core on May 20, and SBS M's The Show on May 23 prior to the release of the episode 9.

The four main producers creates four teams and chooses the seven members for their team in the order: Soyeon, Seung-yoon, Wooyoung and Jin-young.

A total of three benefits can be received, two individual benefits and one team benefit.

The first individual benefit is the member with the most votes from the onsite audience. The second individual benefit is the producer's pick benefit. Regardless of the audience vote, the producer in charge of each team will choose one contestant who they think did well in the performance.

In addition to the two types of individual benefits, the team with the highest total number of onsite audience votes will have all of its members receive benefits.

The two teams Sugar Pop and Flash performed their songs "Snacks" and "Hold me tight" at MBC's Show! Music Core on May 27, and SBS M's The Show on May 30.

Episode 10 was aired live on June 1, 2023 where semi-final eliminations and live text voting took place. A total of 20 contestants made it into the finals.

Color key

Winner
Producer Pick
Winner and Producer Pick

Semi-final Results
#	Performance			Team		Result	Contestants
#	Producer	Song	Credit	Name	Rank	Rank	Name
1	Jeon Soyeon	"Spaceman" (스페이스맨)	Lyrics: Jeon Soyeon, K-Soul (Note: K-Soul, Kim Beom-jun & Park Hyeong-geun, participated in the rap making for their respective mission songs.) Go Yu-kyung, Kwon So-hee; Composition: The Proof, Christian Fast, Didrik Thott	@IN_US (IN_어스)	1	2	Hong Seong-min
1	Jeon Soyeon	"Spaceman" (스페이스맨)	Lyrics: Jeon Soyeon, K-Soul Go Yu-kyung, Kwon So-hee; Composition: The Proof, Christian Fast, Didrik Thott	@IN_US (IN_어스)	1	1	Lee Han-Bin
1	Jeon Soyeon	"Spaceman" (스페이스맨)	Lyrics: Jeon Soyeon, K-Soul Go Yu-kyung, Kwon So-hee; Composition: The Proof, Christian Fast, Didrik Thott	@IN_US (IN_어스)	1	3	Kim Gyu-rae
1	Jeon Soyeon	"Spaceman" (스페이스맨)	Lyrics: Jeon Soyeon, K-Soul Go Yu-kyung, Kwon So-hee; Composition: The Proof, Christian Fast, Didrik Thott	@IN_US (IN_어스)	1	5	Ha Seok-hee
1	Jeon Soyeon	"Spaceman" (스페이스맨)	Lyrics: Jeon Soyeon, K-Soul Go Yu-kyung, Kwon So-hee; Composition: The Proof, Christian Fast, Didrik Thott	@IN_US (IN_어스)	1	6	Hayato
1	Jeon Soyeon	"Spaceman" (스페이스맨)	Lyrics: Jeon Soyeon, K-Soul Go Yu-kyung, Kwon So-hee; Composition: The Proof, Christian Fast, Didrik Thott	@IN_US (IN_어스)	1	7	Santa
1	Jeon Soyeon	"Spaceman" (스페이스맨)	Lyrics: Jeon Soyeon, K-Soul Go Yu-kyung, Kwon So-hee; Composition: The Proof, Christian Fast, Didrik Thott	@IN_US (IN_어스)	1	4	K-Soul
2	Kang Seung-yoon	"Run" (뛰어)	Lyrics: Kang Seung-yoon; Composition: Kang Seung-yoon, Kang Wook-jin, Diggy	Runners (러너즈)	Undisclosed	3	Hikaru
2	Kang Seung-yoon	"Run" (뛰어)	Lyrics: Kang Seung-yoon; Composition: Kang Seung-yoon, Kang Wook-jin, Diggy	Runners (러너즈)	Undisclosed	6	Kang Hyun-woo
2	Kang Seung-yoon	"Run" (뛰어)	Lyrics: Kang Seung-yoon; Composition: Kang Seung-yoon, Kang Wook-jin, Diggy	Runners (러너즈)	Undisclosed	2	Oh Hyeon-tae
2	Kang Seung-yoon	"Run" (뛰어)	Lyrics: Kang Seung-yoon; Composition: Kang Seung-yoon, Kang Wook-jin, Diggy	Runners (러너즈)	Undisclosed	1	Kim Woo-seok
2	Kang Seung-yoon	"Run" (뛰어)	Lyrics: Kang Seung-yoon; Composition: Kang Seung-yoon, Kang Wook-jin, Diggy	Runners (러너즈)	Undisclosed	4	Keum Jin-ho
2	Kang Seung-yoon	"Run" (뛰어)	Lyrics: Kang Seung-yoon; Composition: Kang Seung-yoon, Kang Wook-jin, Diggy	Runners (러너즈)	Undisclosed	7	Kim Dae-hui
2	Kang Seung-yoon	"Run" (뛰어)	Lyrics: Kang Seung-yoon; Composition: Kang Seung-yoon, Kang Wook-jin, Diggy	Runners (러너즈)	Undisclosed	5	Kang I-rang
3	Jin-young	"Hold Me Tight" (꽉잡아)	Lyrics: Jin-young, Kim Beom-jun; Composition: Jin-young, Kang Myung-shin	"Flash" (주마등)	Undisclosed	4	Moon Hyun-bin
3	Jin-young	"Hold Me Tight" (꽉잡아)	Lyrics: Jin-young, Kim Beom-jun; Composition: Jin-young, Kang Myung-shin	"Flash" (주마등)	Undisclosed	2	Kang Min-seo
3	Jin-young	"Hold Me Tight" (꽉잡아)	Lyrics: Jin-young, Kim Beom-jun; Composition: Jin-young, Kang Myung-shin	"Flash" (주마등)	Undisclosed	6	Kang Dae-hyeon
3	Jin-young	"Hold Me Tight" (꽉잡아)	Lyrics: Jin-young, Kim Beom-jun; Composition: Jin-young, Kang Myung-shin	"Flash" (주마등)	Undisclosed	5	Hwang Jae-min
3	Jin-young	"Hold Me Tight" (꽉잡아)	Lyrics: Jin-young, Kim Beom-jun; Composition: Jin-young, Kang Myung-shin	"Flash" (주마등)	Undisclosed	1	Hikari
3	Jin-young	"Hold Me Tight" (꽉잡아)	Lyrics: Jin-young, Kim Beom-jun; Composition: Jin-young, Kang Myung-shin	"Flash" (주마등)	Undisclosed	7	Kim Beom-jun
3	Jin-young	"Hold Me Tight" (꽉잡아)	Lyrics: Jin-young, Kim Beom-jun; Composition: Jin-young, Kang Myung-shin	"Flash" (주마등)	Undisclosed	3	Yuma
4	Jang Wooyoung	"Snacks" (스낵스)	Lyrics: Jang Wooyoung, Park Hyeong-geun; Composition: GARDEN, KRADY, Jang Wooyoung	Sugar Pop (슈가팝)	Undisclosed	1	Yu Jun-won
4	Jang Wooyoung	"Snacks" (스낵스)	Lyrics: Jang Wooyoung, Park Hyeong-geun; Composition: GARDEN, KRADY, Jang Wooyoung	Sugar Pop (슈가팝)	Undisclosed	2	Ling Qi
4	Jang Wooyoung	"Snacks" (스낵스)	Lyrics: Jang Wooyoung, Park Hyeong-geun; Composition: GARDEN, KRADY, Jang Wooyoung	Sugar Pop (슈가팝)	Undisclosed	5	Jin Myung-jae
4	Jang Wooyoung	"Snacks" (스낵스)	Lyrics: Jang Wooyoung, Park Hyeong-geun; Composition: GARDEN, KRADY, Jang Wooyoung	Sugar Pop (슈가팝)	Undisclosed	4	Tae Seon
4	Jang Wooyoung	"Snacks" (스낵스)	Lyrics: Jang Wooyoung, Park Hyeong-geun; Composition: GARDEN, KRADY, Jang Wooyoung	Sugar Pop (슈가팝)	Undisclosed	6	Nam Seung-hyun
4	Jang Wooyoung	"Snacks" (스낵스)	Lyrics: Jang Wooyoung, Park Hyeong-geun; Composition: GARDEN, KRADY, Jang Wooyoung	Sugar Pop (슈가팝)	Undisclosed	7	Park Hyeong-geun
4	Jang Wooyoung	"Snacks" (스낵스)	Lyrics: Jang Wooyoung, Park Hyeong-geun; Composition: GARDEN, KRADY, Jang Wooyoung	Sugar Pop (슈가팝)	Undisclosed	3	Kaedan

== Final (Episode 10–11) ==
The two teams Black Perfume and SWITCH performed their songs "Gesture" and "Shut Off" respectively at MBC's Show! Music Core on June 3, prior to the release of the episode 11.

The two teams are divided with the top 2 ranked contestants (the two boys who got the most global votes from Semester 1 to Semi-final round minus the benefits) as the team representatives, Hong Seong-min and Yu Jun-won. The two representatives picks their own team members, with Jun-won picking his team members first. A physical competition also took place where the first team to win two games will get to choose the song they want for the final mission.

After each performance, voting by the on-site audience and producers is conducted, where they are also to cast votes for multiple contestants if they wish to do so. The total individual on-site votes are calculated with each audience vote and each producer vote are multiplied by 10. The team with the higher average of on-site votes will receive a benefit of 2,000 points for each team member.

The total points for the finale round and to determine the final debut members is as follows: final mission score, finale benefit if gained, online global votes, offline special votes multiplied by 100, and live text votes multiplied by 30.

Episode 11 was broadcast live on June 8, 2023 where the finale and live text voting took place to determine the final 12 contestants.

Color key

Winner
Leader

Finale Results
Performance			Team		Contestant
#	Song	Credit	Name	Points	Name
1	"Gesture"	Lyrics: CiELO, Moode; Composition: CiELO, Moode, JOOAN, COUGAR; Arrangement: CiELO, COUGAR	블랙 퍼퓸 (Black Perfume)	1,746	Yu Jun-won
1	"Gesture"	Lyrics: CiELO, Moode; Composition: CiELO, Moode, JOOAN, COUGAR; Arrangement: CiELO, COUGAR	블랙 퍼퓸 (Black Perfume)	1,746	Kim Gyu-rae
1	"Gesture"	Lyrics: CiELO, Moode; Composition: CiELO, Moode, JOOAN, COUGAR; Arrangement: CiELO, COUGAR	블랙 퍼퓸 (Black Perfume)	1,746	Hikari
1	"Gesture"	Lyrics: CiELO, Moode; Composition: CiELO, Moode, JOOAN, COUGAR; Arrangement: CiELO, COUGAR	블랙 퍼퓸 (Black Perfume)	1,746	Yuma
1	"Gesture"	Lyrics: CiELO, Moode; Composition: CiELO, Moode, JOOAN, COUGAR; Arrangement: CiELO, COUGAR	블랙 퍼퓸 (Black Perfume)	1,746	Lee Han-bin
1	"Gesture"	Lyrics: CiELO, Moode; Composition: CiELO, Moode, JOOAN, COUGAR; Arrangement: CiELO, COUGAR	블랙 퍼퓸 (Black Perfume)	1,746	Kim Woo-seok
1	"Gesture"	Lyrics: CiELO, Moode; Composition: CiELO, Moode, JOOAN, COUGAR; Arrangement: CiELO, COUGAR	블랙 퍼퓸 (Black Perfume)	1,746	Hikaru
1	"Gesture"	Lyrics: CiELO, Moode; Composition: CiELO, Moode, JOOAN, COUGAR; Arrangement: CiELO, COUGAR	블랙 퍼퓸 (Black Perfume)	1,746	Kang Dae-hyeon
1	"Gesture"	Lyrics: CiELO, Moode; Composition: CiELO, Moode, JOOAN, COUGAR; Arrangement: CiELO, COUGAR	블랙 퍼퓸 (Black Perfume)	1,746	Hwang Jae-min
1	"Gesture"	Lyrics: CiELO, Moode; Composition: CiELO, Moode, JOOAN, COUGAR; Arrangement: CiELO, COUGAR	블랙 퍼퓸 (Black Perfume)	1,746	Moon Hyun-bin
1	"Gesture"	Lyrics: CiELO, Moode; Composition: CiELO, Moode, JOOAN, COUGAR; Arrangement: CiELO, COUGAR	블랙 퍼퓸 (Black Perfume)	1,746	Tae Seon
1	"Gesture"	Lyrics: CiELO, Moode; Composition: CiELO, Moode, JOOAN, COUGAR; Arrangement: CiELO, COUGAR	블랙 퍼퓸 (Black Perfume)	1,746	Keum Jin-ho
1	"Gesture"	Lyrics: CiELO, Moode; Composition: CiELO, Moode, JOOAN, COUGAR; Arrangement: CiELO, COUGAR	블랙 퍼퓸 (Black Perfume)	1,746	Santa
2	"Shut Off"	Lyrics: MADEWELL (AVEC), Heeyeon (AVEC), Bull$EyE (AVEC); Composition: MADEWELL (AVEC), Heeyeon (AVEC), LEY (AVEC); Arrangement: MADEWELL (AVEC)	SWITCH (스위치)	2,282	Hong Seong-min
2	"Shut Off"	Lyrics: MADEWELL (AVEC), Heeyeon (AVEC), Bull$EyE (AVEC); Composition: MADEWELL (AVEC), Heeyeon (AVEC), LEY (AVEC); Arrangement: MADEWELL (AVEC)	SWITCH (스위치)	2,282	Ling Qi
2	"Shut Off"	Lyrics: MADEWELL (AVEC), Heeyeon (AVEC), Bull$EyE (AVEC); Composition: MADEWELL (AVEC), Heeyeon (AVEC), LEY (AVEC); Arrangement: MADEWELL (AVEC)	SWITCH (스위치)	2,282	Kang Min-seo
2	"Shut Off"	Lyrics: MADEWELL (AVEC), Heeyeon (AVEC), Bull$EyE (AVEC); Composition: MADEWELL (AVEC), Heeyeon (AVEC), LEY (AVEC); Arrangement: MADEWELL (AVEC)	SWITCH (스위치)	2,282	K-Soul
2	"Shut Off"	Lyrics: MADEWELL (AVEC), Heeyeon (AVEC), Bull$EyE (AVEC); Composition: MADEWELL (AVEC), Heeyeon (AVEC), LEY (AVEC); Arrangement: MADEWELL (AVEC)	SWITCH (스위치)	2,282	Kaedan
2	"Shut Off"	Lyrics: MADEWELL (AVEC), Heeyeon (AVEC), Bull$EyE (AVEC); Composition: MADEWELL (AVEC), Heeyeon (AVEC), LEY (AVEC); Arrangement: MADEWELL (AVEC)	SWITCH (스위치)	2,282	Oh Hyeon-tae
2	"Shut Off"	Lyrics: MADEWELL (AVEC), Heeyeon (AVEC), Bull$EyE (AVEC); Composition: MADEWELL (AVEC), Heeyeon (AVEC), LEY (AVEC); Arrangement: MADEWELL (AVEC)	SWITCH (스위치)	2,282	Ha Seok-hee
