= Ryan Seaton =

Ryan Seaton may refer to:

- Ryan Seaton (singer) (born 1979), gospel singer
- Ryan Seaton (sailor), Northern Ireland-born sailor who competed at the 2012 Olympics
- Ryan Seaton, member of the band Callers
