= Global Music Diplomacy Initiative =

2023 U.S. diplomatic initiative

Video of U.S. Secretary of State Antony Blinken playing guitar at the launch of the Global Music Diplomacy Initiative

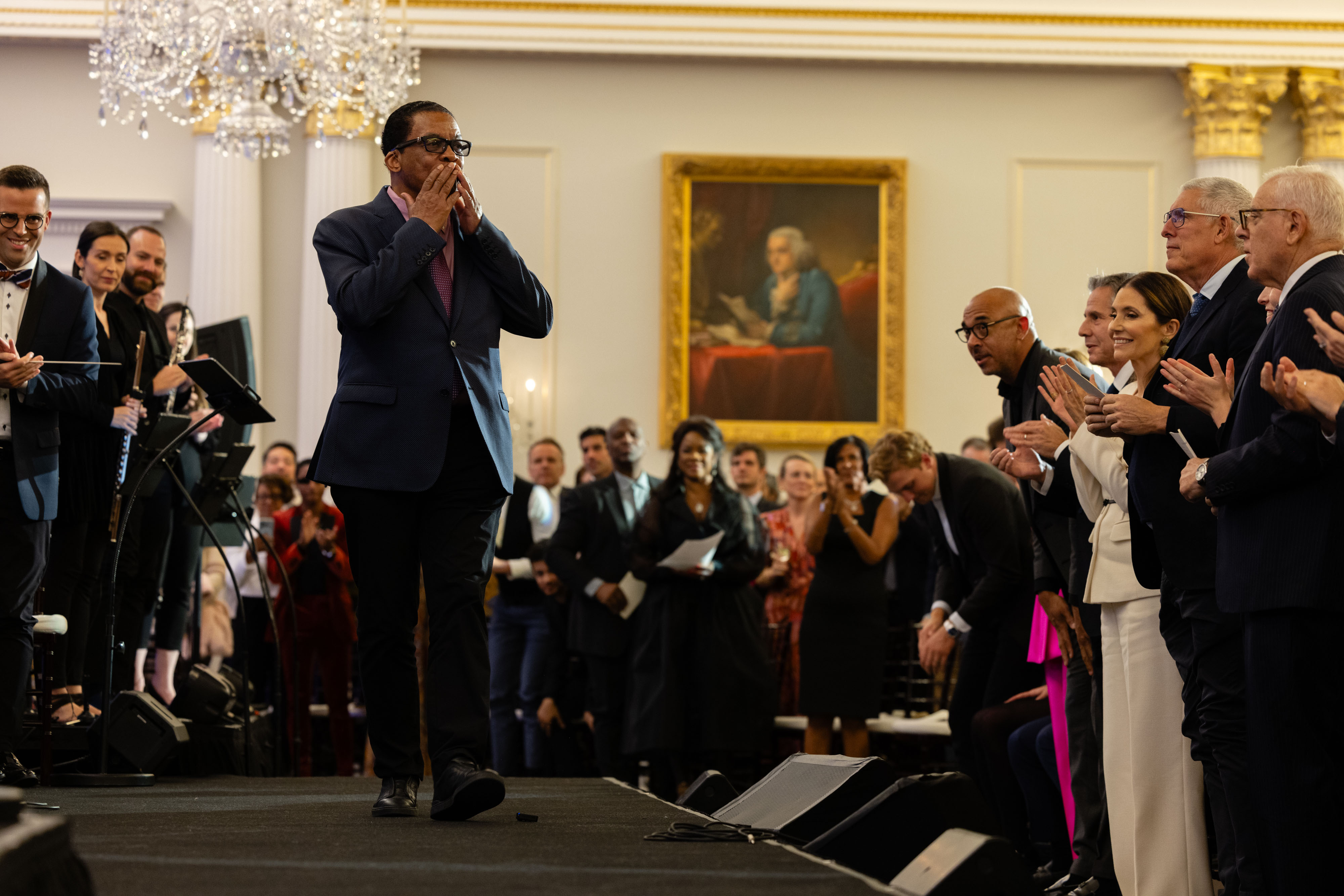
Musician Herbie Hancock performs at the launch of the Global Music Diplomacy Initiative

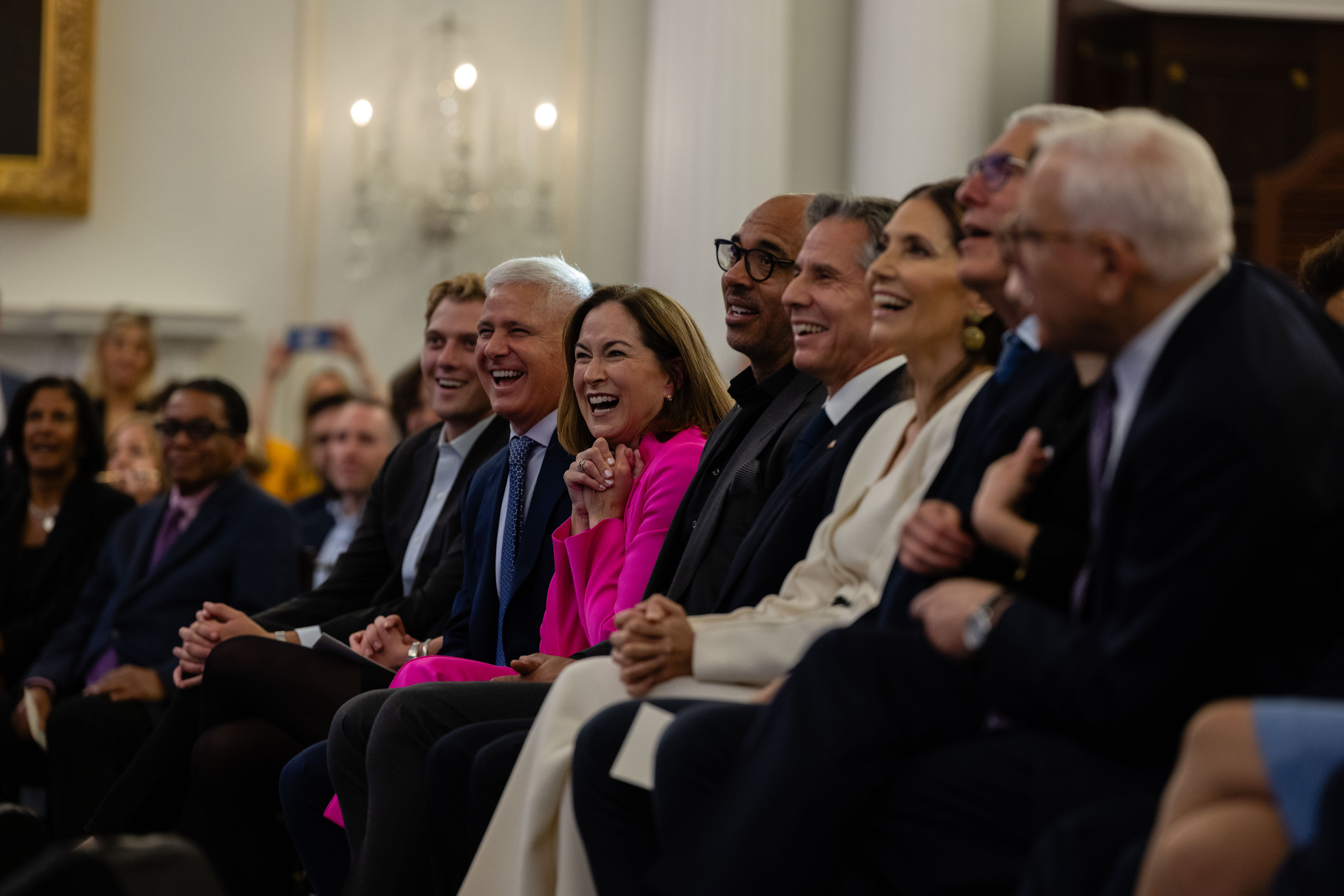
Blinken participates in the launch of the Global Music Diplomacy Initiative

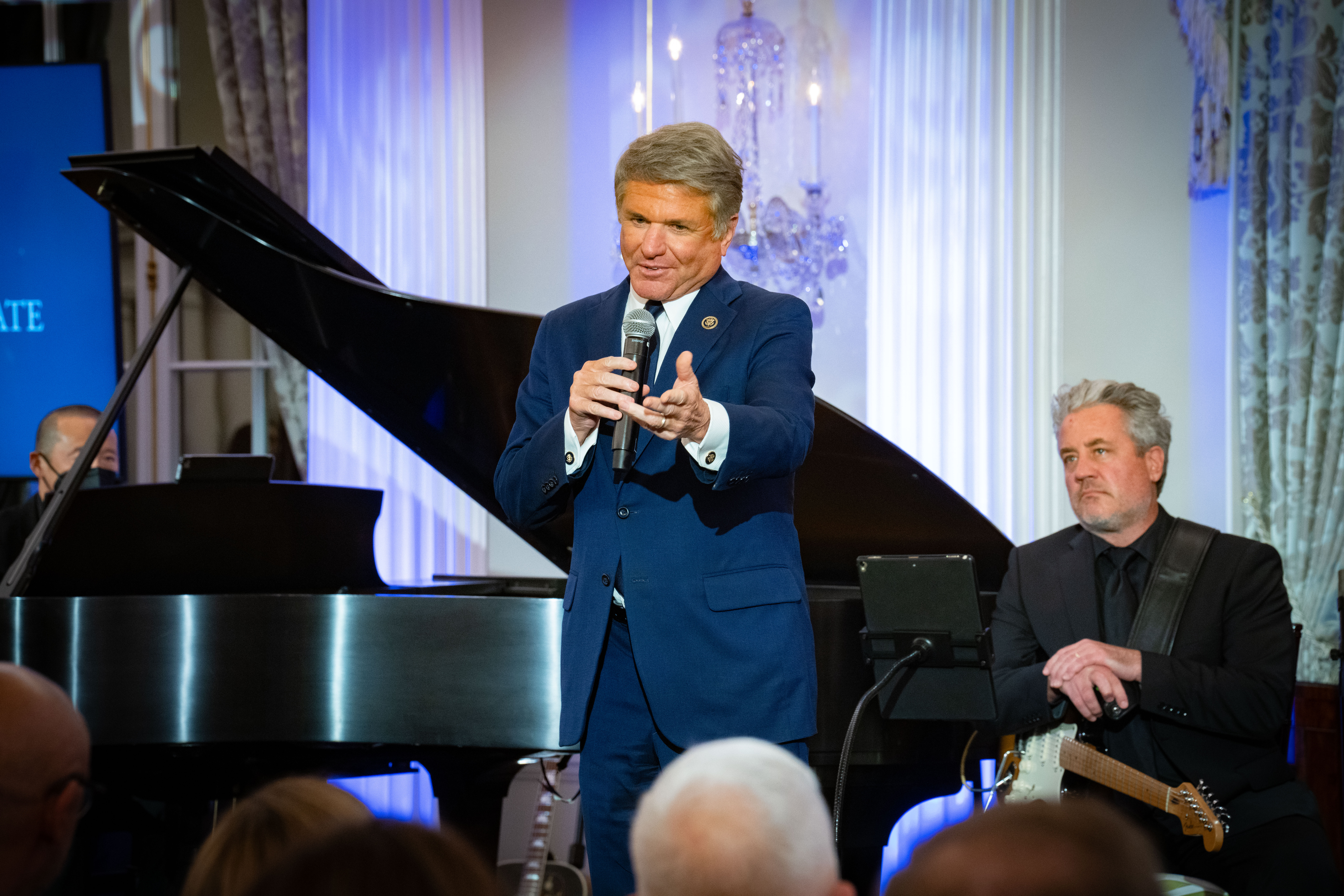
Congressman Michael McCaul performs during launch of the Global Music Diplomacy Initiative

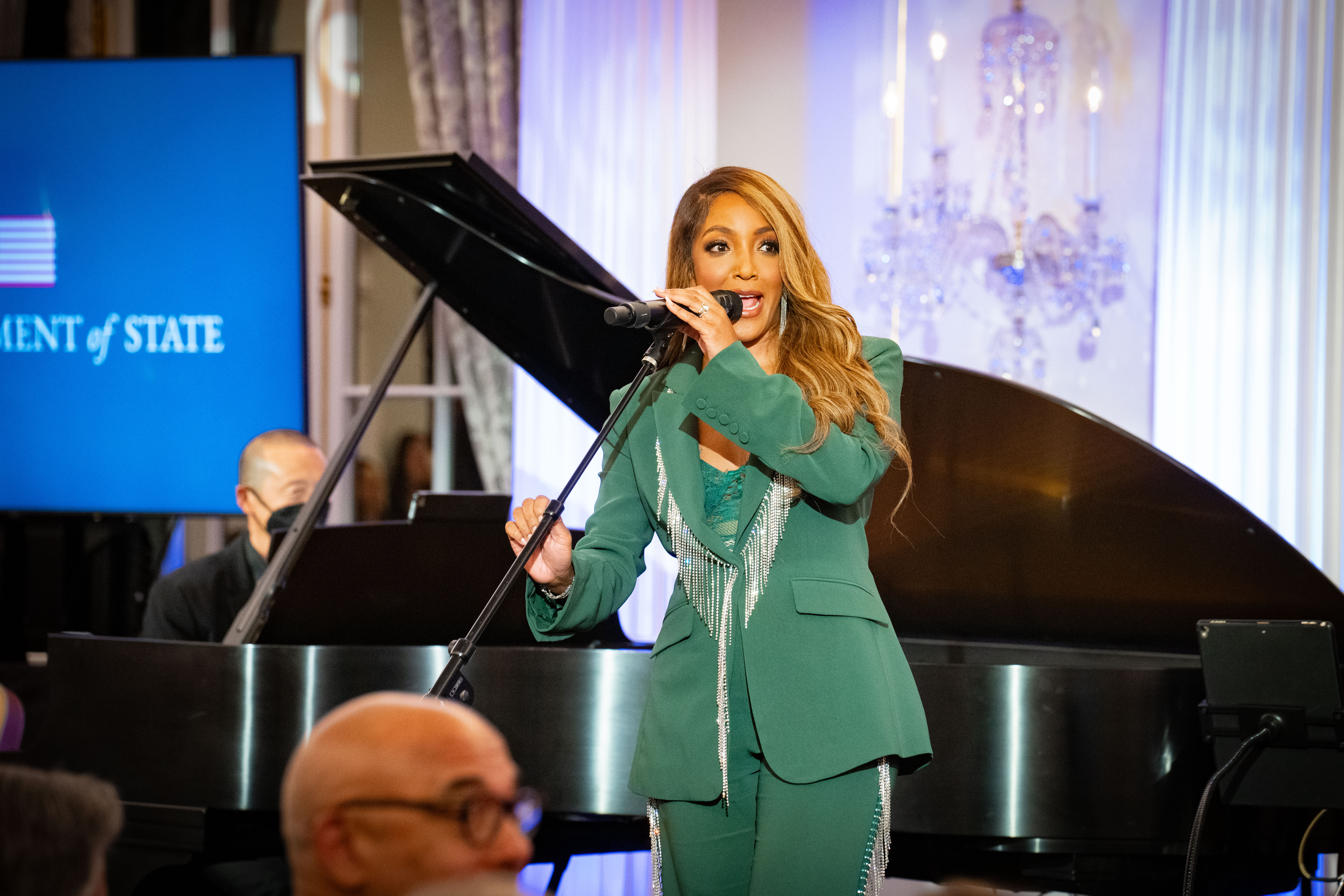
Musician Mickey Guyton performs during launch of the Global Music Diplomacy Initiative

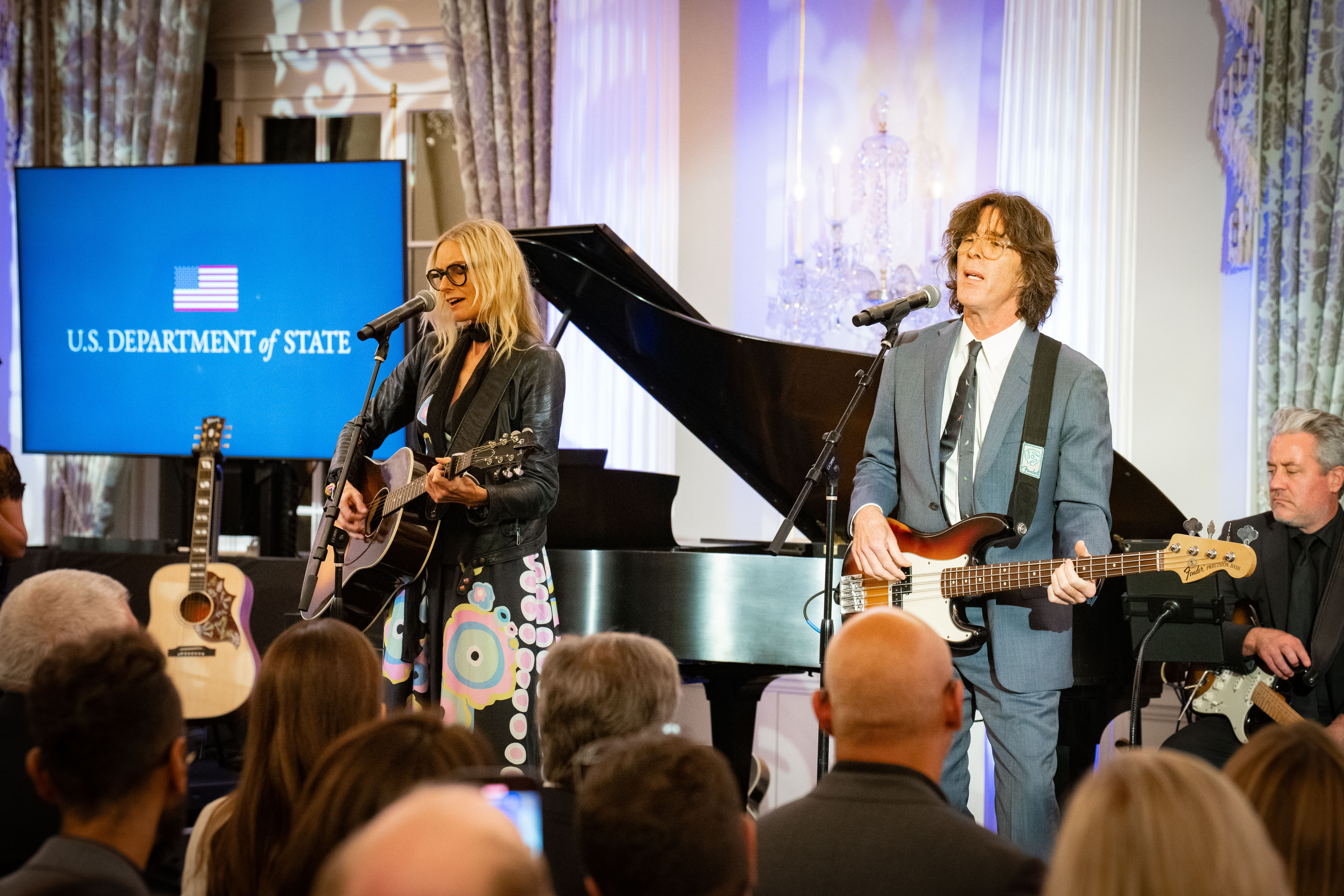
Music artist Aimee Mann performs during launch of the Global Music Diplomacy Initiative

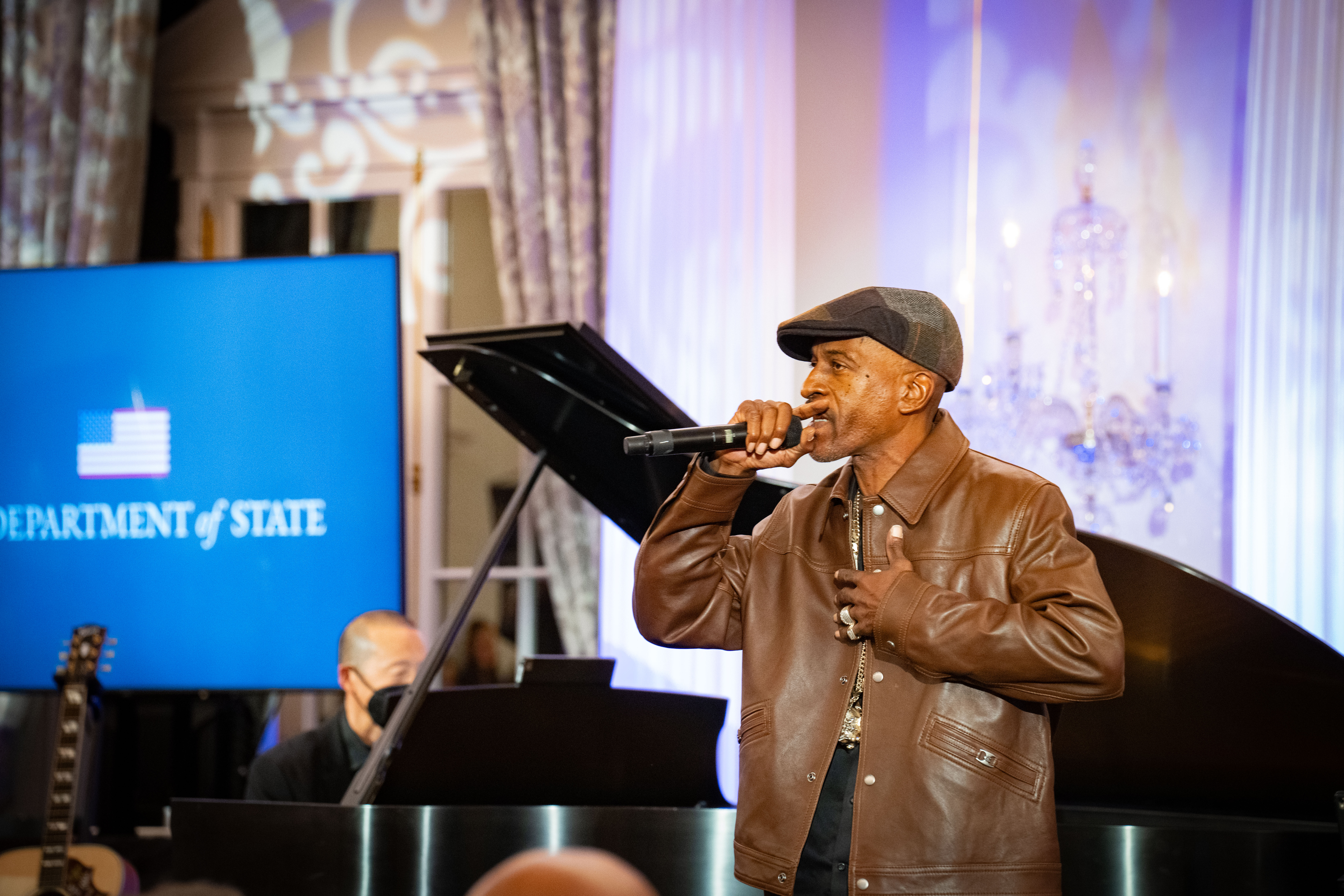
Music artist Rakim performs during launch of the Global Music Diplomacy Initiative

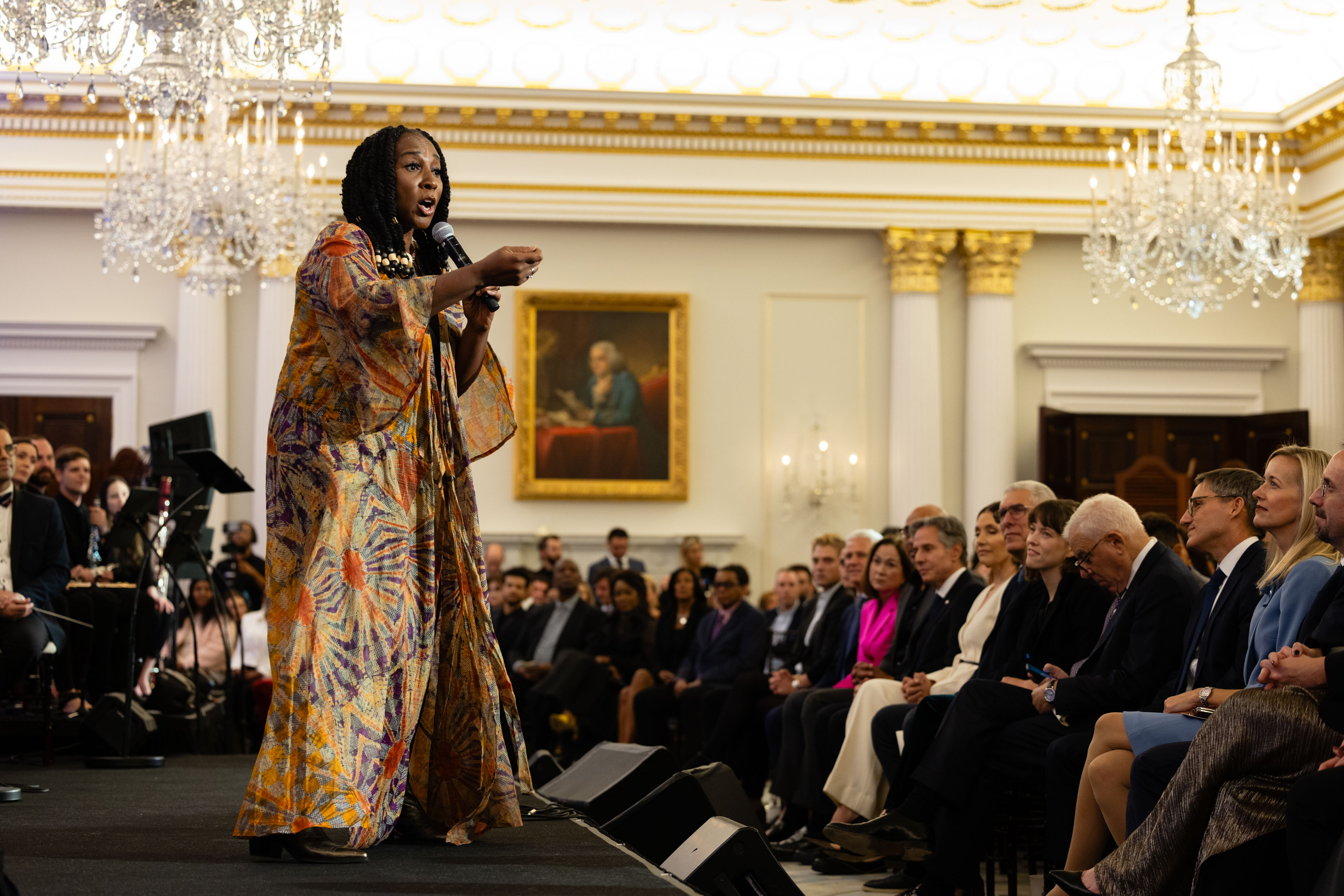
Musician Toni Blackman performs at the launch of the Global Music Diplomacy Initiative

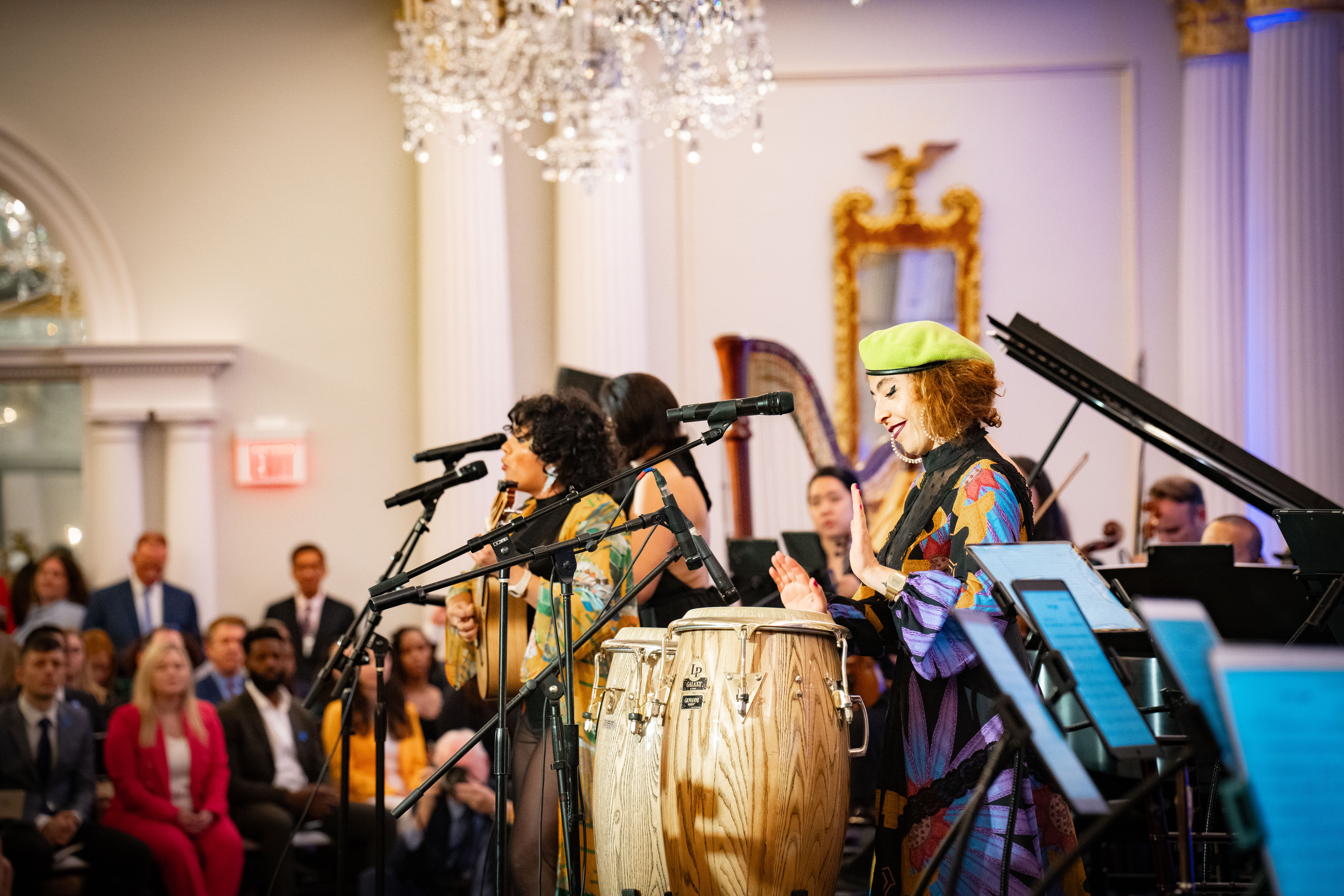
Musical group LADAMA perform during launch of the Global Music Diplomacy Initiative

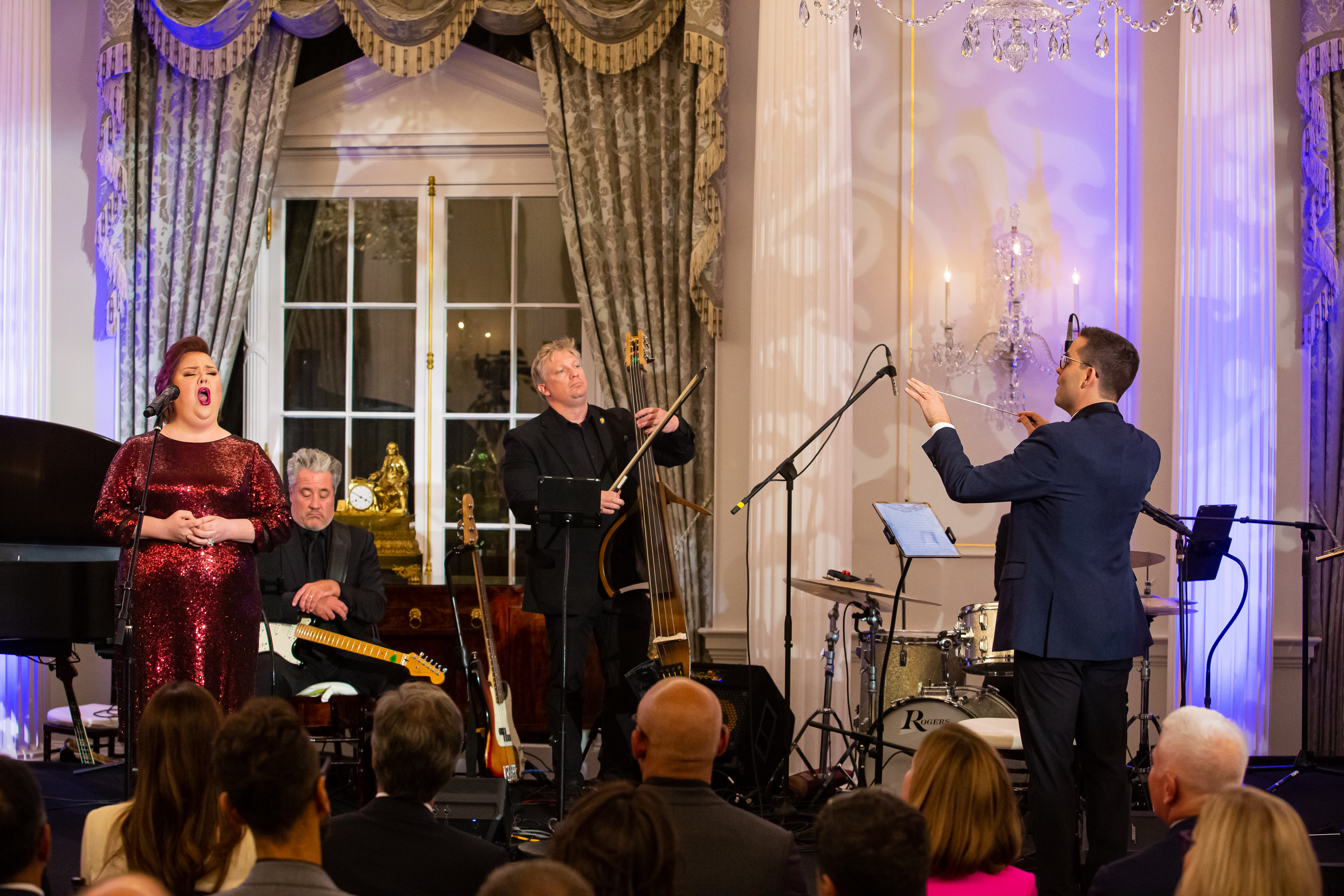
Musicians Jamie Barton and Luke Frazier perform at the launch of the Global Music Diplomacy Initiative

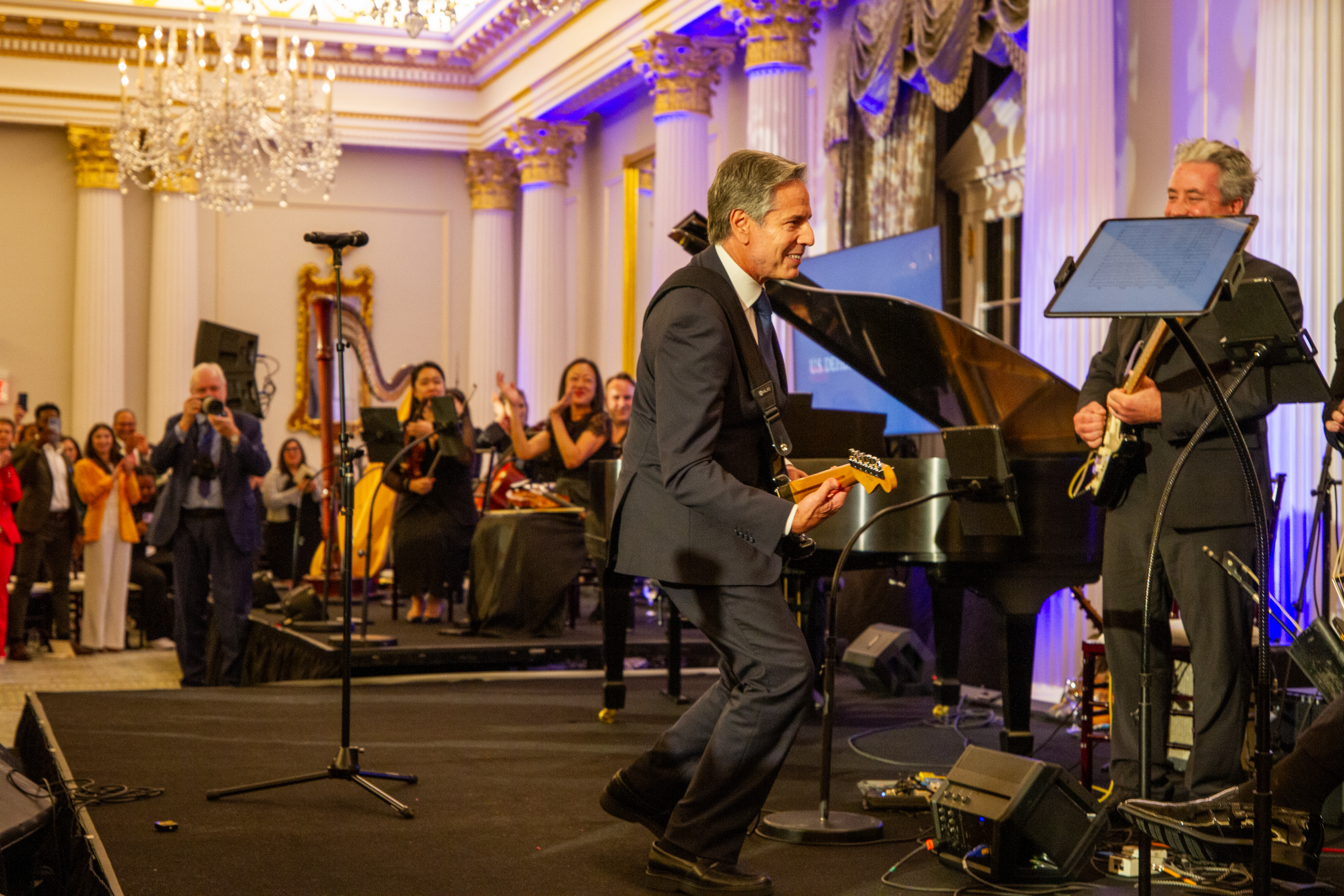
U.S. Secretary of State Antony Blinken performs at the launch of the Global Music Diplomacy Initiative

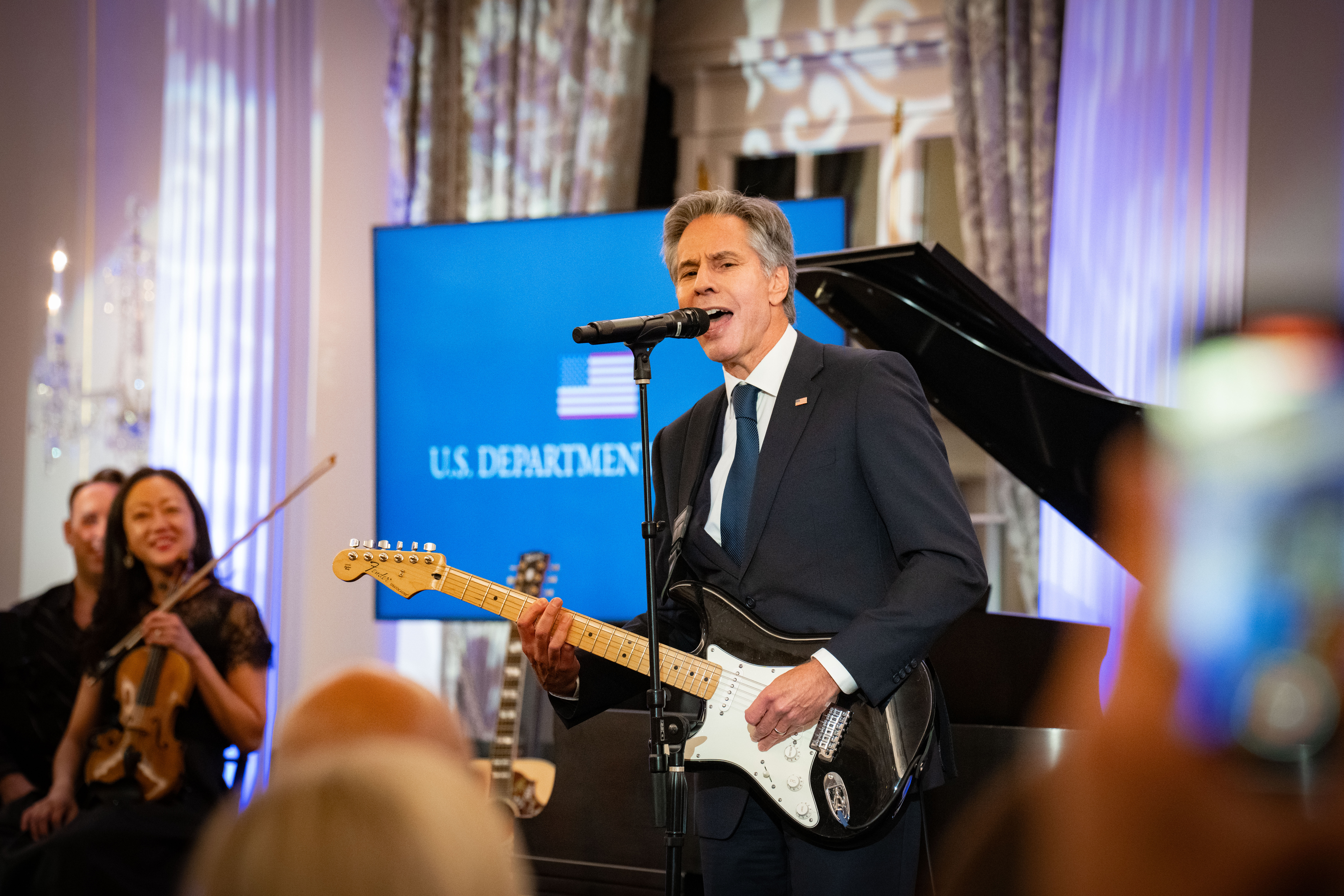
U.S. Secretary of State Antony Blinken performs during launch of the Global Music Diplomacy Initiative

The Global Music Diplomacy Initiative is a United States diplomatic initiative launched by Secretary of State Antony Blinken in partnership with The Recording Academy at the U.S. Department of State on September 27, 2023.

Modeled on Cold War–era U.S. jazz diplomacy, its stated mission is to "elevate music as a diplomatic tool to promote peace and democracy" while supporting U.S. foreign policy objectives. It leverages "current public diplomacy music programs to create public-private partnerships with American companies and non-profits to use music to... convey American leadership globally and create connections with people worldwide."

== Background ==
The Initiative was launched to enact the bipartisan Promoting Peace, Education, and Cultural Exchange (PEACE) Through Music Diplomacy Act, sponsored by Michael McCaul (R-TX) and Ted Deutch (D-FL) in the House of Representatives. A companion bill was introduced by Patrick Leahy (D-VT) and Thom Tillis (R-NC) in the Senate. It passed Congress and was signed into law by President Joe Biden as part of the National Defense Authorization Act for Fiscal Year 2023 in December 2022.

The Initiative came amid calls from senior diplomats (such as Tara Sonenshine) and think tank researchers (such as from the Atlantic Council) for the U.S. government to strategically strengthen its music diplomacy efforts, including through the implementation of new programs replicating the Cold War-era Jazz Ambassador initiative.

== Launch ==
Secretary of State Antony Blinken hosted the launch event, joined by Harvey Mason, Jr., Lyor Cohen, and David M. Rubenstein. Senior Biden administration officials, a bipartisan group of Members of Congress, leaders in the arts and humanities, and alumni from the State Department's music diplomacy exchange programs, were also in attendance.

The event featured live performances from Jamie Barton, Gayle, Dave Grohl, Mickey Guyton, Herbie Hancock, Christopher Jackson, Ladama, Aimee Mann, Rakim, and Armani White, among others. Blinken himself also performed "Hoochie Coochie Man" by Muddy Waters, the video of which went viral. Quincy Jones, a former Jazz Ambassador, received the inaugural Peace Through Music Award.

Announcements made at the event include a State Department–Recording Academy partnership for the American Music Mentorship Program, incorporation of music into U.S. investment in English-language learning abroad, and the Fulbright/Kennedy Center Visiting Scholar Award in Arts and Science.

The event was sponsored by YouTube, Chevron, Boeing, Wasserman Foundation, United Airlines, Adrienne Arsht, and John F.W. Rogers.

In an interview with the Associated Press, Blinken said: "I’ve always had a deep love for music in part because it has the potential to connect cultures and tell the American story around the world." He continued: "By launching this effort, we hope to expose a new generation of global audiences to what previous generations have found so compelling: our people and culture. We have no more powerful tools in our diplomatic toolkit, and I look forward to seeing—and listening to—the results of this initiative."

== Programming ==
As of December 2023, the Initiative's international programming includes American bands' travel to 30 countries (starting in October 2023), U.S. art envoys' travel to the Middle East and China (by the Philadelphia Orchestra; November 2023), and the Harmundi International Music Summit (November 2023).

In June 2024, a new partnership was announced between the State Department and YouTube to expand the Initiative's efforts. Chuck D, Grace Bowers, Breland, Kane Brown, Herbie Hancock, Denyce Graves, Jelly Roll, Teddy Swims, Justin Tranter, Armani White, and Lainey Wilson were named the inaugural U.S. Global Music Ambassadors.

== Reception ==
In an October 2023 opinion piece published in The New York Times discussing U.S.–China music diplomacy, Carla Dirlikov Canales, opera singer and senior adviser and envoy for cultural exchange at the National Endowment for the Arts, applauded the Initiative and expressed her hope that its programs can visit China. She wrote: "The relationship between the United States and China is typically looked at through the lenses of politics, trade and security, but the arts are also essential. They build bridges within—and between—societies. It’s why a single song can make the world a little better by helping us to collectively imagine a better future."

UC Davis distinguished professor of music Carol A. Hess said of the bipartisan support for the Initiative: "It’s interesting to see the range of politicians who support these programs."

In a piece for the Lowy Institute, researcher Kate Clayton argued that the Australian Government under Prime Minister Anthony Albanese should adopt a similar music diplomacy program that would function along with its Indo-Pacific strategy to further strengthen people-to-people and commercial ties.

== See also ==
- Public diplomacy
- Cultural diplomacy
- Soft power
- Foreign relations of the United States
