= Tom McDermott (musician) =

American pianist and composer (born 1957)

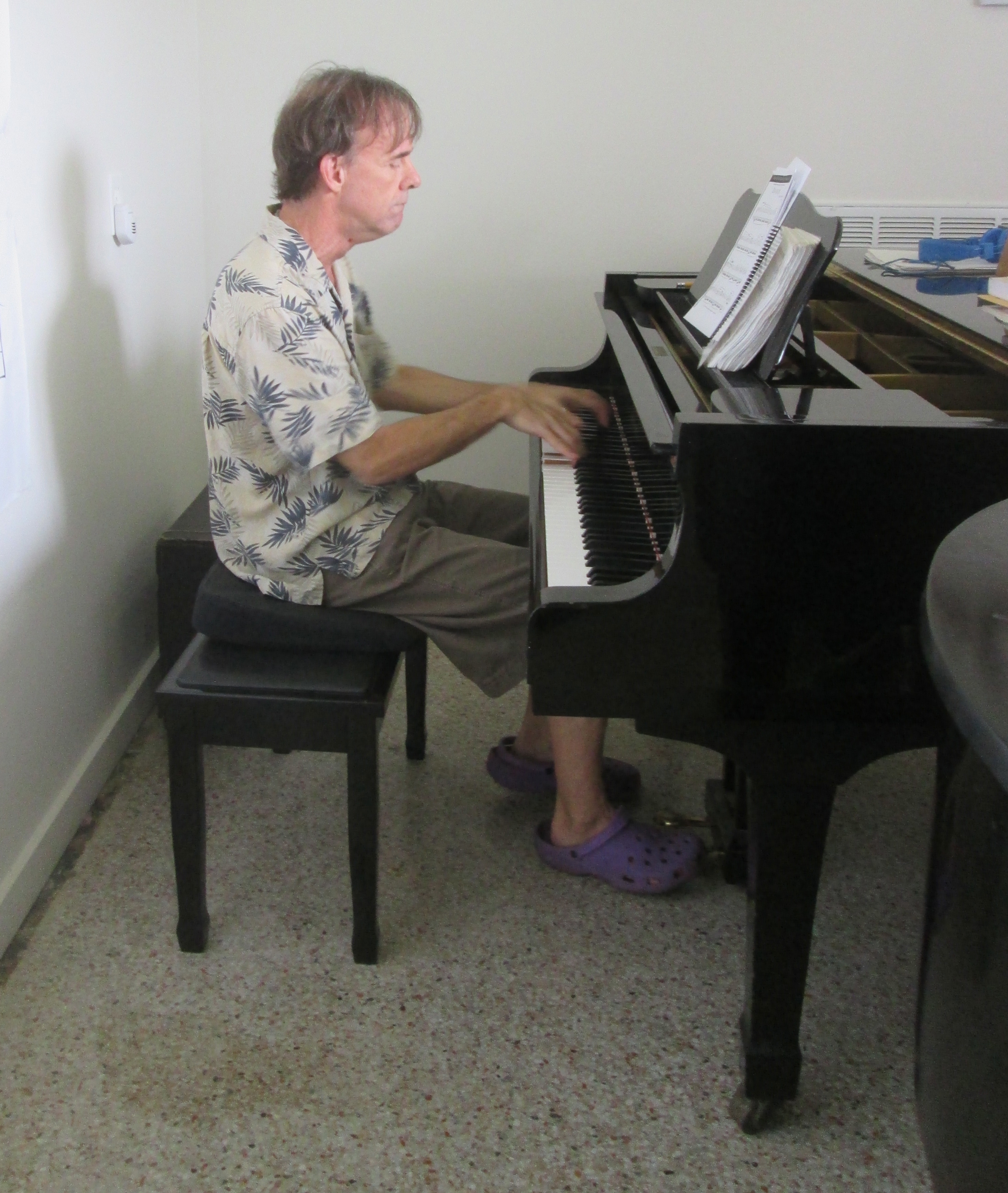
McDermott in 2015

Tom McDermott is a pianist and composer born in St. Louis, Missouri in 1957. He began studying piano at age seven, became a professional musician at 16, and received a Master of Music degree from Washington University in St. Louis in 1982. Two years later he moved to New Orleans and became noted for the styles of music associated with that town, especially traditional jazz and New Orleans R&B. He was in the group Dukes of Dixieland through much of the 1990s. In 1994 he co-founded and wrote arrangements for the innovative brass band the New Orleans Nightcrawlers. He has released 17 CDs as a leader, and has received praise from The New York Times, Rolling Stone, the Los Angeles Times and other publications. Since 2001 he has devoted much time travelling to Brazil, where he has studied and recorded choro music.

McDermott is also a journalist, writing primarily about music and travel. In 2017, Sagging Meniscus Press published "Five Lines, No Waiting", a book of his limericks and drawings.

== Discography ==
=== As leader ===
- All the Keys and Then Some (STR; reissued in 2008 by Parnassus)
- Louisanthology (STR)
- The Crave (STR)
- Danza (w/ clarinetist Evan Christopher) (STR)
- Choro do Norte (STR)
- Live in Paris (STR)
- Creole Nocturne (w/ cornetist Connie Jones) (Arbors)
- New Orleans Duets (Rabadash)
- Almost Native (w/ Evan Christopher) (Threadheads)
- Meschiya Lake and Tom McDermott (Chickie Wah Wah)
- Bamboula (Minky)
- Smiles (w/Kevin Clark; Viper)
- Temptation Rag (w/Kevin Clark; Viper)
- City of Timbres (w/Aurora Nealand) (OPM)
- Zeppelins Made to Order (w/ Chloe Feoranzo; Rabadash)
- Podge Hodge (Big Whinny Records)
- Tom McDermott Meets Scott Joplin (Arbors)
- Aurora Nealand and Tom McDermott, Live at Luthjens (Big Whinny Records)

=== As sideman ===
- New Orleans Nightcrawlers (Rounder)
- New Orleans Nightcrawlers: Funknicity (Rounder)
- New Orleans Nightcrawlers: Live at the Old Point
- Tim Laughlin: Isle of Orleans
- Matt Perrine: Sunflower City
- Irma Thomas: Simply Grand (Rounder)
- Debbie Davis: It's Not the Years It's the Miles (Threadheads)
- John Boutte: All About Everything
- Aurora Nealand and the Royal Roses: a Tribute to Sidney Bechet
- Patchwork: a Tribute to James Booker (STR)
- Loose Cattle: Seasonal Affective Disorder (Low Heat Records)
- Treme Soundtrack (Seasons 1 and 2)
