= Callers =

American indie rock band

- Origin: New Orleans, Louisiana, United States
- Genres: Alternative rock; indie rock; experimental rock
- Years active: 2004–present
- Labels: Western Vinyl; Partisan
- Members: Sara Lucas; Ryan Seaton
- Past members: Don Goodwin; Keith Souza; Seth Manchester
- Website: Twitter page

Callers is an American indie rock band composed of Sara Lucas and Ryan Seaton, later joined by Don Goodwin, Keith Souza, and Seth Manchester. The band crosses the genres of folk, blues, jazz, and experimental alt-rock.

== History ==
In 2004, Sara Lucas and Ryan Seaton met in New Orleans and started working together. They later moved to Providence, Rhode Island, where future album producers and bandmates Keith Souza and Seth Manchester run a studio called Machines with Magnets. A 2006 move brought them to Brooklyn, New York.

In 2008, they released the well-received Fortune, produced by Keith Souza. The spare instrumentation was enabled in part by Seaton's combining guitar and bass through the addition of a bass guitar string. 2009's touring included multiple dates supporting Western Vinyl label-mates Here We Go Magic.

In 2010, they recorded the more fully arranged Life of Love, by which time drummer Don Godwin had become a regular member of the group. They began playing many shows with Wye Oak in 2011.

In 2012, they released the album Reviver on Partisan to mainly good reviews. They continued touring with Wye Oak and then with Dirty Projectors. They also released the EP Further Out with fellow Western Vinyl artist Delicate Steve.

== Influences ==
Sara Lucas grew up singing from an early age in her native St. Louis, Missouri, especially gospel, blues, and jazz. "Heroes included Mahalia Jackson, Betty Carter, and Dinah Washington" (PopMatters interview). She has also studied classical guitar. Ryan Seaton's early interests ran more towards underground punk. He later studied classical saxophone in college, only picking up the guitar later.

== Related projects ==
Lucas co-founded the Latin alternative group LADAMA in 2014. She has also performed with Olga Bell and featured on Bell's album Tempo (2016). Ryan Seaton is a founder of the band Open House, along with Steven Reker (of People Get Ready), Eliot Krimsky, and Matt Evans.

== Discography ==
=== Albums ===
- Fortune (2008)
- Life of Love (2010)
- Reviver (2012)

=== Singles/EPs ===
- Further Out (2012) with Delicate Steve
