= Dosti Music Project =

The Dosti Music Project is an initiative of Found Sound Nation and the U.S. Embassy in Islamabad that ran from 2014 to 2016. The project brought together musicians from Pakistan, India and the United States for a month-long program to create and record music and then to showcase material on a short tour. Dosti translates to 'friendship' in both Urdu and Hindi, and represents the transcendence of political barriers that the program tries to promote through the musical collaboration. In 2017, Found Sound Nation released Travelers, a 12-track album compiled from the program.
