= Reviver (Callers album) =

Studio album by Callers
- Released: October 9, 2012
- Genre: Indie rock
- Length: 40:40
- Label: Partisan
- Producers: Callers; Keith Souza; Seth Manchester

Callers chronology
Live of Love (2010)	Reviver (2012)

Reviver is the third album by Callers.

== Reception ==
Professional ratings
Aggregate scores
Source	Rating
Metacritic	65/100
Review scores
Source	Rating
AllMusic	4/5 stars
Financial Times	3/5 stars
musicOMH	4/5 stars
Paste	(positive)
PopMatters	5/10
Uncut	7/10

Reviewers noted that the band had moved past the spare simplicity of their debut Fortune, but there was little consensus otherwise.

== Track listing ==
All songs written by Callers.

1. "Good Years" – 3:56
2. "Heroes" – 4:47
3. "Your Finest" – 3:27
4. "Crush Times" – 5:15
5. "Long Control" – 2:57
6. "Reviver" – 3:44
7. "Turning" – 5:55
8. "It's a Ringer" – 2:57
9. "Antenna" – 3:33
10. "Howard 2 Hands" – 4:09

== Personnel ==
- Sara Lucas – vocals, guitar
- Ryan Seaton – guitars, vocals, keyboards
- Don Goodwin – drums, percussion, Wurlitzer
