= Billie Eilish (song) =

Single by Armani White

from the EP Road to Casablanco
- Released: May 23, 2022
- Genre: Hip hop; pop rap; gangsta rap
- Length: 1:39
- Label: Legendbound; Def Jam
- Songwriters: Enoch Armani Tolbert; Greg Camp; Julio Angel Fernadez Jr.; Pharrell Williams; Victor Santiago
- Producer: July Da Producer

Armani White singles chronology
"Grateful" (2021)	"Billie Eilish" (2022)	"Diamond Dallas" (2022)

"Billie Eilish" (stylized as "BILLIE EILISH.") is a song by American rapper Armani White. It was released as a single on May 23, 2022 by Legendbound and Def Jam Recordings, and debuted at number 99 on the US Billboard Hot 100 in September 2022. This song’s title is derived from singer Billie Eilish. The song was released as the lead single from his extended play Road to Casablanco (2022). The music video references Eilish's album When We All Fall Asleep, Where Do We Go? (2019).

== Background ==
The song samples, "Nothin'" (2002) by N.O.R.E. (who also appeared on the official remix with Ludacris and Busta Rhymes). The song later appeared on White's extended play Road to Casablanco, which was released on May 5, 2023.

== Live performances ==
During the 2023 Osheaga Festival in Montreal, singer Billie Eilish, who is the song's namesake, invited White to perform the song on stage with her.

== Charts ==
=== Weekly charts ===
Weekly chart performance for "Billie Eilish"
Chart (2022)	Peak position
Australia (ARIA)	33
Austria (Ö3 Austria Top 40)	57
Canada (Canadian Hot 100)	45
Germany (GfK)	44
Global 200 (Billboard)	87
Greece International (IFPI)	43
Ireland (IRMA)	79
Netherlands (Single Tip)	23
Slovakia (Singles Digitál Top 100)	84
Switzerland (Schweizer Hitparade)	75
UK Singles (Official Charts)	65
UK Hip Hop/R&B (Official Charts)	28
US Billboard Hot 100	58
US Hot R&B/Hip-Hop Songs (Billboard)	18
US Pop Airplay (Billboard)	25
US Rhythmic (Billboard)	2

=== Year-end charts ===
2022 year-end chart performance for "Billie Eilish"
Chart (2022)	Position
US Hot R&B/Hip-Hop Songs (Billboard)	78

2023 year-end chart performance for "Billie Eilish"
Chart (2023)	Position
US Hot R&B/Hip-Hop Songs (Billboard)	89
US Rhythmic (Billboard)	40

== Certifications ==
Certifications for "Billie Eilish"
Region	Certification	Certified units/sales
Australia (ARIA)	4× Platinum	280,000^{‡}
Canada (Music Canada)	Platinum	80,000^{‡}
New Zealand (RMNZ)	Platinum	30,000^{‡}
Poland (ZPAV)	Platinum	50,000^{‡}
United Kingdom (BPI)	Silver	200,000^{‡}
United States (RIAA)	Gold	500,000^{‡}
^{‡} Sales+streaming figures based on certification alone.
