= People Get Ready (band) =

American indie rock band

- Origin: Brooklyn, New York
- Genres: Indie rock
- Label: Brassland Records
- Members: Steven Reker, Luke Fassano, James Rickman, and Jen Goma

People Get Ready is an American four-piece indie rock band based out of Brooklyn, New York. The band consists of Steven Reker, Luke Fassano (formerly of Yeasayer) James Rickman, and Jen Goma. They are known primarily for their live performances, which showcase a blend of rock show and performance art.

== History ==
After moving to New York from Arizona in 2006 and ultimately finding work as a musician, composer, and dancer on several large projects, founding member Steven Reker decided to pursue his own musical ventures. The band made its debut in 2009, and was later signed to Brassland Records. In 2011, they recorded their first album at a farmhouse turned studio in upstate New York, with help from fellow Brassland musician Jherek Bischoff. Following the release of their self-titled debut in 2012, they went on to tour throughout the United States and Europe, and received critical praise for their unique live show. They then began recording their second album, Physiques, in 2013, and released it on Brassland in June 2014.

== Discography ==
LP

- People Get Ready (2012)

- Physiques (2014)

EP

- Zelda Maria (2013)
