= Armani White =

American rapper (born 1996)

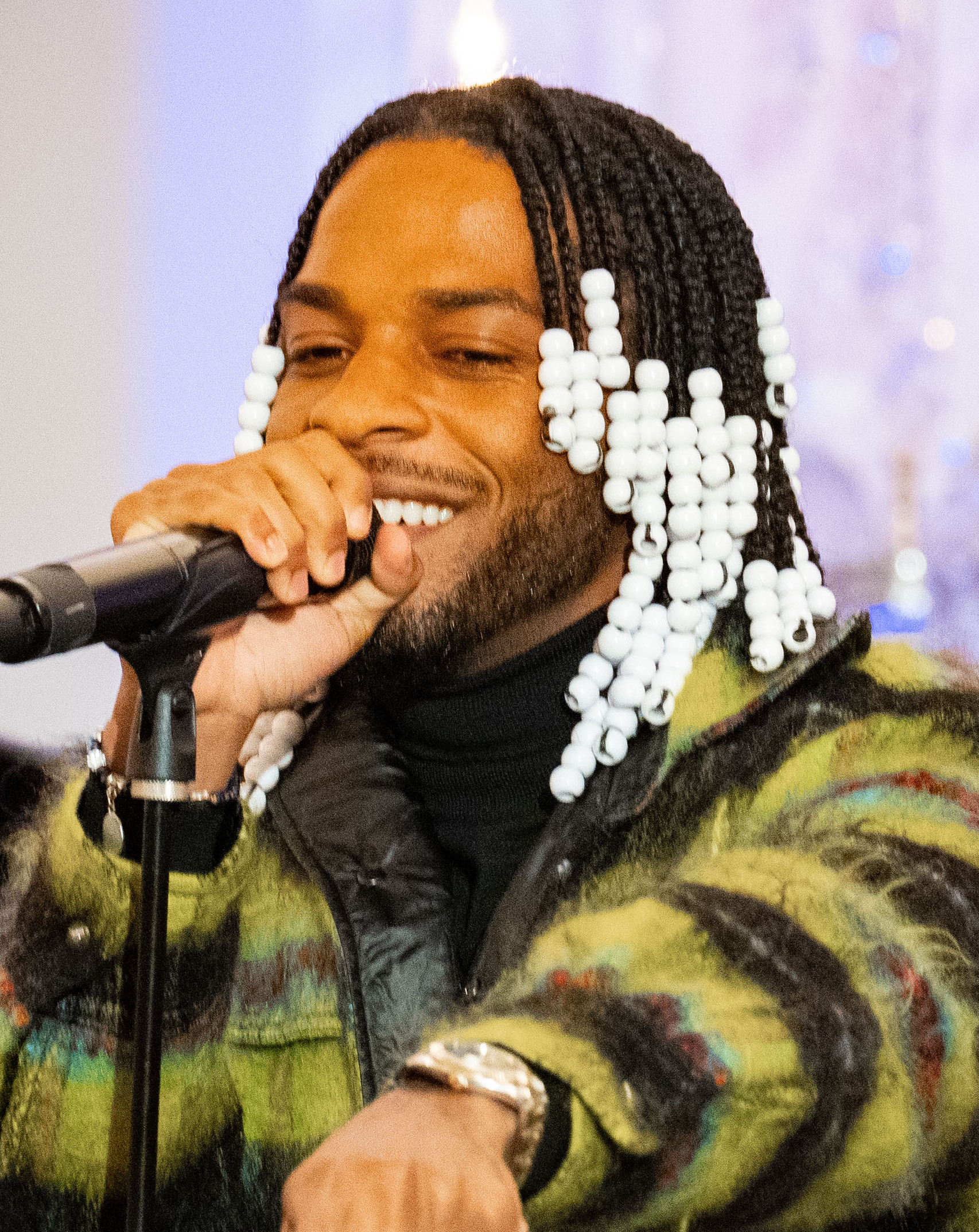
- White in 2023

Background information
- Also known as: Armani Blanco
- Born: Enoch Armani Tolbert; September 25, 1996 (age 30); Philadelphia, Pennsylvania, U.S.
- Genre: Hip hop
- Occupations: Rapper; singer; songwriter
- Years active: 2014–present
- Label: Def Jam (former)
- Website: awblanco.com

Enoch Armani Tolbert (born September 25, 1994),known professionally as Armani White, is an American rapper, singer, and songwriter. His 2022 single "Billie Eilish" peaked at number 58 on the Billboard Hot 100, and spawned a remix featuring rappers Ludacris, Busta Rhymes, and N.O.R.E. Prior to this, White was signed to Def Jam Recordings.

== Early life ==
During his childhood, White was surrounded by a family that played music which drew his attention towards a career in the music industry. He started rapping in the second grade.

He attended Philadelphia Electrical and Technology Charter School and later graduated from Smyrna High School in Delaware. Afterward, he enrolled in Rutgers University and later Delaware State University.

== Career ==
In 2014, White released an extended play on SoundCloud titled Hiding Out West. It would feature two songs.

White released his debut album Keep in Touch in 2019, which he says was inspired from the time spent with his late father.

He released an extended play entitled Things We Lost in the Fire on September 10, 2021.

On May 5, 2023, he released his major label debut EP, Road to Casablanco, after signing to Def Jam Recordings. The project featured his song "Billie Eilish" as well as a remix featuring Ludacris, Busta Rhymes, and N.O.R.E., alongside seven other tracks.

White became a U.S. Global Music Ambassador, part of a diplomacy program run by the U.S. Department of State, in 2024.

On January 26, 2025, White would perform his first NFL halftime show. It would be in the NFC Championship game between the Philadelphia Eagles and the Washington Commanders.

== Personal life ==
In 2016, White's father, Lee Tolbert, was diagnosed with prostate cancer. He died the same year.

In 2019, White and his brother were arrested for arson after a house fire erupted in their home in Philadelphia. They were sent to jail in early 2020. They were both released within a few months after the charges were dropped. The situation inspired White’s song “Letter from Jail (Freeblanco)” as well as his EP Things We Lost in the Fire.

== Discography ==
=== Albums ===
List of albums with selected details
Title	Details
Keep in Touch	Released: November 8, 2019; Label: Self-released; Formats: Digital download
There's a Ghost in My House	Released: October 31, 2025; Label: Def Jam, Legendbound; Formats: Streaming, digital download

=== Extended plays ===
Title	EP details
Things We Lost in the Fire	Released: September 10, 2019; Label: Legendbound; Format: Streaming, digital download
Road to Casablanco	Released: May 5, 2023; Label: Def Jam, Legendbound; Formats: Streaming, digital download

=== Singles ===
==== As lead artist ====
List of charting singles, with selected chart positions
Title	Year	Peak chart positions						Certifications	Album
Title	Year	US	AUS	CAN	GER	UK	WW	Certifications	Album
"NYC Window"	2017	-	-	-	-	-	-		Non-album single
"Public School"	2018	-	-	-	-	-	-		Keep in Touch
"Casablanco Freestyle" (featuring Sango)	2018	-	-	-	-	-	-		Non-album single
"Onederful"	2018	-	-	-	-	-	-		Keep in Touch
"Secret Handshake"	2019	-	-	-	-	-	-		Non-album singles
"Stick Up"	2019	-	-	-	-	-	-		Non-album singles
"Flip"	2019	-	-	-	-	-	-		Non-album singles
"Jasmine"	2019	-	-	-	-	-	-		Non-album singles
"Touche"	2019	-	-	-	-	-	-		Non-album singles
"Black Oak Park"	2019	-	-	-	-	-	-		Non-album singles
"2maro"	2019	-	-	-	-	-	-		Non-album singles
"Love, Dad"	2019	-	-	-	-	-	-		Non-album singles
"Thanksgiving"	2019	-	-	-	-	-	-		Non-album singles
"Letter from Jail (Freeblanco)"	2020	-	-	-	-	-	-		Non-album singles
"Danny Mac"	2020	-	-	-	-	-	-		Things We Lost in the Fire
"20 Dollar Christmas" (with Louis Futon and Mae.Sun)	2020	-	-	-	-	-	-		Non-album single
"Grateful"	2021		-	-	-	-	-		Things We Lost in the Fire
"Billie Eilish"	2022	58	33	45	44	65	87	RIAA: Gold; ARIA: 4× Platinum; MC: Platinum; BPI: Silver	Road to Casablanco
"Diamond Dallas"	2022	-	-	-	-	-	-		Non-album single
"Goated" (featuring Denzel Curry)	2023	-	-	-	-	-	-		Road to Casablanco and Madden NFL 24
"Gnarly" (with Jeleel)	2023	-	-	-	-	-	-		Non-album single
"Silver Tooth" (with ASAP Ferg)	2023	-	-	-	-	-	-		Road to Casablanco and Madden NFL 24
"Buckle Up" (with Philly Goats and PGS Spence)	2023	-	-	-	-	-	-		Non-album singles
"Shut Shit Down" (with TroyBoi)	2023	-	-	-	-	-	-		Non-album singles
"Breathe Freestyle"	2023	-	-	-	-	-	-		Non-album singles
"Million Cash" (with Connor Price)	2023	-	-	-	-	-	-		Non-album singles
"Ghost" (featuring Samara Cyn)	2025	-	-	-	-	-	-		Non-album singles

==== As featured artist ====
List of charting singles, with selected chart positions
Title	Year	Peak chart positions						Album
Title	Year	US	AUS	CAN	GER	UK	WW	Album
"Rewind" (Louis Futon featuring Ashe and Armani White)	2017	-	-	-	-	-	-	Non-album single
"Mexico" (Abhi the Nomad featuring Armani White)	2021	-	-	-	-	-	-	Abhi vs the Universe
"Baazigar" (Divine featuring Armani White)	2022	-	-	-	-	-	-	Gunehgar
"No Bad Days (Remix)" (Macklemore featuring Armani White and Collett)	2023	-	-	-	-	-	-	Non-album single
"Like That" (Corbyn Besson featuring Armani White)	2024	-	-	-	-	-	-	Non-album single
