= OneBeat (music program) =

Annual music exchange program

OneBeat in an annual international music exchange program that gathers musicians to share and collaborate on musical ideas and projects. The program was an initiative of the U.S. Department of State's Bureau of Educational and Cultural Affairs in partnership with and produced by Bang on a Can's Found Sound Nation.

The program selects around 25 musicians from hundreds of international applicants to participate in a two-week artist residency, where they experiment with sounds, record and produce tracks, and implement workshops through brainstorming with local educators, organizers, and entrepreneurs. These compositions and workshops are taken on the road for a two-week-long tour of performances, youth workshops and public music.

In addition to the U.S.-based program, OneBeat launched OneBeat Abroad hosted in partnership with global alumni, as well as OneBeat Virtual, OneBeat Institute and OneBeat Accelerator, a micro-granting program.
