= Fortune (Callers album) =

Studio album by Callers
- Released: 2008
- Genre: Indie rock
- Label: Western Vinyl
- Producer: Callers, Keith Souza

Callers chronology
Fortune (2008)	Life of Love (2010)

Fortune is the debut album of Callers, centered on Sara Lucas' vocals and Ryan Seaton's guitar playing. Sparely instrumented yet atmospheric, it combines elements of folk, blues, and jazz.

== Reception ==
Professional ratings
Review scores
Source	Rating
AllMusic	3.5/5 stars
Exclaim!	(positive)
NPR	(positive)
Pitchfork	7.8/10
PopMatters	7/10

The album received positive reviews, with critics highlighting Sara Lucas' voice.

== Track listing ==
1. "Valerie" – 1:32
2. "More Than Right " – 3:24
3. "Rone" – 4:40
4. "Fortune" – 3:13
5. "O Family" – 3:11
6. "Meet Between" – 3:15 (lyrics: Mike Taylor)
7. "Debris" – 3:42
8. "In Blighted Gold" – 1:28
9. "The Upper Lands" – 4:12
10. "Tied About" – 2:58
11. "Ste. Genevieve" – 2:35

== Personnel ==
- Sara Lucas – vocals, guitar
- Ryan Seaton – guitars, vocals, saxophone
- Gus Martin – drums, double base (tracks 2, 6, 7, 10)
- Don Goodwin – drums, tenor horn, trombone, tuba (tracks 4, 5, 9, 11)
