= Found Sound Nation =

New York-based music nonprofit organization. (2015–present)

- Formation: 2007; 19 years ago
- Founder: Chris Marianetti; Jeremy Thal
- Founded at: Brooklyn, New York, United States
- Website: foundsoundnation.org

Found Sound Nation (FSN) is a New York-based creative agency and nonprofit organization that uses music-making to connect people across cultural and societal divides. FSN is composed of musicians and artists who use collaborative sound-making as a tool of music diplomacy to help enhance communities and build bonds both locally and internationally.

== History ==
Found Sound Nation's work began in 2007 through an organizational partnership with Bang on a Can. Founders Chris Marianetti and Jeremy Thal began the work of FSN with music production and songwriting workshops at the Horizon Juvenile Center in the Bronx. The organization was incorporated as an 501(c)3 non-profit in 2015. In 2023, Jeremy Thal left Found Sound Nation to focus on music composition and production projects.

Found Sound Nation has organized numerous domestic and international workshops, performances, tours, and residencies.

== Notable projects ==
Found Sound Nation has been involved in a number of projects all over the world, with some of its largest being the annual international music diplomacy program OneBeat, a partnership with the U.S. Department of State's Bureau of Educational and Cultural Affairs (2012–2025), the Dosti Music Project, a partnership with the Embassy of the United States, Islamabad (2015–2016), Sound Bridge (2023–2024), a partnership with the Embassy of the United States, Yerevan, and the American Music Mentorship Program (2025), a partnership between the U.S. Department of State and The Recording Academy.

Found Sound Nation produced the short film Wall Piano (2020), which explores the dreams of children living near the Qalandia checkpoint in Ramallah, Palestine. The film has screened at international festivals including the Tampere Film Festival, the San Francisco International Film Festival, the Luciana Film Festival, and the Firenze Filmcorti Festival.

In 2024, Found Sound Nation produced Commercial, a multimedia musical work addressing themes of criminal justice, created in collaboration with writer and performer Dahlak Brathwaite. The piece premiered at The Public Theater. Commercial was awarded a 2025 Creative Capital grant and is currently under further development.

== Programming and works ==
Found Sound Nation's work falls under three major themes: Cultural Exchanges, Music & Conflict, and Public Works

=== Cultural Exchanges ===
==== OneBeat (2012–2025) ====
A collaboration with the United States Bureau of Education and Cultural Affairs, OneBeat's U.S. program brought together artists from around the world to the U.S. for a month-long residency and tour program. Other programs included OneBeat Abroad, a global offshoot featuring OneBeat Sahara, OneBeat Lebanon and other international editions.

=== Music & Conflict ===
==== Horizons Juvenile Center (2011) ====
In connection with Carnegie Hall's Musical Connections Program, Found Sound Nation led empowering music production workshops at Horizons Juvenile Center.

==== Dosti (2014–2016) ====
A collaboration with the United States Embassy in Pakistan, Dosti brought together eight musicians from Pakistan, India and the United States for a U.S. residency and tour.

==== Sound Bridge (2023–2024) ====
In collaboration with the Embassy of the United States, Yerevan, Sound Bridge united musicians from Armenia, Turkey, and Georgia for a creative and cultural exchange program. Since its inception in 2023, the program has brought together 24 artists from the Caucasus encouraging creative dialogue and mutual understanding through the medium of music and the sonic arts.

=== Public Works ===
==== APV India (2009) ====
Found Sound Nation's Chris Marianetti collaborated with students and teachers at Ashram Paryavarn Vidhyalaya School (APV) in the northern Indian Himalayan region of Uttarakhand to create soundscapes made from field and studio recordings.

==== Play Me I'm Yours (2010) ====
Found Sound Nation remixed and documented Luke Jerram’s public art project, Play Me I’m Yours, which placed pianos in public spaces around New York City.

==== Cine Institute (2012) ====
Found Sound Nation helped Haitian film students record and produce original music for their films and assisted them in creating a sound library for future use.

==== Lucerne Studio (2013) ====
Found Sound Nation set up a mobile ‘street studio’ to record and spontaneously compose music with musicians and passersby at the Lucerne Festival in Switzerland.

==== FSN Presents (2014–2017) ====
An ongoing genre bending concert series highlighting emerging artists and composers. A recurring program was hosted at Redhook's Pioneer Works.

==== Big Ears Festival (2014, 2015) ====
Found Sound Nation set up interactive Street Studios during Knoxville's annual Big Ears Festival.

==== Street Studio Cities (2015–2022) ====
Found Sound Nation partnered with producers from NYC to set up mobile “street studios” throughout the city. The producers engaged with passersby to spontaneously create improvised jam sessions that were later turned into full-length tracks and shared online. Street Studio Cities was sponsored by Harman International.
