= Fayt =

Fayt is a surname. Notable people with the surname include:

- Andrei Fayt (1903–1976), Soviet film actor
- Carlos Fayt (1918–2016), Argentine lawyer, politician, academic, and Supreme Court of Argentina justice
- François Fayt (born 1946), French composer

== See also ==
- Fayt-le-Franc, a village in the province of Hainaut, Belgium
- Fayt-lez-Manage, a town and a district in the province of Hainaut, Belgium
- Grand-Fayt, a commune in the Nord department in northern France
- Petit-Fayt, a commune in the Nord department in northern France
