= Rearguard Affair of Le Grand Fayt =

- Part of the Great Retreat on the Western Front of World War I
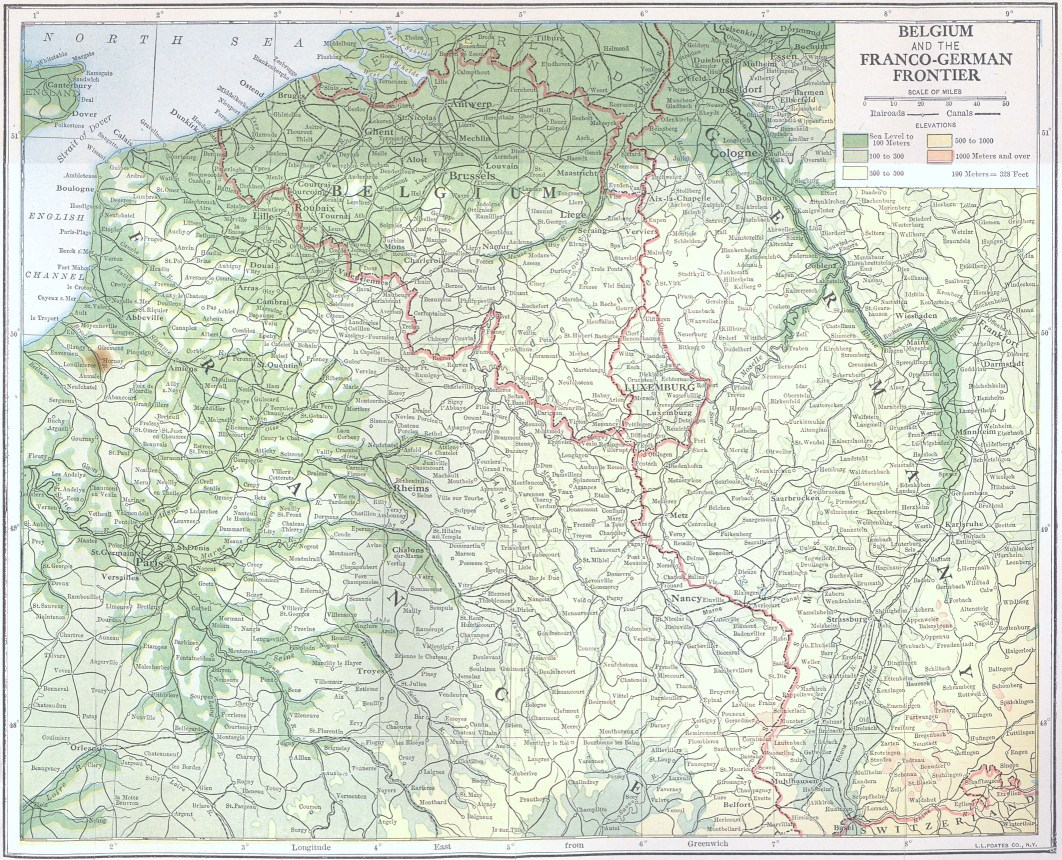
- Belgium and the Franco-German frontier, 1914
Date	26 August 1914
Location	Grand-Fayt, France 50°06′51″N 03°48′09″E
Result	German victory

Belligerents
United Kingdom	German Empire

Commanders and leaders
A. W. Abercrombie	Alexander von Kluck; Karl von Bülow

Strength
battalion	

Casualties and losses
6 officers and 280 men reported missing	
- a commune in the Nord department, northern France

The Rearguard Affair of Le Grand Fayt was a rearguard action fought at Grand-Fayt by the British Expeditionary Force's 2nd Division, during the Great Retreat on the Western Front in 1914.

The German 2nd Army commander General Karl von Bülow had ordered a rapid pursuit after the battles of 21–24 August against the French Fifth Army and the Expeditionary Force (EF). The 1st and 2nd armies were sent to the south-west to gain the left flank of the Allied line. The X Reserve Corps encountered "especially obstinate" resistance at Marbaix and Le Grand-Fayt. On the morning of the 26 August 1914, the 2nd Connaught Rangers under Lieutenant-Colonel A. W. Abercrombie covering the retreat of the British 5th Infantry Brigade from Petit Landrecies. Unknown to Abercrombie, by late morning the retreat had already taken place but the orders had not reached the Connaught Rangers.

Hearing the sound of rifle fire coming from near-by Marbaix, Abercrombie set off with two platoons of infantry in the direction Marbaix only to come under heavy artillery and machine-gun fire. Abercrombie then ordered his force to retire on Le Grand Fayt, which locals had told him was clear of Germans, only to discover that Le Grand Fayt had been abandoned. Abercrombie and his men then came under heavy fire from Germans concealed in the village, and the order was given to retreat through the surrounding fields. Despite the German small-arms fire and the difficulty of communication in the close terrain, the retreat was carried out in an orderly fashion, although 6 officers and 280 men were still missing on 29 August, including Abercrombie. By the evening the X Reserve Corps was still near Marbaix and Avesnes. The pursuit by the 2nd Army was ordered to continue on 27 August through Landrecies and Trélon, with the X Reserve Corps advancing towards Wassigny.
