= 2nd Infantry Division (United Kingdom) =

Former British Army unit

2nd Division; 2nd Infantry Division; 2nd Armoured Division
- Divisional insignia used from 1940, until the division was disbanded in 2012.
- Active: Raised and disbanded numerous times between 1809 and 2012
- Country: United Kingdom
- Branch: British Army
- Engagements: Crimean War; Siege of Sevastopol; Battle of Inkerman; Battle of the Great Redan; Second Boer War; Battle of Colenso; Battle of Vaal Krantz; Battle of the Tugela Heights; First World War; Western Front; Battle of Mons; Rearguard Affair of Le Grand Fayt; Rearguard Affair of Villers-Cotterêts; First Battle of the Marne; First Battle of the Aisne; First Battle of Ypres; Battle of Neuve Chapelle; Second Battle of Artois; Battle of Festubert; Battle of Loos; Defence of Vimy Ridge; Battle of the Somme; Battle of Delville Wood; Battle of Guillemont; Battle of Ancre; Attacks on Ancre; Drive on Hindenburg Line; Nivelle offensive; Battle of Arras; Battle of Arleux; Battle of the Scarpe; Battle of Cambrai (1917); Hundred Days Offensive; Second Battle of the Somme; Battle of Albert; Battle of Arras; Battle of Havrincourt; Battle of Canal du Nord; Second Battle of Cambrai; Battle of the Selle; Second World War; Western Front; Battle of Belgium; Battle of France; Le Paradis massacre; Battle of Dunkirk; Pacific War; Burma Campaign; Arakan Campaign; Battle of Kohima; Operation Capital; Battle of Meiktila and Mandalay; Operation Dracula

Insignia
- Identification symbol: Divisional insignia, during the First World War.

The 2nd Infantry Division was an infantry division of the British Army that was formed and disestablished numerous times between 1809 and 2012. It was raised by Lieutenant-General Arthur Wellesley for service in the Peninsular War (part of the Coalition Wars of the Napoleonic Wars) as the 2nd Division. It was disestablished in 1814, but re-formed the following year for service in the War of the Seventh Coalition. The formation fought at the Battle of Waterloo and played an important role in defeating the final French attack of the day. It then marched into France and became part of the Army of Occupation, and was the only British force allowed to march through Paris. In December 1818, the division was disbanded once again.

During the mid- to late-19th century, several formations bearing the name 2nd Division were formed. Only two such were considered part of the division's lineage by Everard Wyrall, who compiled its First World War history. The first was created in 1854 to take part in the Crimean War against the Russian Empire, fighting in the Battle of Inkerman and throughout the Siege of Sevastopol. In 1856, after the conclusion of hostilities, it was stood down. The second incarnation was raised in 1899 for the Second Boer War. It took part in all the battles that made up the Relief of Ladysmith, before advancing into Boer territory. At the end of 1900, when conventional warfare ended, the division was broken up so its forces could be reassigned to mobile columns or to garrison towns in an effort to combat the Boer guerrilla tactics.

The division was re-formed in 1902, but this time as a permanent formation and not on an ad hoc basis for a particular emergency. It was based at Aldershot, in southern England, before the First World War. In 1914 it was deployed to France a few weeks after the start of the war, as part of the British Expeditionary Force. The formation served on the Western Front and suffered heavy casualties. After the war, the division returned to Aldershot where it remained throughout the inter-war period. During the Second World War, the formation was again deployed to France in the opening stages of the conflict. In the subsequent Battle of France it was forced back to the port of Dunkirk and evacuated to the United Kingdom. It then served in Burma, and ended the war in British India. The division remained within the British order of battle in the post-war years, and formed part of the British Army of the Rhine in Germany. In 1976 the formation was transformed into the 2nd Armoured Division and maintained this role until the end of 1982. It was then disbanded in Germany, and the 2nd Division was re-formed in York, England, in 1983. Following the end of the Cold War and the decrease in the size of the British Army, it was again disbanded; only to be re-raised in the mid-1990s. At the turn of the millennium the division moved to Edinburgh, Scotland, and was most recently disbanded in 2012.

== Napoleonic Wars ==
=== Peninsular War ===
During the French Revolutionary Wars and early in the Napoleonic Wars, the brigade was largest organised formation used by the British Army during campaigns. These consisted of two or more battalions grouped together under the command of a major-general, and suited the small size of the army and the operations it conducted. When needed, larger forces were assembled on an ad hoc basis; these included multiple brigades that were grouped into "lines" or "columns". As the army and its operations grew, it implemented divisions—a single formation of two or more brigades that was usually commanded by a lieutenant-general. The division concept was not new and had been used by other European armies towards the end of the Seven Years' War (1756–1763). On 18 June 1809 Lieutenant-General Arthur Wellesley, commander of British forces in Spain and Portugal during the Peninsular War, reorganised his force into four divisions: the 1st, the 2nd, the 3rd, and the 4th.

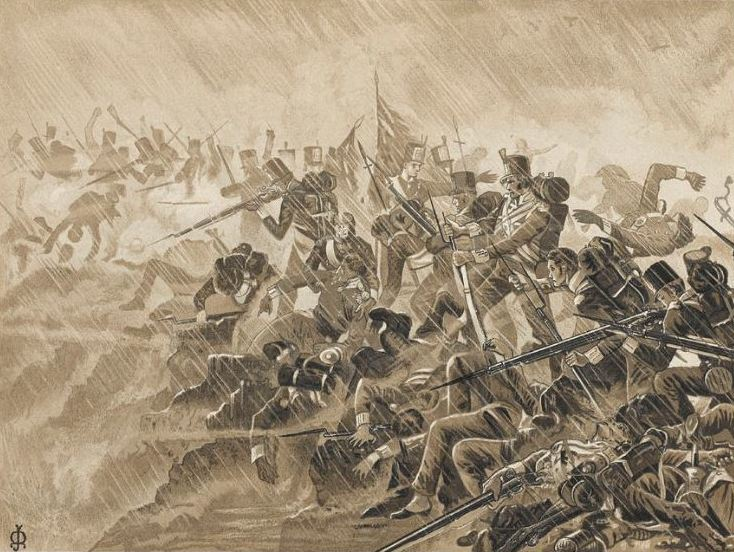
An illustration by J. Marshman depicting the division's 1st Battalion, 57th (the West Middlesex) Regiment of Foot during the Battle of Albuera

Major-General Rowland Hill was given command of the newly formed 2nd Division, which was around 3,900 men strong. It first saw action at the Battle of Talavera (27–28 July 1809), and suffered 888 casualties over two days of fighting. (Note: Ian Fletcher, a historian, suggested the division was formed in May 1809, and fought at the Second Battle of Porto. Charles Oman, a historian of the Peninsular War, detailed the British order of battle at Porto, and noted the entire force comprised eight brigades and no divisions. Oman stated that it was after that battle, when divisions were formed. Philip Haythornthwaite, a historian, stated that the divisions were formed on 18 June 1809.) The division, now 10,000-strong and including embedded Portuguese troops, was present at the Battle of Bussaco on 27 September 1810 but did not see combat. By October it was manning redoubts in the Torres Vedra defensive line, near Alhandra. While French forces skirmished with the division's pickets, the main position was not engaged. In November, Hill, who was suffering from fever, was replaced by Major-General William Stewart; one of the division's brigade commanders. Detached from Wellesley's main force, the division missed most of the major battles during the 1811–12 period and acquired the nickname the "Observing Division". Despite this, the division was involved in several battles during that period. At the Battle of Albuera Stewart received criticism for his handling of the division and ignoring orders. As the division moved to take position alongside engaged Spanish forces, Stewart ordered his lead brigade to strike the flank of the attacking French. Stewart ignored a request by the brigade commander to establish his own flank guard, thus leaving it vulnerable. While the brigade was engaged in this manoeuvre, and concealed by a blinding hailstorm, 800 Polish lancers had approached the brigade's open flank. The lancers charged into the British flank, inflicting 1,248 casualties, or 75 per cent of the brigade's strength. The total divisional losses in the battle amounted to 2,868. On 28 October 1811 the division – with attached Spanish cavalry – took part in the Battle of Arroyo dos Molinos, where it captured Arroyo dos Molinos, scattered the garrison and took around 1,300 prisoners with a loss of 101 men. On 19 May 1812, at the Battle of Almaraz, 900 men of the division entered Fort Napoleon by surprise. After a fierce, closely fought battle they forced the garrison to retreat. The fort's guns were used to subdue the garrison of nearby Fort Ragusa, which the division occupied, and then secured an important river crossing over the Tagus. The fighting resulted in around 400 French casualties, and the division suffered 189 casualties including 37 killed. In late 1812, while it covered the retreat of coalition forces, the division failed to fully destroy a bridge. This allowed French forces to cross the Tagus faster than anticipated.

The following year, on 21 June, the division fought at the Battle of Vitoria, where it formed part of the British right flank and suffered 1,110 casualties. In July the division briefly took part in the Siege of Pamplona, before it fought numerous engagements during the Battle of the Pyrenees. The most notable was the Battle of Maya. During the morning of 25 July 1813 French forces attacked to the south of the division's position. This attracted Stewart's attention, and he left to investigate without leaving instructions or informing anyone where he had gone. Oman wrote Stewart "must also be given the discredit of the very inadequate arrangements that had been made for the defence" of the Maya pass. French troops, who had made use of the terrain, advanced undetected towards the division, attacked, and overran five light infantry companies. The division then conducted several piecemeal counter-attacks. In the afternoon Stewart returned and organised a withdrawal to a new position, fended off new attacks, and ended the day in a strong position that blocked the pass despite having lost possession of it. Despite this, Stewart was ordered to withdraw after dark by Hill, who was now his corps commander. The fighting resulted in the division suffering 1,320 casualties, which also included Stewart who was wounded. Over the rest of July and into August, the division lost a further 516 casualties. (Note: A separate 2nd Division, under the command of Major-General John Mackenzie, operated during this period as part of Lieutenant-General John Murray's independent Army on the Tarragona.) The division next defended the Pyrenees passes at Roncesvalles over the following months, before it fought in several engagements during the advance into France. These included the Battle of Nivelle, a bloody engagement at Saint Pierre that cost 903 casualties, and fighting at Orthez and Aire-sur-l'Adour with relatively few casualties. The division played no further major role in the campaign, which concluded after the capture of Toulouse on 12 April 1814. Meanwhile, Napoleon, Emperor of the French, had abdicated following the capture of Paris on 31 March. With the War of the Sixth Coalition over, the division was broken up. The troops marched to Bordeaux, where they either returned to the United Kingdom or were transported to North America to take part in the ongoing War of 1812.

=== Waterloo ===
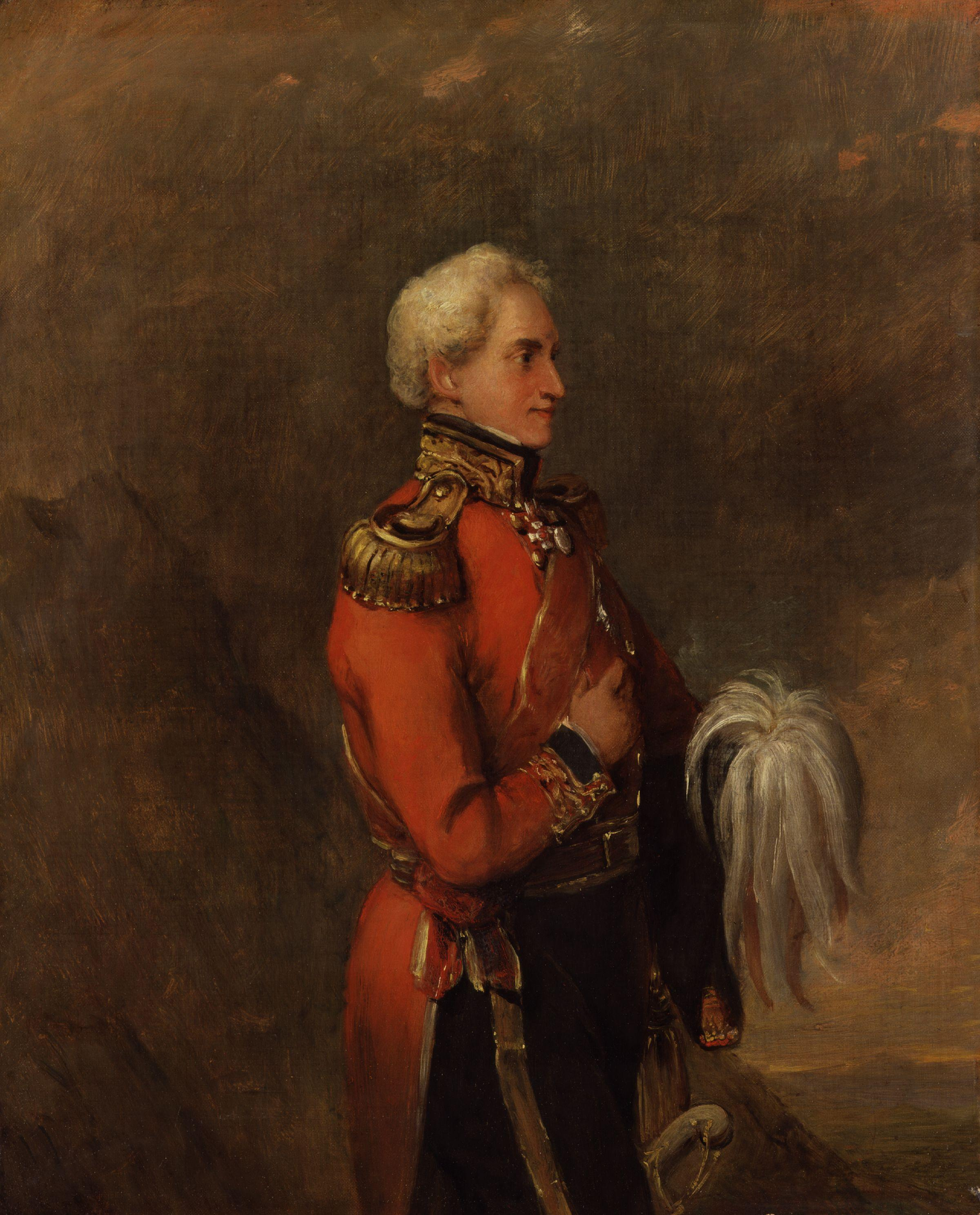
A portrait of Frederick Adam, commander of the division's light brigade during the Battle of Waterloo, by William Salter

At the end of the war, British and Hanoverian troops moved into the Southern Netherlands (previously Austrian Netherlands), as part of an Anglo-Dutch effort to secure the territory while they awaited a political outcome at the Congress of Vienna. Lieutenant-General Sir Henry Clinton arrived in late 1814 to command and train these forces. On 11 April 1815, after the outbreak of the War of the Seventh Coalition upon Napoleon's return to power, elements of this force became the 2nd Division under Clinton's command. This force comprised one brigade of British light infantry and riflemen, one brigade of the King's German Legion (KGL) – a British unit consisting mainly of expatriate German troops, and one brigade of recently raised Hanoverian Landwehr.

At the Battle of Waterloo, on 18 June 1815, the division formed part of Hill's 2nd Corps. The division's 6,450 men started the day in reserve and protected the right flank of the British position. During the afternoon, when French skirmishers attacked British cannons, the division's light infantry brigade – under the command of Major-General Frederick Adam – moved forward to drive them back and protect the guns. Afterwards, it and the KGL brigade advanced to a position behind Château d'Hougoumont, an important tactical strongpoint in front of the British line. Formed into infantry squares and under fire from French skirmishers, the brigades assisted in the château's defence, and fired at French cavalry attacking other British forces. The KGL brigade also fended off several direct cavalry attacks. Around 19:30 the final French attack began when the Imperial Guard's Middle Guard advanced on the British right flank and engaged the British Foot Guard regiments. Adam responded by wheeling his brigade left into a line to face the French flank. His troops, particularly the 52nd (Oxfordshire) Regiment of Foot, fired volleys into the French in a fierce firefight, and then charged. This, in conjunction with the resistance of the British foot guards, halted the French attack and caused the Middle Guard to retreat. With Hanoverian troops covering their flank, Adam's brigade advanced after the French before a general advance by the Anglo–Dutch army. With the French in retreat, the Hanoverian and KGL troops cleared the woods around the Château d'Hougoumont, while other elements of the Hanoverian brigade advanced. Adam's brigade, with one Hanoverian battalion in support, advanced towards the La Belle Alliance inn, the centre of the French position. Near the inn, Imperial Guard units, including elements of the Old Guard, had formed a square as a rearguard. Adam's troops engaged them and forced them to retreat. They halted at dusk, which heralded the close of the battle, during which the division had suffered 1,563 casualties.

Following the battle, the division marched into France with the rest of the coalition force. It arrived at Saint-Denis, on the outskirts of Paris, on 1 July. Six days later, Adam's brigade entered Paris and marched along the Champs-Élysées, the only British troops to enter the capital. In October the Army of Occupation was formed and included the 2nd Division. By the end of the year the German elements of the division had left, and a newly formed British brigade had replaced them. Clinton remained in command of the division until it and the Army of Occupation were disbanded in December 1818, when they left France for the UK.

== Victorian Era ==
Everard Wyrall, the official historian of the 2nd Division during the First World War, described the division's lineage as including the Peninsular War, the Battle of Waterloo, the Crimean War, and the Second Boer War. Outside of this lineage, other 2nd Divisions were raised during the 19th century, each on an ad hoc basis. A 1,250-strong 2nd Division was organised in 1851 under Colonel George Mackinnon, during the Eighth Xhosa War. In 1857 an expeditionary force was formed from the Indian Army for service in the Second Opium War. The force contained a 2nd Division, which was under the command of Major-General Robert Napier. Major-General George Jackson Carey took command of a 2nd Division, which was around 10,000 men strong and had been formed in September 1871 solely for training manoeuvres in England. In 1879 Major-General Edward Newdegate commanded a 2nd Division during the Anglo-Zulu War. (Note: Frances Colenso wrote that at the end of April the division, referred to as No. 2 or the Second Division, consisted of 10,238 British, colonial, and African troops. Louis Creswicke stated at the Battle of Ulundi the division consisted of 1,870 Europeans and 530 African soldiers.) During the 1882 Anglo-Egyptian War, Lieutenant-General Edward Bruce Hamley commanded another newly established 2nd Division.

=== Crimean War ===
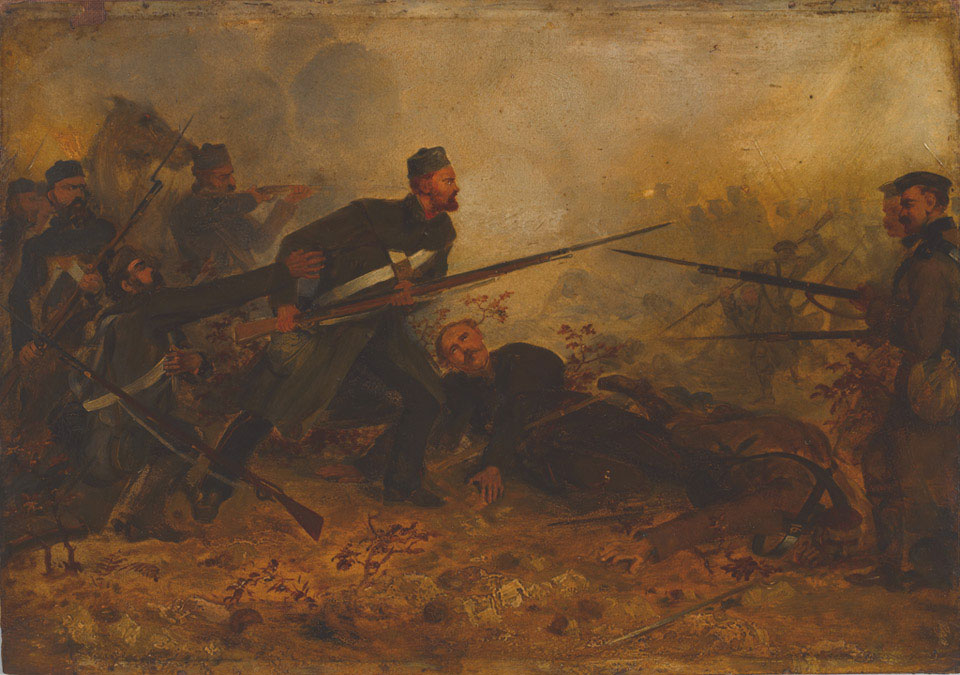
A depiction of Private John McDermond saving his commanding officer, Colonel William O'Grady Haly, during the Battle of Inkerman by Louis William Desanges. This action resulted in McDermond's being awarded the Victoria Cross.

On 28 March 1854, in support of the Ottoman Empire, the British and the Second French Empire declared war on the Russian Empire. Anglo-French forces landed at Gallipoli, to be in a position to defend Constantinople if needed. In mid-June the British force advanced to Varna, on the Black Sea coast of Ottoman Bulgaria. At Varna they were reorganised into divisions, and the expeditionary force suffered from a cholera outbreak. Sir George de Lacy Evans was given command of the division, which was around 3,500 men strong, on 20 June. Clive Ponting, a historian, described him as "the only British commander with even the remotest experience of European war", based on his service in the Peninsular War and Spanish Carlist Wars of the 1830s. During this period, British strategic policy was to destroy the Russian Black Sea Fleet based at Sevastopol to end the war and carry out long-term British goals. The French also adopted this immediate goal.

On 14 September the Anglo-French expeditionary landed north of Sevastopol. They marched south and encountered the Russians at the Alma River, which blocked further progress. Communication between the British and French was poor, and the British expeditionary force's commander did not communicate the overall battle plan. On 20 September the division formed the right wing of the British advance with the French on their right. In the afternoon, it attacked across the river, fended off a counter-attack, and pushed the Russians from their positions, suffering 498 casualties during the day including Evans who was wounded. The advance resumed on 23 September, and the expeditionary force surrounded the Russian port in October. This began the Siege of Sevastopol. On 26 October the division fended off a Russian attack, and inflicted around 270 casualties for 100 of their own. During this action, Evans was injured when he fell from his horse, and Major-General John Pennefather, one of his brigade commanders, replaced him. On 5 November, under heavy fog, the 2nd Division was assailed by an overwhelming Russian force and played an important role during the Battle of Inkerman. Pennefather ordered his force to counter-attack, and they inflicted heavy losses on the Russians that saw close range bayonet fighting. The division continued to fight throughout the day following subsequent Russian attacks and suffered at least 744 casualties, including 194 killed. Although the battle ended in an Allied victory, it created the conditions that dragged the siege on through the winter into 1855. After the city had been subjected to several major cannonades, the division launched several failed attacks on Russian defensive positions, leading up to, and including the Battle of the Great Redan in 1855. This marked the division's final effort of the campaign. The expeditionary force remained in the Crimea until the war ended in 1856, after which the army demobilised.

=== Second Boer War ===
Following the Franco-Prussian War (1870–71) the British Army reviewed and attempted to implement a similar organisation to that used by the Prussian Army. The resultant 1875 mobilisation scheme called for twenty-four divisions spread across eight army corps. These formations did not exist, and the scheme looked for scattered units to coalesce in a time of crisis. (Note: This was the method used to form the 1st, 2nd, and 3rd Division in 1871, when regular, reserve, militia, and yeomanry units from across the UK converged on Aldershot. The military were also accompanied by volunteers.) The Second Boer War broke out on 11 October 1899, after tensions rose between the British Empire and the South African Republic and the Orange Free State. In response, and to reinforce their military presence in southern Africa, the British Government mobilised the Natal Field Force. This force, also known as the First Army Corps, corresponded with the I Corps of the 1875 mobilisation scheme, and include the 1st, 2nd, and 3rd Divisions.

On mobilisation, the 2nd Division consisted of the 3rd (Highland) and the 4th Brigade, and was commanded by Major-General Francis Clery. Before the division arrived in southern Africa, the Boers invaded the British Cape and Natal colonies, and besieged Kimberley and Ladysmith respectively. As there was no strategic plan in place for the use of the First Army Corps, it was used piecemeal as it arrived. The Highland Brigade was assigned to the Kimberley relief column, while the 4th Brigade was dispatched to Natal to relieve Ladysmith. Clery, promoted to lieutenant-general, arrived at Frere, south of the Ladysmith, on 2 December.

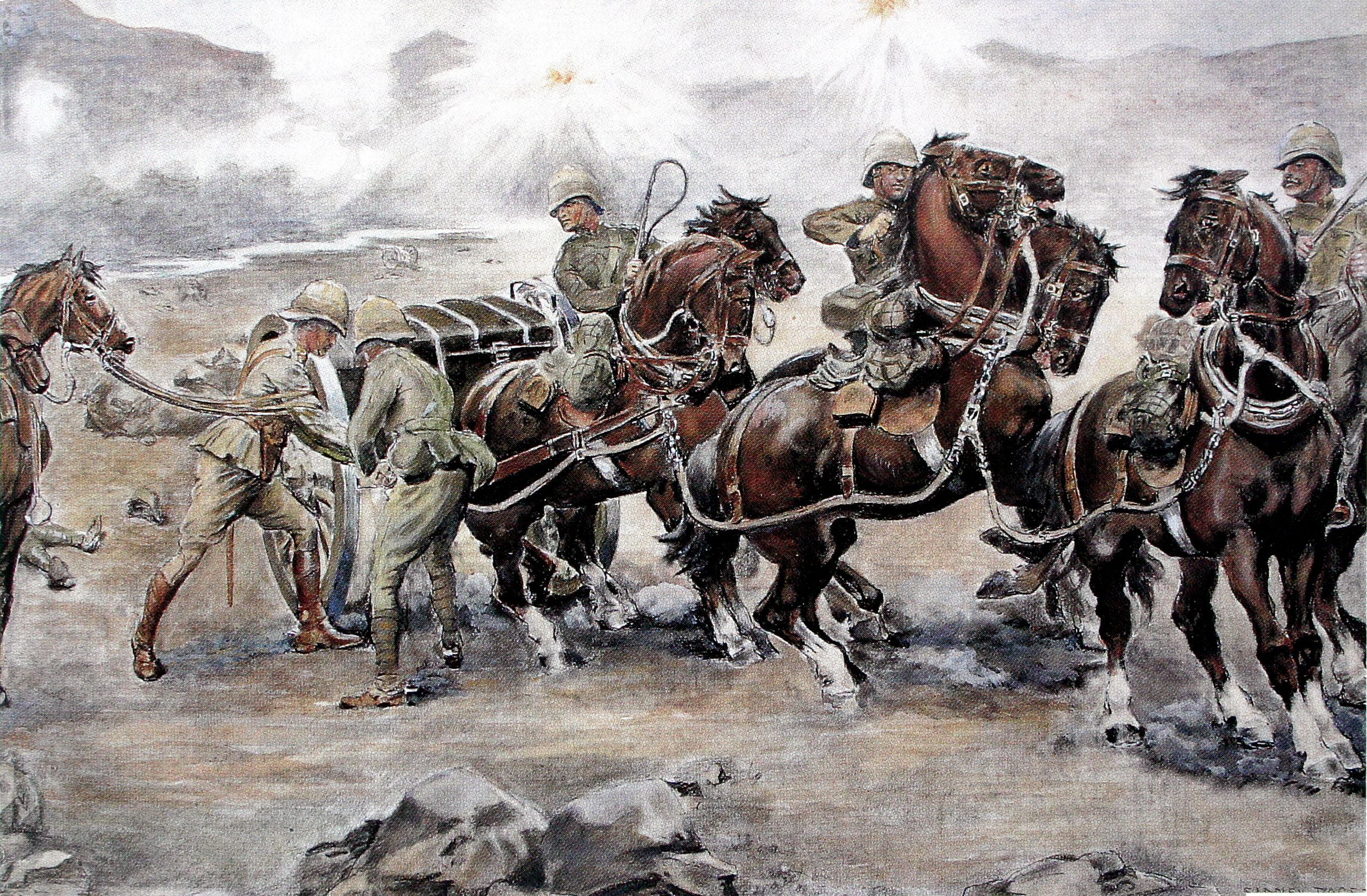
Sidney Paget's Saving the guns at Colenso depicts a key event of the battle that resulted in several Victoria Crosses being awarded.

The 2nd Division swelled to include four brigades, seven mounted infantry companies, engineers, and artillery. This force totalled 16,000 men and 44 artillery pieces. Clery intended to use this force to push across the Tugela River, punch through the entrenched Boer positions on the opposite bank and relieve Ladysmith. At the subsequent Battle of Colenso this effort was defeated. Before the fighting, an artillery battery had moved close to the river and the Boer positions. This resulted in many of the crew being rendered casualties once the Boer onslaught started. General Redvers Buller, commander of the First Army Corps, was present at the battle and had left Clery to command. Once the artillery became endangered, Buller asserted himself. He ordered the guns retrieved, and the withdrawal of the division. In the fighting, Clery's command suffered 1,127–1,138 casualties. Colenso was one of a string of defeats that the British suffered in a one-week period, which became known as Black Week. In January 1900 the force was reorganised so that the 2nd Division comprised just the 2nd and 5th Brigades. On 6 January the division bombarded Boer positions at Colenso. Two days later the 2nd and the 5th Divisions took part in the second attempt to relieve Ladysmith. On 18 January the division crossed the river near Springfield and outflanked Colenso to the west. It then fought two subsequent actions: one the next day, the other on 22 January. The advance resulted in defeat at the Battle of Spion Kop, although the division did not take part in the battle. On 5 February, at the Battle of Vaal Krantz, the 2nd Division established a bridgehead across the Tugela. Buller denied Clery's request for approval to further advance, and the Boers seized the high ground and penned the division against the river. The position was held, under artillery fire, until 7 February when the division was withdrawn after suffering 290 casualties. The division next saw action on 17 February at the Battle of the Tugela Heights, where it captured a strategically important hill with the loss of 170 men. Further actions were fought on 24 and 26–27 February. The Battle of the Tugela Heights saw the Boers defeated, and the siege of Ladysmith lifted.

The division rested in Natal until May, then spearheaded Buller's corps advance to the South African Republic capital of Pretoria. It arrived near Johannesburg, south of Pretoria, in the first week of July and linked up with the main British force that had already arrived following their advance from Kimberley. The division moved east and fought an action on 8 August and then occupied Amersfoort. Four days later the division took the surrender of a 182-strong Boer commando unit. Along with the rest of the main British force, it advanced farther east in pursuit of Boer commandos who had retreated. This marked the end of the conventional stage of warfare, as the Boers adopted guerrilla warfare tactics. During this period, the main British force had employed looting and burning farms as a tactic; Buller forbade his troops from doing similar. The division moved back to guard the lines of communication, and was then spread out between Ladysmith and Heidelberg, near Johannesburg, during September. By the end of 1900 the field divisions had been broken up to disperse the troops to garrison towns and create more mobile forces to counter the new Boer tactics.

== Reform period ==
In response to the lessons learnt from the war, which included the army's failings in the opening months, the Secretary of State for War, St John Brodrick, set out to reform the standing army. He intended to create six army corps, three of which would be composed of permanent standing formations that consisted of the army's regulars. They would be ready for immediate dispatch in light of an imperial crisis or in the event of European war. In 1902 three corps were formed that would allow up to nine divisions, each of two brigades, to be created. This included the 2nd Division formed on 1 April 1902, under the command of Major-General Charles Douglas. The division consisted of the 3rd and the 4th Brigades, and was based in Aldershot. The division was part of the 1st Army Corps, of only two divisions (the 3rd Division would be mobilised in the event of war). In 1907 the Haldane Reforms further restructured the regular army into six infantry divisions, each with three brigades. These would form the basis of any British Expeditionary Force (BEF) that would be dispatched to Europe in the case of war. This included the 2nd Division, which then consisted of the 4th (Guards), the 5th, and the 6th Brigades. The 1st and the 2nd Divisions were allocated to Aldershot Command, a military district based at Aldershot. On the outbreak of war, Aldershot Command would form the nucleus of a new I Corps, which would then be dispatched with the BEF. The 2nd Division took part in the Army Manoeuvres of 1912 and 1913.

== First World War ==
=== 1914 ===
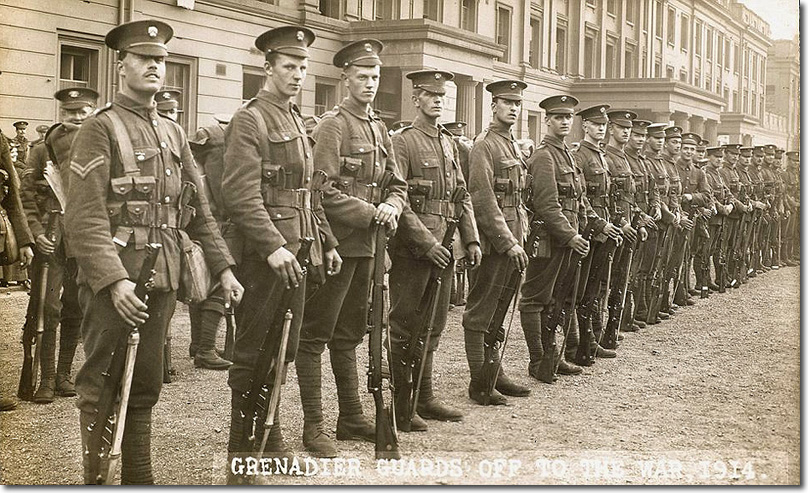
This excellent photo taken by Christina Broom at Wellington Barracks shows men of the 2nd Battalion, Grenadier Guards, parading prior to embarkation for France in August 1914.

On 28 July 1914 the First World War began and a week later Germany invaded Belgium, and the British Empire entered the war against the German Empire. The same day, reservists were called-up and ordered to join the division to bring it up to full strength. The war establishment of each of the BEF's divisions was 18,179 men. This process took until 9 August. Three days later, the majority of the division embarked ships at Southampton and began landing at Le Havre the following day. By 21 August the division had fully arrived in France and had assembled on the Belgian border along with the rest of the BEF. (Note: The BEF's order of battle at this time included the Cavalry Division; I Corps: the 1st and the 2nd Divisions; II Corps: the 3rd and the 5th Divisions.)

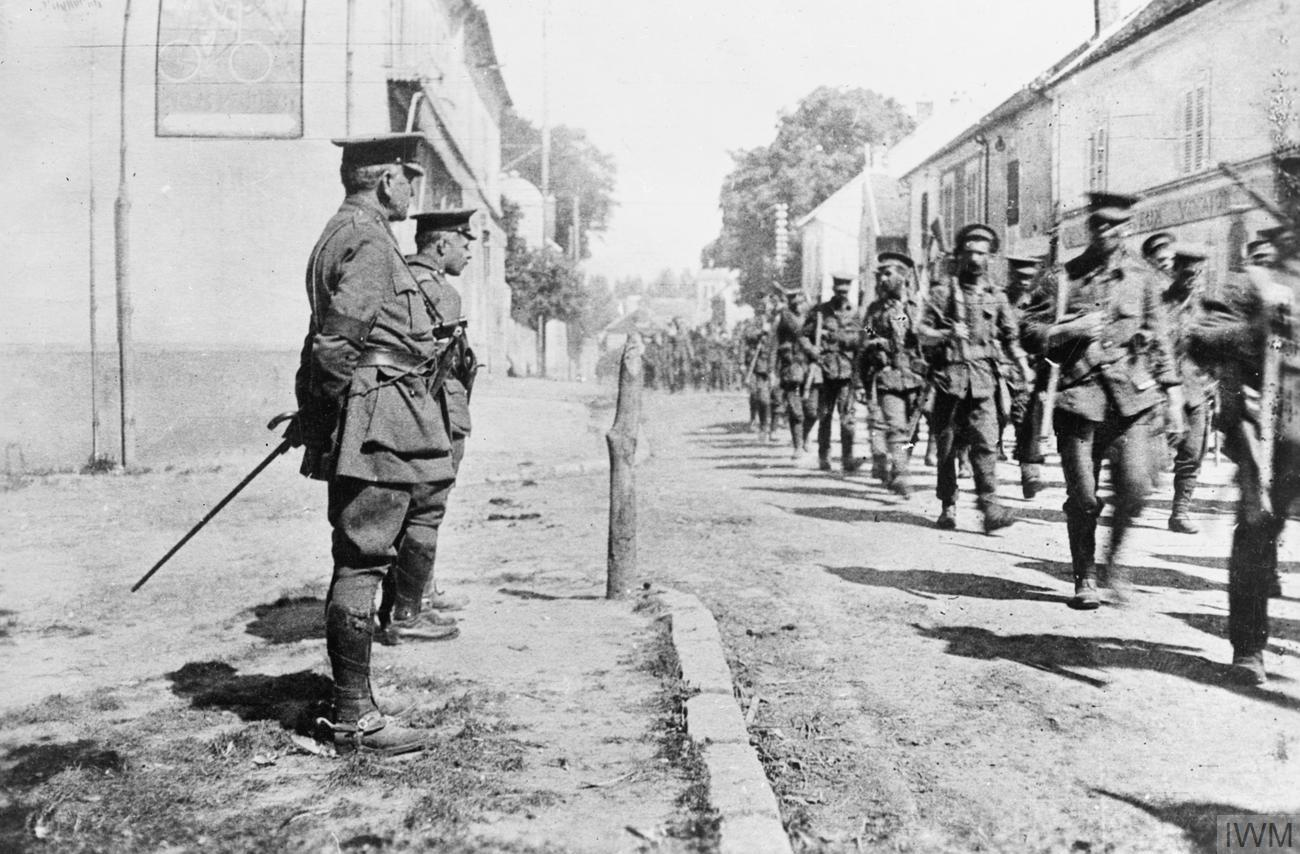
Major-General Charles Munro, commanding officer of the division during 1914, inspects his men as they march through a village.

The next day, the BEF advanced into Belgium with the French Fifth Army. The divisional reconnaissance elements made contact with German forces on 23 August on the outskirts of Mons. This resulted in the division's first casualties of the war, as well as the first of eighteen Victoria Cross that would be earned by members of the division during the war. While II Corps saw the brunt of the fighting during the Battle of Mons, the division entrenched around 5 miles (8.0 km) south of the city and contended with shellfire and false reports of German movements. At nightfall, following a strategic reverse, the division and the BEF were ordered to retreat; a move known as the Great Retreat. Forced to abandon large quantities of supplies, the division withdrew and fought several rearguard actions. These included fighting at Landrecies, France, on 25 August; the rearguard affair of Le Grand Fayt the following day; and the rearguard actions of Villers-Cotterêts on 1 September. After a 236-mile (380 km) retreat, the division arrived at Fontenay, near Paris, on 5 September. Owing to a strategic change in the Anglo-French and German dispositions, the BEF was ordered to counter-attack during the First Battle of the Marne. With the exception of skirmishing, the division saw little fighting. They advanced after the retreating Germans, who had been defeated largely by the French. The division fought several actions against German rearguards during early September. It then fought in the First Battle of the Aisne, which saw the first trench networks begun. It suffered 843 casualties and upwards of 1,000 more were recorded as missing. During the First Battle of Ypres, which now saw both sides entrenched within extensive networks, the division fought numerous actions. In five weeks of battle, the division suffered 5,769 casualties and was reduced to 11,500 men. This brought the division's total casualties in 1914 to 10,069. For the rest of the year, the division rested, refitted, undertook training, manned and repaired trenches, and engaged in mutual artillery bombardments. On 3 December the division was reviewed by George V and the Prince of Wales (the future Edward VIII). The latter returned to stay with the division later in the month, for two days, and reviewed troops in the trenches.

=== 1915 ===
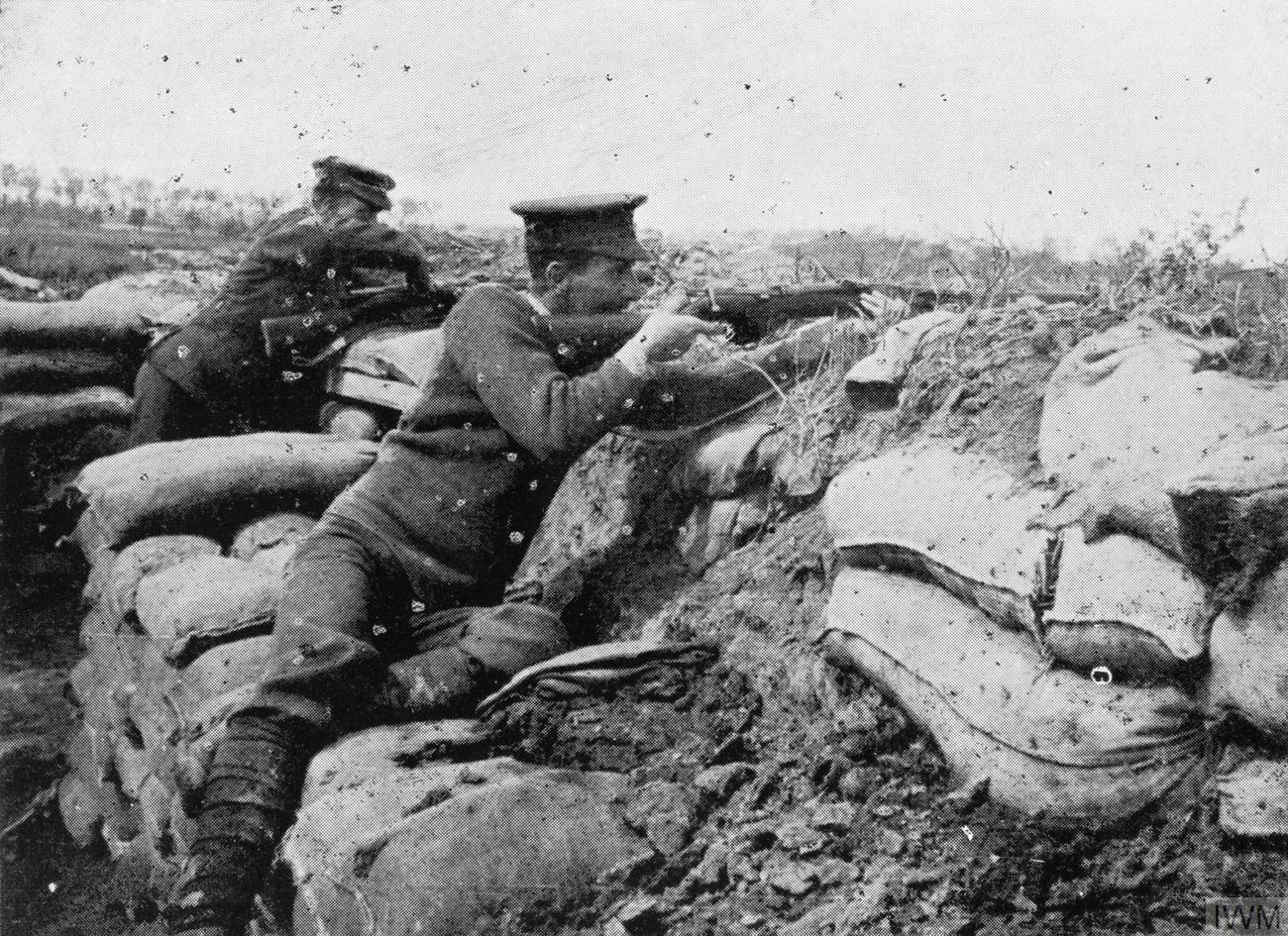
Snipers from the Oxfordshire and Buckinghamshire Light Infantry on the front line c. 1914–15

During February 1915 the division launched minor attacks and captured several German positions. Trench raids followed, until the 2nd Division took part in the Battle of Neuve Chapelle in March, and suffered over 600 casualties. Trench raids were sandwiched between the division's activities in the Battle of Festubert – part of the Second Battle of Artois – in May, and the Battle of Loos (September–October). The bloody fighting of the former saw minor advances made, heavy casualties inflicted on the Germans, and a further 5,446 divisional casualties. At Loos the division deployed chemical weapons for the first time. Due to light wind the gas clouds hung along the division's line. The first day's attack had mixed results, and ranged from an attack that stalled as soon as the men left their trenches, to sections of the German first line of trenches being captured. Afterwards, minor attacks were launched and German counter-attacks fended off. By the end of the battle the division had lost 3,400 men with the majority inflicted on the first day.

=== 1916 ===
In early 1916 the division played a minor defensive role during the German attack on Vimy Ridge. The next major action came during the summer of 1916, when the division fought in the Battle of the Somme, in particular the Battles of Delville Wood, Guillemont and Ancre. The division entered the offensive on 26 July to retake Deville Wood, which had been captured and then lost to a German counter-attack. In a two-day battle the division cleared the wood. It fended off several German counter-attacks over the following days. On 30 July the division launched an attack to capture Guillemont and the nearby Falfemont Farm. these actions met with mixed results. After five days of fighting, by 31 July, the division had suffered over 3,000 casualties and reported that only one battalion was ready for further offensive operations. The division remained on the line, subject to heavy shelling and trench raids, before it renewed efforts to take Guillemont on 8 August. This effort, alongside the 55th (West Lancashire) Division, lasted through 9 August and failed. The division was relieved and moved to a different sector of the front. It engaged in mutual bombardments and trench raids. On 13 November the Battle of Ancre began and was the final stage of the Somme fighting. The division assisted in the Capture of Beaumont-Hamel, and suffered almost 3,000 casualties. With the conclusion of the Somme offensive, the division was withdrawn from the line for rest and to train.

=== 1917 ===
During the opening months of 1917 the division conducted trench raids and minor attacks in the Ancre Valley.

On 16 March the Germans undertook a planned retreat to the Hindenburg Line, and the division advanced after them.

In April the division took part in the Battle of Arras, the British part of the Nivelle offensive. In particular, the division fought between 27 and 29 April, in the Battle of Arleux, and between 3 and 4 May in the Battle of the Scarpe.

After a period of rest and training the division returned to the frontline and re-engaged in trench warfare. In October the additions to the division were put through intensive musketry training to bring them up the standard of the remaining pre-war Regulars.

The division started to enter the trenches on the front, during the Battle of Cambrai on 27 November. On the tenth day of the battle, 30 November, the division fought in a defensive action against a determined German counter-attack. Results of the fighting were mixed: some units held their positions, and others were forced back up to 300 yards (270 m). During the fighting, one battery of eight machine-guns fired 70,000 rounds and another two batteries fired 100,000 between them. The division suffered around 2,000 casualties during the day, and included the entire D Company of the 13th (Service) Battalion, Essex Regiment, being killed or taken prisoner.

For the remainder of the year, the division manned the front and engaged in trench warfare. Total casualties for 1917 amounted to 8,770.

=== 1918 ===
By 1918 the number of front-line infantry within the BEF had decreased because of casualties and a lack of eligible reinforcements, leading to a manpower crisis. To consolidate manpower and to increase the ratio of machine guns and artillery support available to the infantry, the number of battalions in a division was reduced from twelve to nine; with each brigade being reduced from four to three battalions. This reduced the establishment of a division from 18,825 men to 16,035.

For the 2nd Division, this change took place in February when three battalions were disbanded. The troops from one were redistributed to other units within the division, while the others left. Major-General Cecil Pereira, the division's commander during this period, said "The old soldiers who have survived many a fight are very hard hit by this." (Note: These battalions were the 13th (Service) Battalion (West Ham), Essex Regiment, and the 17th (Service) Battalion, Middlesex Regiment, both of the 6th Brigade; and the 22nd (Service) Battalion (Kensington), Royal Fusiliers, of the 99th Brigade.)

During the opening months of the year, the division again manned the frontline. Its last week in the line, which ended on 20 March, saw the division suffer 3,000 casualties from the German use of gas.

On 21 March Germany launched Operation Michael. This attack, which became the opening salvo of their spring offensive, aimed to deliver a single, decisive, war-winning blow. The Germans intended to strike the southern British flank, to separate the British and French armies and then move north to engage the bulk of the British forces in France in a battle of annihilation. The aim was to inflict such a defeat upon the British that the country would abandon the war, which in turn would force the French to sue for peace.

As a result, the greatly weakened division re-entered the line on 21 March and engaged in heavy fighting through April. When the division was relieved on 4 April it had suffered 4,000 casualties and been reduced to a fighting strength of around 6,000. Wyrall wrote, "fighting divisions with such fine records as that held by the 2nd Division were not allowed long out of the line". Consequently, the division returned to the frontline by 15 April, and was soon engaged in more back and forth fighting. By 6 June the German offensive had ended. The division rebuilt its strength, trained, and tutored newly arrived American troops.

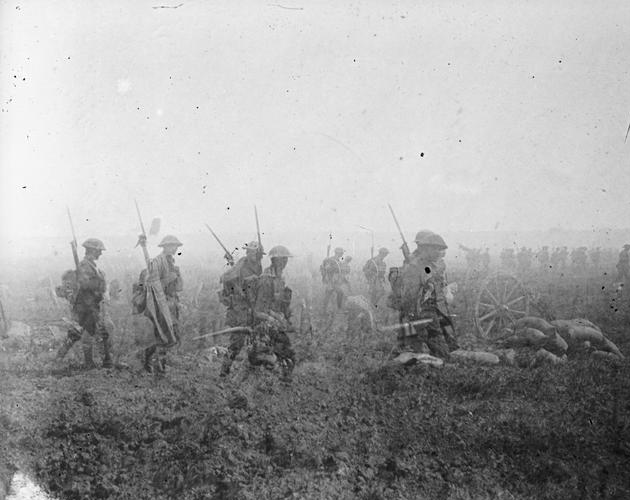
Men from the division's 1st Battalion, Royal Berkshire Regiment, going into action on 21 August 1918

On 8 August the Allied armies launched the Battle of Amiens that began the Hundred Days Offensive, the culminating offensive of the war.

On 21 August the division took part in the Third Battle of Albert, part of the Second Battle of the Somme, and liberated several villages. This was followed by fighting at Arras, between 2–3 September, and then an advance to the Canal du Nord.

Over the course of the rest of the month, the division took part in preliminary operations for the Battle of Havrincourt and then the Battle of the Canal du Nord. In October the division fought at Second Battle of Cambrai and liberated the village of Forenville. By this point of the offensive, divisional casualties had reached 3,900.

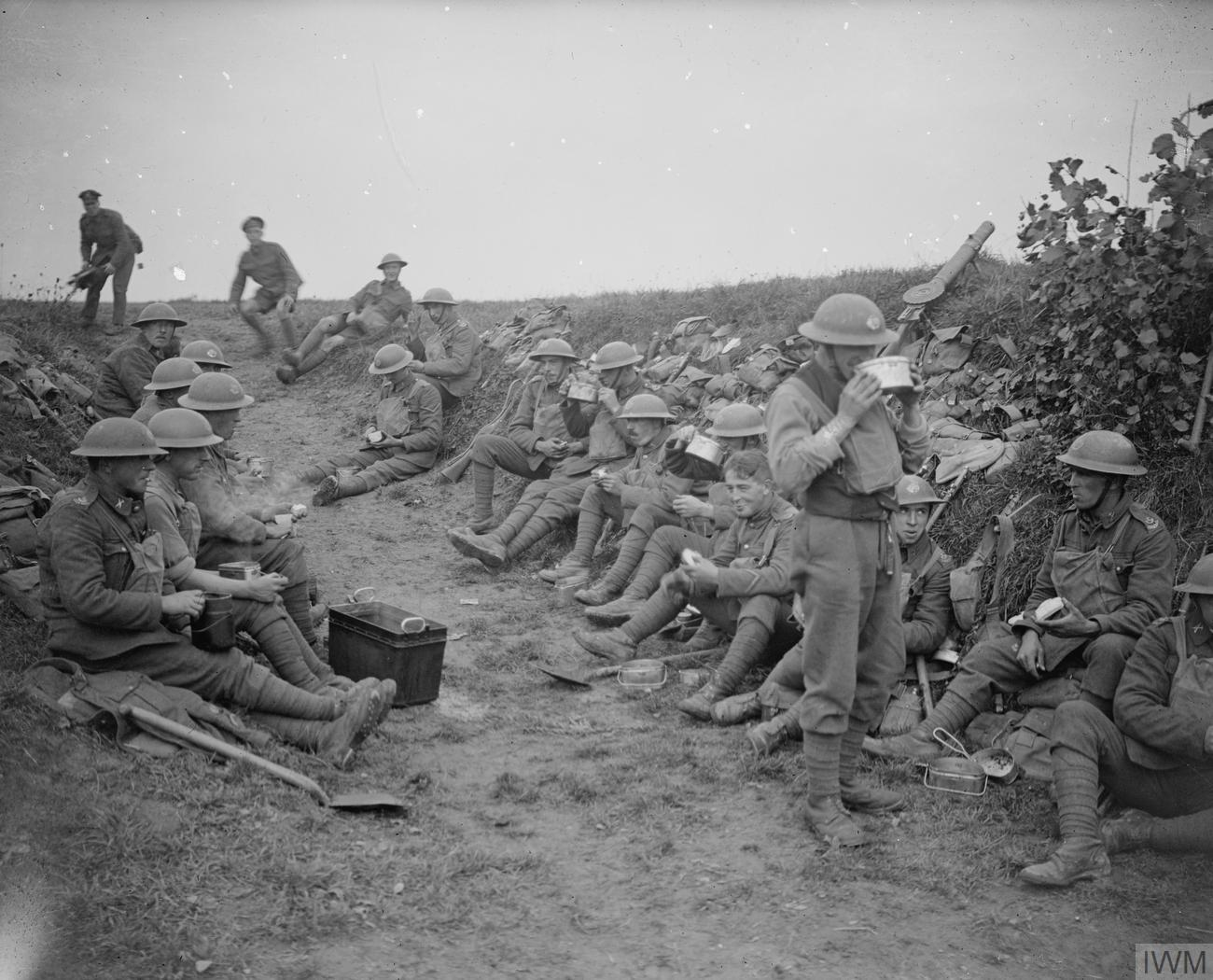
Men of No. 1 Platoon, A Company, 10th (Service) Battalion, Duke of Cornwall's Light Infantry, the divisional pioneers, breakfasting on their way to the line, near Le Quesnoy, France, 27 October 1918.

The Battle of the Selle followed, between 17 and 25 October, and the division reached the outskirts of Forêt de Mormal. Wyrall noted that some of the division's old hands had last marched through this forest in 1914. The division carried out its last trench raid of the war on 1 November, before it moved into reserve and ended the war near Le Quesnoy, France. Casualties in the final year of the war amounted to 10,201.

Don Farr, a historian, wrote the division had "an excellent reputation" and continued "to be rated as one of the BEF's best" throughout the war.

== Inter-war period ==
After the conclusion of fighting, the division advanced into Germany to join the occupation force, the British Army of the Rhine. It entered Germany on 9 December and arrived between Düren and Cologne on 27 December. On 17 February 1919 the division was demobilised. The six regular army battalions within the division, along with the artillery and one engineer unit, were ordered home. The division, with the troops remaining in Germany, was re-designated as the Light Division and the 2nd Division ceased to exist. On 28 June 1919 the 2nd Division was re-formed in Aldershot, and included the same brigades as before the First World War.

== Second World War ==
=== Battle of France and home defence ===
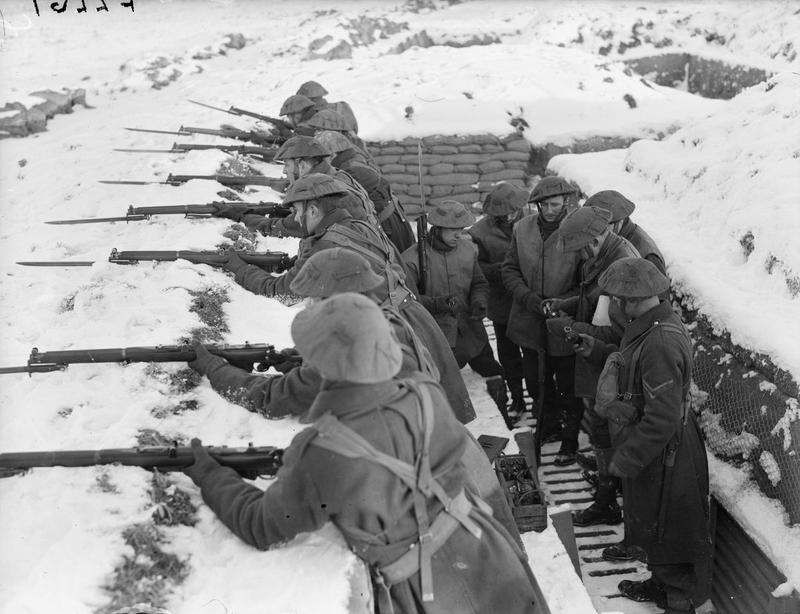
Men of the 2nd Battalion, Royal Norfolk Regiment, man a snow-covered forward trench in France while hand grenades are handed out to other soldiers on 26 January 1940.

On 3 September 1939 the UK declared war on Nazi Germany, in response to the latter's invasion of Poland. The division landed at Cherbourg on 21 September 1939 and arrived on the Franco–Belgian border on 3 October. Along with the three other divisions of the BEF, it was based east of Lille. During the rest of the year and into 1940, the division trained and assisted in the construction of field fortifications. David Fraser, a historian and former British general, wrote that the regular formations of the BEF were well-trained in small arms, but lacked tactical skill. Though mobile, the formations lacked specialist weapons, ammunition, spare parts, and communication equipment because of the budget cuts of the inter-war period.

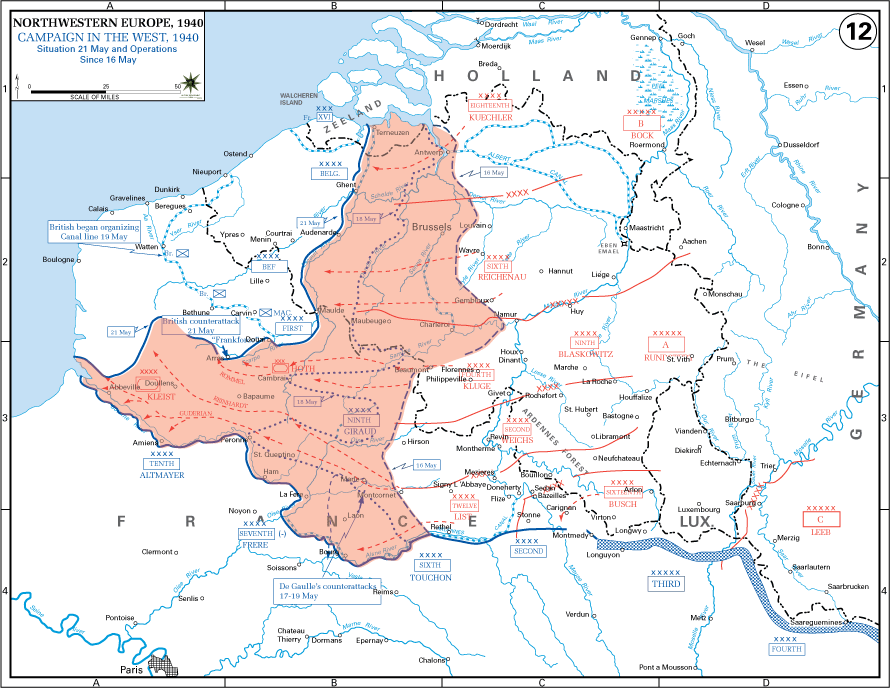

On 10 May 1940 Germany invaded Belgium. In response Anglo–French armies moved into Belgium in accordance with the Allied Dyle Plan. The division reached the River Dyle without difficulties. Although the division achieved tactical success in its first action on 15 May, strategic developments forced the BEF withdraw the next day. The division retreated 40 miles (64 km) within 27 hours. As the strategic situation grew worse, several divisions were ordered to form a cordon around the BEF's line of retreat. The La Bassée Canal and the river Aa, in France, were the only defensible positions that covered the BEF's southern and western flank. The 2nd Division defended part of the canal and engaged in several actions on 25–26 May. On 26 May, with the majority of the BEF bound within a closing perimeter on the French coast and lacking the ability to hold the position, the decision was made to evacuate from Dunkirk, the only remaining port in British hands. The 2nd Division was ordered to maintain its position at the canal, to allow other formations to retreat. Hugh Sebag-Montefiore, a historian, wrote this was "the most difficult assignment handed to any unit in the BEF" and that the difficulty of this task "can be gauged by the small number of soldiers who returned home". On 28 May, the 2nd Division was assailed by the 3rd and 7th Panzer Divisions, the SS Division Totenkopf, and also came under air attack. The heavy fighting saw the 2nd Division reduced from 13,000 men to around 2,500, those who were not killed were taken prisoner by the Germans. By the time the 5th Brigade's 1st Battalion, Queen's Own Cameron Highlanders was evacuated, it had been reduced to 79 men. To this point in the campaign, this was the highest number of casualties suffered by a single battalion within the BEF. After the fighting had ended, 97 members of the 2nd Division were murdered in the Le Paradis massacre. Lionel Ellis, who wrote the volume focused on the BEF in France for the History of the Second World War, stated the division "had indeed sacrificed itself to keep open the line of retirement", delayed the Germans, and ensured French formations were not trapped. During the night of 28–29 May, the division withdrew into the Dunkirk perimeter, from where it evacuated.

On returning to England the division was dispatched to Yorkshire. Through April 1942, the division was assigned to the defence of the county. It was also rebuilt, trained, and assisted in coastal defence duties. On 15 April the 16,000-strong division left the UK. It had been intended that the division to reinforce the British Eighth Army in the North African Western Desert. In May the convoy was ordered to sail for British India because of increasing civil tension there.

=== India and Burma ===
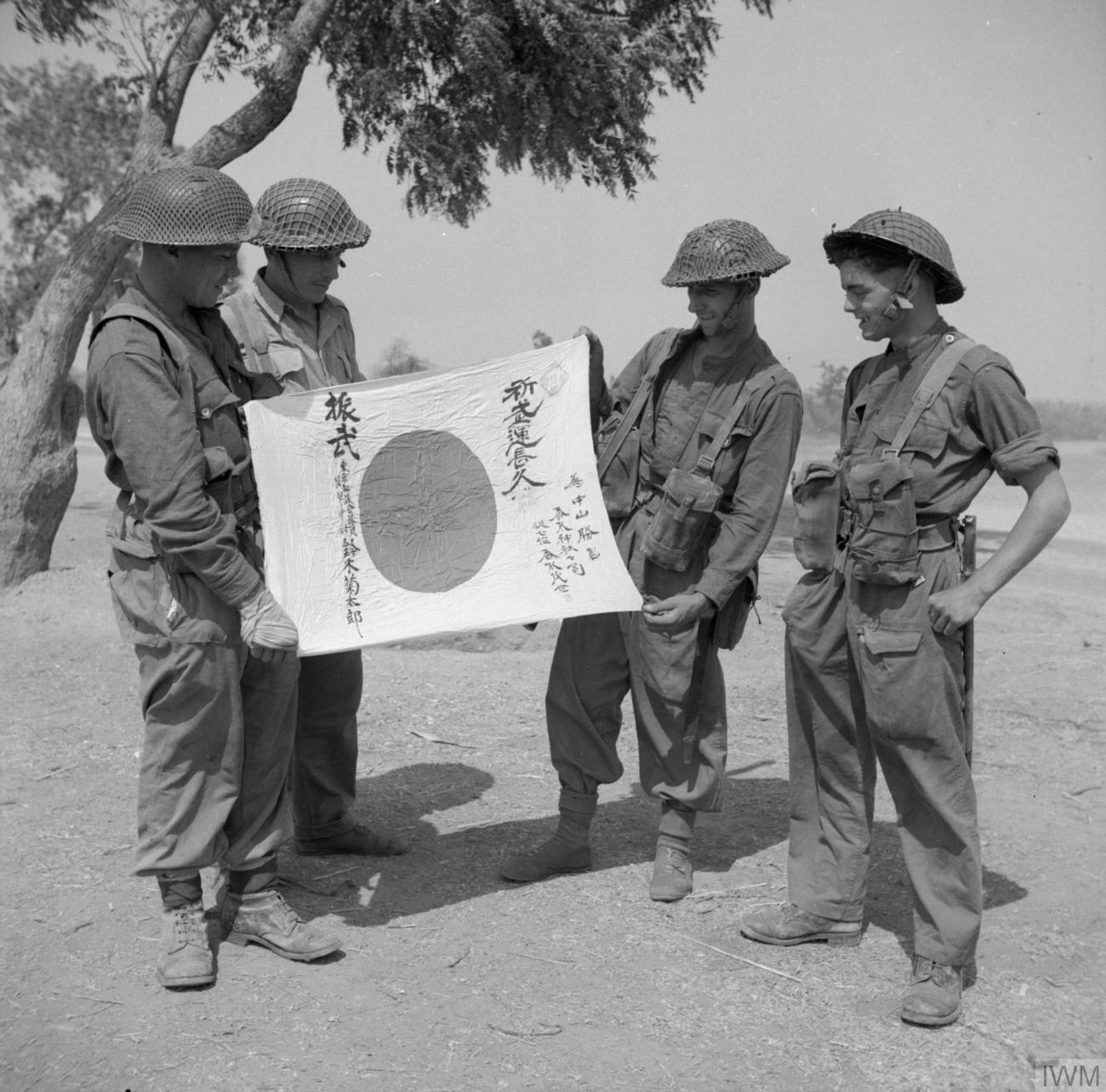
Men from the division's 7th Battalion, Worcestershire Regiment, display a Japanese Good Luck Flag captured on Mount Popa during the mop-up operations that took place after the capture of Mandalay.

The division arrived in July 1942, and was based initially at Poona before it established itself at Ahmednagar. In Asia, following the Empire of Japan's entry into the war in December 1941 and the conclusion of the Malayan campaign and the Battle of Singapore, the Burma campaign was the primary theatre of operations where British forces were engaged against those of Japan. Because of the logistical issues at the time, the division could not be employed in Burma. Instead, the division formed part of the British strategic reserve in Asia. In July, as a result of the German advance into the Caucasus region of the Soviet Union, the 2nd and the 5th Divisions were selected to be deployed to the Kingdom of Iraq if German forces entered the Middle East. Concurrently, an Axis advance into Egypt was stopped at the First Battle of El Alamein, in July 1942. In August the two divisions were again offered as reinforcements to move into the Middle East. No move was undertaken, as a result of the defeat of the Axis forces at the Second Battle of El Alamein (October and November 1942). This battle followed the defeat of German forces during the Battle of Stalingrad (August 1942 – February 1943), removed the threat to the Middle East. In November 1942 the division's 6th Infantry Brigade was detached and assigned to several British Indian Army formations, and fought in the Arakan Campaign in Burma. It returned to the division in June 1943.

The 2nd Division spent 1942 to 1944 training at its Ahmednagar base. It dispatched one brigade at a time to conduct jungle warfare training near Belgaum, and also sent troops to Bombay to undertake combined operations training. Amphibious warfare training took place as well, as the division has been assigned to take part in Operation Anakim. This operation, scheduled for November 1943, was a proposed landing that would take place at Rangoon as part of a larger effort to retake Burma. Developments around the other theatres of the war caused a shortage of shipping to India, which resulted in the continued postponement to this operation. During 1943, the division made preliminary preparations for a move to Tehran, Iran, but ultimately did not go. Shifting Allied plans for the reconquest of Burma saw the division, by late 1943, assigned to Operation Bullfrog. Rather than an assault on Rangoon, this proposed amphibious landing would take place near Akyab, on the Arakan coastline of Burma. Like Anakim, this would be in conjunction with a new offensive into Burma. By January 1944 this and all amphibious operations had been cancelled along with the proposed deployment of the division.

The following month, the British frontline started to prepare for an expected Japanese offensive. In March Japan invaded India, and then besieged Imphal and Kohima. In response the 2nd Division was assigned to the British Fourteenth Army and ordered to move to Chittagong. As a result of the fighting at Kohima, the division was diverted to the province of Assam. After a move of 2,000 miles (3,200 km), the division launched a counter-attack on 12 April. In conjunction with the 7th Indian Infantry Division, the division broke the Japanese siege of Kohima and forced them to retreat. Advancing towards Imphal, the division fought several actions with Japanese forces. On 20 June the division linked up with British Indian forces who had advanced from Imphal, which ended that siege. In the course of this fighting, the division assisted in the destruction of the Japanese 31st Division, and suffered 2,125 casualties.

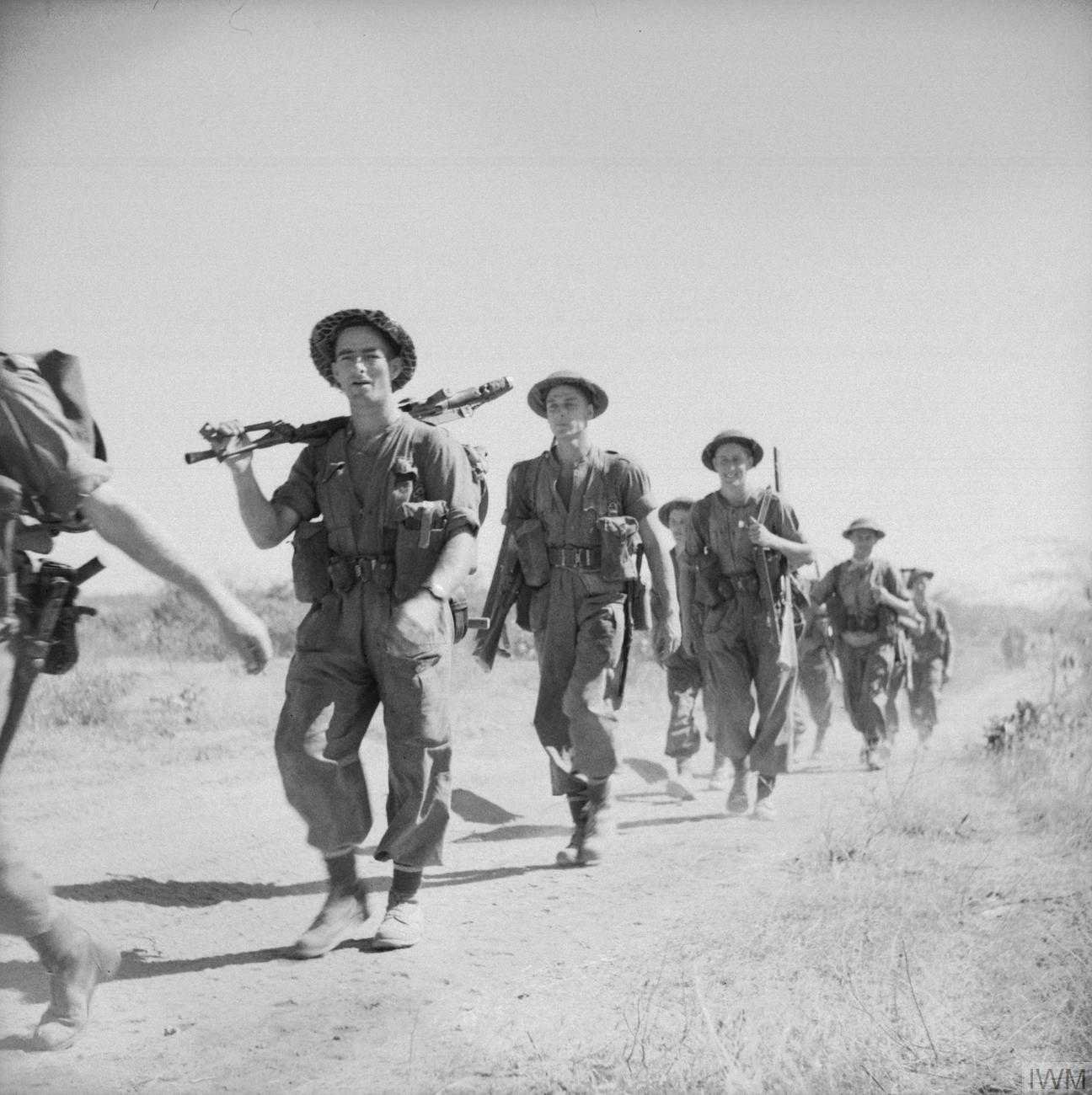
Tommies of the 1st Battalion, Dorset Regiment, moving into Ywathitgyi to relieve the 1st Battalion, Royal Scots, who captured the town, February 1945.

British infantry reinforcements within India were scarce. To maintain the division in the field and make up losses, several British anti-aircraft units in the theatre were disbanded. This released around 3,500 British soldiers, of whom 2,500 were dispatched to the 2nd Division. In November the division started to move towards Burma, and by 7 December was concentrated across the border at Yazagyo. As part of Operation Capital, the 2nd Division then advanced 150 miles (240 km) and captured several important airfields that were required for the supply effort for the advance to Mandalay. At the end of 1944 the division was near Shwebo, north of Mandalay. Heavy rain delayed progress, and the city was not captured until 11 January 1945. In the opening three months of 1945, the division took part in the Battle of Meiktila and Mandalay. This culminated with the capture of the latter on 21 March, in part by the division. While the main advance proceeded to Rangoon, the division cleared bypassed Japanese positions near Mandalay. As the reconquest of Burma entered its final stage, those forces that were not going to be used were withdrawn to India. The 2nd and the 36th infantry divisions were selected to be relieved because of the increasing shortage of British manpower in Asia, which impeded the ability to maintain them at full strength. This was, in part, the result of the "python" scheme that aimed to repatriate soldiers who had served in Asia for at least three years and eight months back to the UK. The 2nd Division left their transport in Burma, and the troops were flown to India between 10 and 20 April.

In India, the division was transported to Calcutta, where it was re-equipped and assigned to Operation Dracula – an amphibious assault on Rangoon. In the event, the city was liberated by other forces and the 2nd Division did not depart for the port. With Burma retaken, the British set their sights on the recapture of Malaya. An amphibious landing, codenamed Operation Zipper, aimed to land forces along the Malayan coastline and then liberate Singapore. The 2nd Division was not chosen to take part in this operation, as 10,000 of its troops were due to repatriated during 1945, but did provide communication and administrative assistance. The surrender of Japan forestalled this endeavour, and the division ended the war back at Poona.

== The post-war and Cold War period ==
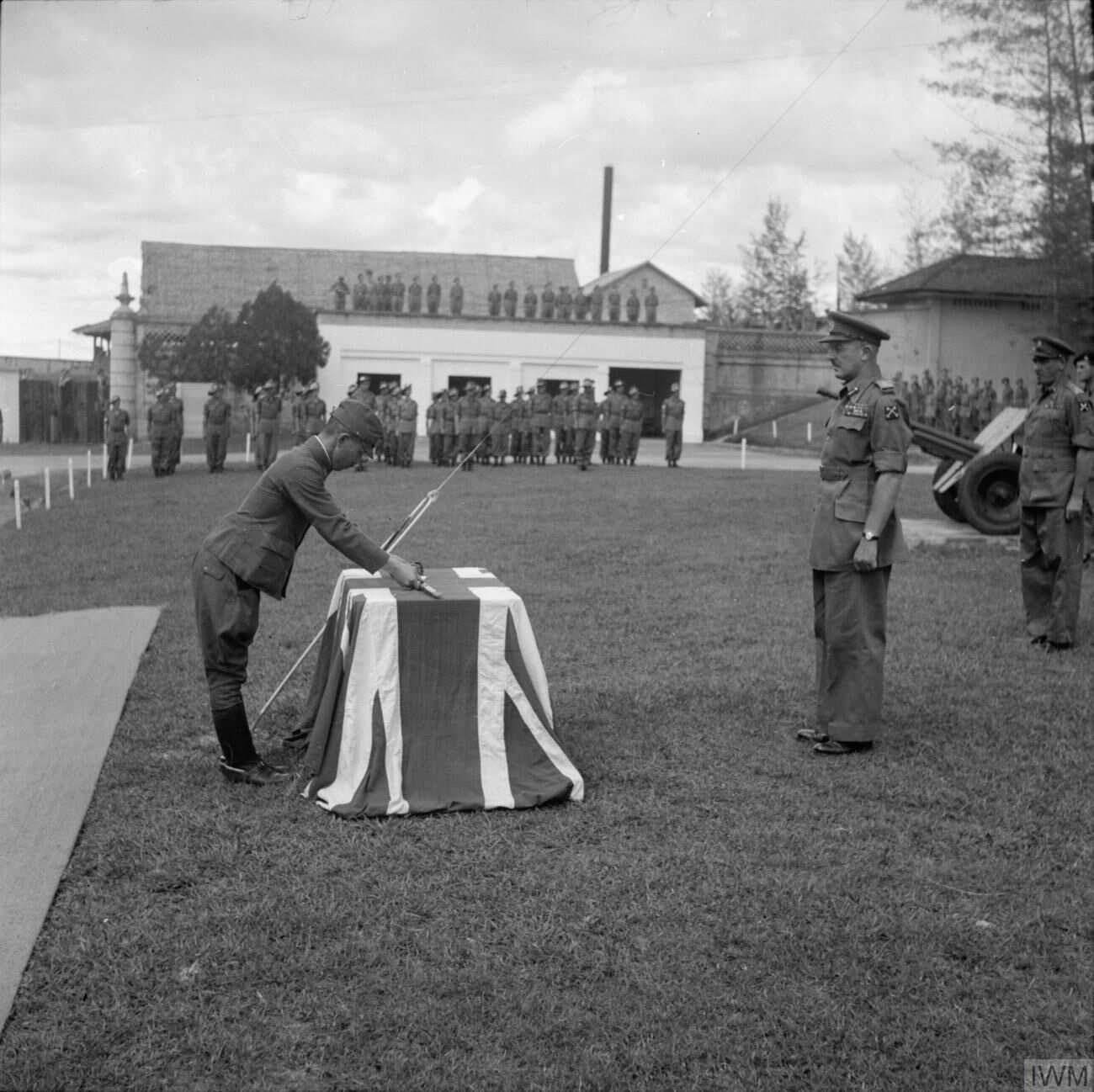
Major-General Cameron Nicholson, 2nd Division GOC, at a surrender ceremony in Johore, Malaya, in 1946. Thirty-seven Japanese officers from the Seventh Area Army, the Malayan occupation force, surrendered their swords during the ceremony.

At Poona the division was joined by the 36th Infantry Division. In August 1945 the 2nd Division absorbed the 36th Division, and the latter then ceased to exist. The 5th Infantry Brigade left the division and was dispatched to Japan as part of the British Commonwealth Occupation Force. In November, the 2nd Division arrived in Malaya. It occupied Singapore and key locations throughout Malaya in an effort to maintain law and order, which had broken down following the Japanese surrender. The division remained in Malaya until 1946, when it was disbanded.

At the end of the Second World War the UK was allocated an occupation zone in northwest Germany and formed a new British Army of the Rhine (BAOR) to administer its occupation forces. The 53rd (Welsh) Infantry Division was part of this army until February 1947. At that point it was renumbered as the 2nd Infantry Division. Some troops from Malaya, who had been part of the earlier 2nd Division, were shipped to Germany to bring the new division up to strength. (Note: Following the creation of West Germany in 1949, BAOR ceased being an occupation force and became part of the British contribution to the defence of Western Europe against potential attack from the Soviet Union. At the time this was through the Western Union Defence Organisation. Britain reaffirmed this role at the 1954 London and Paris Conferences, and promised to commit four divisions to the defence of Europe. The 2nd Division remained in Germany throughout this period.) The division remained part of the BAOR until the 1980s. The division was headquartered at Düsseldorf, and later at Bunde. In 1958 the "infantry" designation was dropped from the division's title. In the early 1960s the division, with its headquarters at Lubbecke, comprised the 6th and 12th Infantry Brigade Groups.

By the 1970s the UK had to reconcile its decreased resources with its commitments, as well as the increased threat from the Soviet Union. The 1975 Mason Review, a Government white paper that outlined a new defence policy, called for BAOR to be restructured. This included the elimination of the brigade level of command. This political change coincided with a BAOR doctrinal change that had started in the 1960s, and was pioneered by the 1st Division in the early 1970s. The restructure increased BAOR to four divisions, for the first time since the end of the 1950s, each composed of two armoured regiments, three mechanised infantry battalions, and two artillery regiments. On 1 September 1976, as part of this restructure, the 2nd Division was re-designated as the 2nd Armoured Division.

== 2nd Armoured Division, 1976–1982 ==
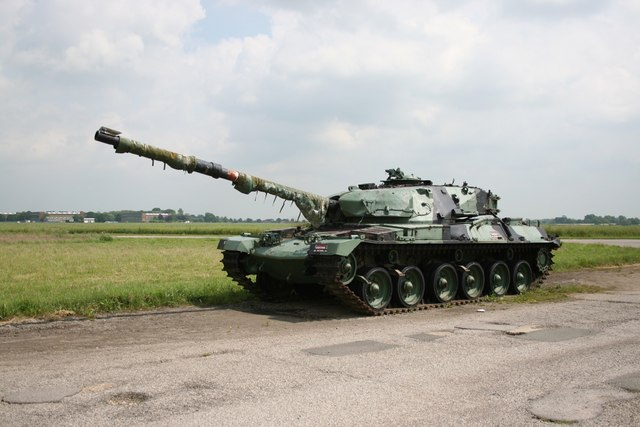
The Chieftain tank, the main battle tank of the division

The 2nd Armoured Division was the first of the four BAOR divisions to be reorganised. After the process was completed, it was 8,600 men strong, and equipped with 132 Chieftain tanks (with 12 other tanks in reserve). In a time of war, the division was expected to be reinforced by reserve and Territorial Army (TA) personnel who would arrive from the UK. These troops would be assigned to the division's existing units. For example, an infantry battalion was around 650 strong during peace. During a crisis, the reinforcements would increase the battalion to around 800 strong. With this method, the division would increase to 14,000. The divisional headquarters was based in Lübbecke, West Germany, and its signal regiment was in Bünde. As well as tanks, the division had three mechanised infantry battalions with the troops carried in FV432 armoured personnel carriers; an armoured reconnaissance regiment equipped with FV101 Scorpions and FV107 Scimitars; two regiments of self-propelled artillery; an anti-tank battery equipped with Swingfire anti-tank missiles; anti-aircraft units equipped with Blowpipe missiles; an aviation regiment equipped with scout helicopters; and support services: divisional engineers, medical, provost; transport, ordnance, and field workshop units. The actual units that comprised the division were not fixed. During the Cold War, the British Army rotated units through BAOR. For example, infantry battalions would generally serve a four-year tour with BAOR, before they were rotated to another theatre; armoured units could serve up to eight years. A number of the division's units were also rotated through Northern Ireland. Units sent there were a constant drain on the whole of BAOR. For example, the 2nd Armoured Division Engineer Regiment was deployed to Northern Ireland in December 1979.

BAOR was tasked with conducting "a mobile and intense armoured battle" against invading Soviet forces. To conduct this battle, doctrine required the division to fight a mobile defensive battle by defending key attack routes that Soviet armoured forces would more than likely use. The Soviet forces would then be lured into a killing zone where they would suffer disproportionate losses at the hands of British anti-tank guided missile-equipped infantry and tanks in hull-down defensive positions. The division would keep moving, fighting this aggressive delaying battle from the East German border. The doctrine envisioned that this attritional battle would allow the BAOR to resist a Soviet advance and buy enough time for one of several contingencies to be implemented. This would be either a diplomatic solution the arrival of reinforcements to allow further conventional warfare to be maintained, or a threat to use tactical nuclear weapons.

With the removal of the brigade level, it was intended that the division could form up to five battlegroups with each based around the headquarters of either an armoured regiment or infantry battalion. These groups were to be formed for a specific task and allocated the required forces needed. The reforms intended that the divisional commander would oversee these battlegroups, but early training showed this to be impractical. To compensate, the divisional headquarters was increased to 750 men (wartime strength) including two brigadiers, who would each command a flexible task force that would be formed by the general officer commanding (GOC). The 2nd Armoured Division's task forces were Task Force Charlie and Task Force Delta. The task force approach allowed the GOC to tailor his forces to meet unforeseen events and execute the killing area doctrine. These task forces were not a reintroduction of a brigade command structure, and they had no administrative responsibilities. In structuring the division in this manner, it allowed a reduction of 700 men. David John Anthony Stone, a historian, commented the system was "designed to allow the commander maximum flexibility and [to] take precise account of the operational or tactical task to be achieved".

In November 1976 the BAOR held Exercise Spearpoint 76. It was designed to test the 2nd Armoured Division and included troops from Denmark and the United States. The exercise demonstrated the improvement of the new organisation, but highlighted that the divisional headquarters would become inefficient as combat fatigue took over if there was prolonged combat. Following the exercise, further refinements to the organisation took place into 1977, and more armour and infantry units were transferred, bringing the formation up to strength. The Task Force concept lasted until the end of the decade, when it was replaced with brigade commands as it had not met expectations. The division then comprised the 4th and the 12th Armoured Brigades.

In 1981 John Nott, the Secretary of State for Defence for the government elected in 1979, wrote the 1981 Defence White Paper. It, like the Mason Review, aimed to balance the British military in line with the nation's financial resources. Nott's paper called for the BAOR to be restructured from four armoured divisions of two brigades, into a force of three divisions of three brigades. The intent was to save manpower and money, while only losing one divisional headquarters. Nott called for a new division to be formed in the UK, which would be made up primarily of TA personnel. The new formation would reinforce BAOR on the outbreak of war. In July 1981, the 2nd Armoured Division was chosen as the formation to be disbanded. In December 1982 the division ceased to exist, and its personnel, equipment, and units were dispersed among other BAOR formations.

== End of the Cold War and into the 21st century ==
On 1 January 1983 the 2nd Infantry Division was re-formed, based at Imphal Barracks, in York, England. The re-formed division was assigned the territorial 15th Brigade at Alanbrooke Barracks, Topcliffe, North Yorkshire; the territorial 49th Brigade, based in Nottingham; the regular army 24th Brigade, at Catterick Garrison; and the 29th Engineer Brigade, based in Newcastle upon Tyne.

Following the end of the Cold War, the division was disbanded in early 1992 as part of the British Government's Options for Change plan. In 1994 the 2nd Division was re-established in York as a training formation and replaced the existing Eastern District. In 1998 the division was 28,500 strong. As part of the 1998 Strategic Defence Review, the British Army restructured its forces within the UK to cut costs. In line with this, in April 2000, the 2nd Division absorbed Scotland District. The division headquarters was then moved to Craigiehall, near Edinburgh. The division then comprised the 15th (North East) Brigade based in York; the 42nd (North West) Brigade based in Preston; the 51st (Scottish) Brigade based in Stirling; and the 52nd Infantry Brigade based in Edinburgh. Elements of the division were also based in Chester. The division was around 2,100 men strong in 2002 and was responsible for the administration and training of soldiers in the north of England and in Scotland. If war broke out, it was to expand to 16,000–18,000 men, in line with the army's combat formations of that time. In April 2012, as part of a further restructure, the division was disbanded.

== Insignia ==
In 1916, during the First World War, the British Army divisions adopted formation signs. The design the 2nd Division chose, represented "The Second Division of the First Corps", which was indicated by two white stars (the division) either side of a single larger red star that represented I Corps. In 1940, during the Second World War, a new insignia was adopted. Major-General Charles Loyd, who had taken command of the division in 1939, designed it. He had previously commanded the 1st (Guards) Brigade before his appointment to the division, and they had used a single key as a brigade insignia. Loyd updated that design for his new command, by adding a second key. The design was used throughout the Second World War, through the Cold War, and until the division was disbanded in 2012. It has also been highlighted that the insignia resembles the coat of arms of the Archbishop of York, and could reference troop recruitment in that area.

== Memorials ==
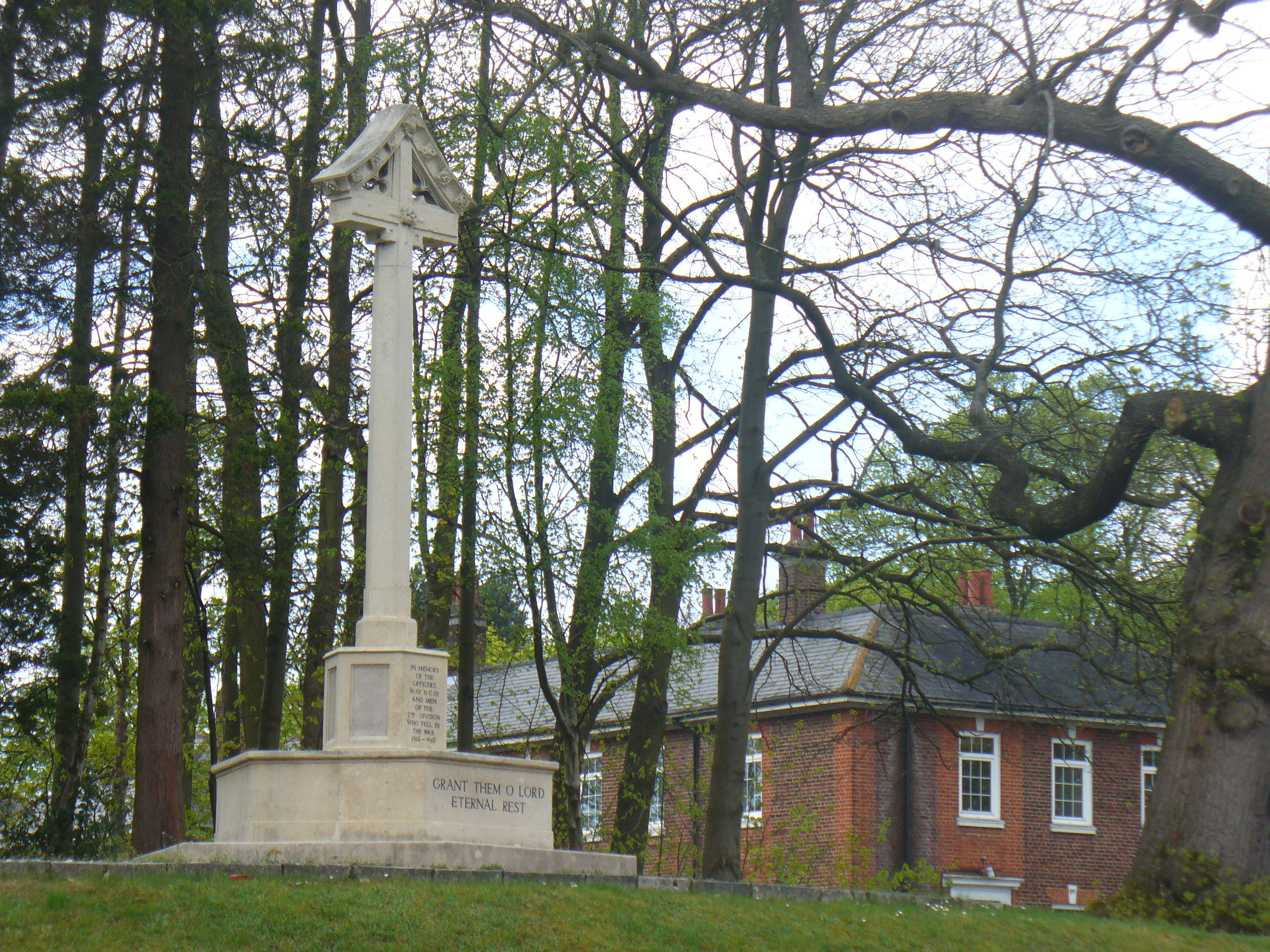
2nd Division's memorial cross at Aldershot

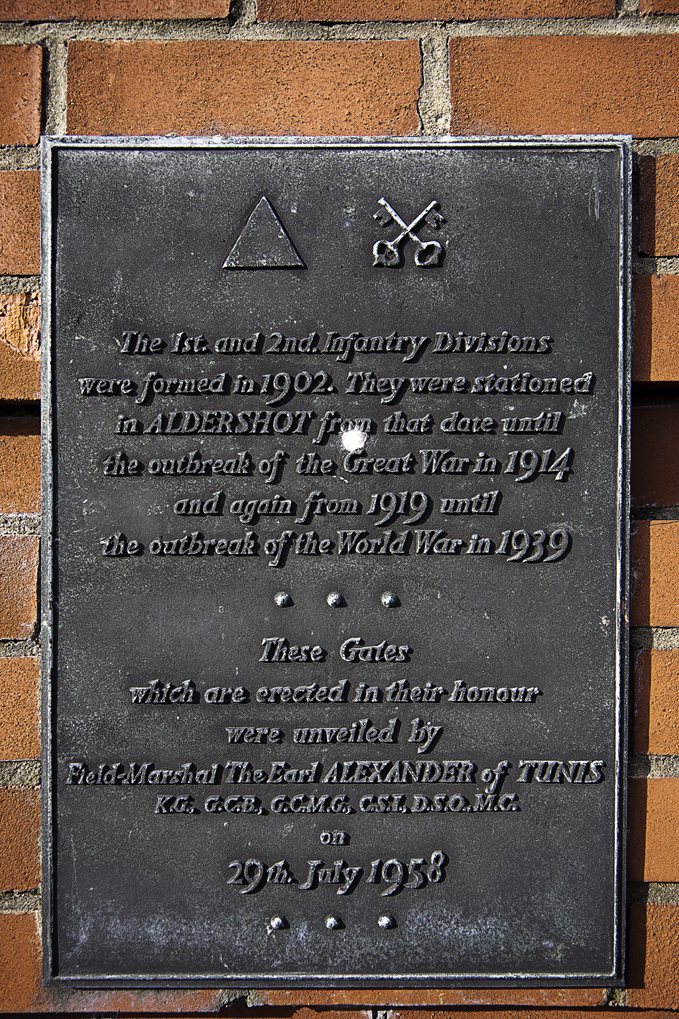
The inscription on the memorial gate at Aldershot

There are three monuments to 2nd Division in Aldershot, the division's peacetime base for many years. A World War I memorial cross was erected at the junction of Hospital Road and Knollys Road in 1923. The design incorporated the division's insignia as the memorial rested on a central red star flanked by two white stars. A memorial tablet was placed in the Royal Garrison Church, listing the units that fought with the division during World War I, and also incorporating the three stars. A set of memorial gates to 1st and 2nd Divisions was unveiled on 29 July 1958.

While the division was stationed in Malay after World War II, the Kohima War Cemetery was established in India and dedicated to the division.

On 24 June 1987 Queen Elizabeth II unveiled a memorial to the division in York, its later base, at the site of the medieval palace of the Archbishop of York.

== See also ==
- List of commanders of the British 2nd Division
- List of orders of battle for the British 2nd Division
- List of Victoria Cross recipients from the British 2nd Division
- List of British divisions in World War I
- List of British divisions in World War II
- British Army Order of Battle (September 1939)
- Outline of the British Army at the end of the Cold War
- British Army Structure in 2010
