= Boulogne-sur-Helpe =

- Commune
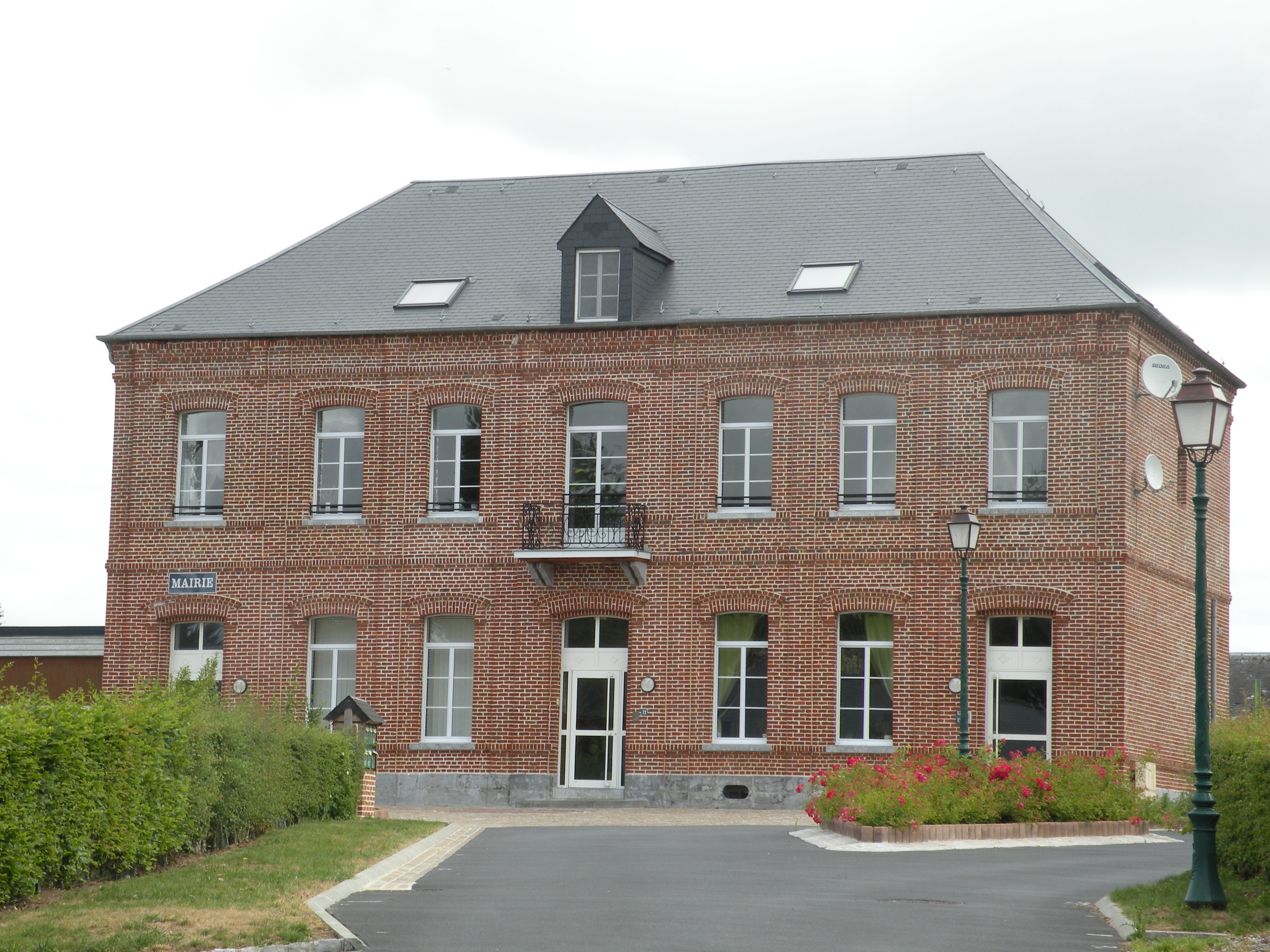
- The town hall in Boulogne-sur-Helpe

- Coat of arms
- Location of Boulogne-sur-Helpe
- Location within France Location within Hauts-de-France
- Coordinates: 50°04′47″N 3°53′47″E
- Country: France
- Region: Hauts-de-France
- Department: Nord
- Arrondissement: Avesnes-sur-Helpe
- Canton: Avesnes-sur-Helpe
- Intercommunality: CC Cœur de l'Avesnois

Government
  - Mayor (2020–2026): Nadine Majka
- Area^{1}: 8.7 km^{2} (3.4 sq mi)
- Elevation: 177 m (581 ft)
- Highest elevation: 207 m (679 ft)
- Lowest elevation: 144 m (472 ft)
- Population (2023): 291
  - Density: 33/km^{2} (87/sq mi)
- Time zone: UTC+01:00 (CET)
  - Summer (DST): UTC+02:00 (CEST)
- INSEE/Postal code: 59093 /59440
- ^{1} French Land Register data, which excludes lakes, ponds, glaciers > 1 km^{2} (0.386 sq mi or 247 acres) and river estuaries.

Boulogne-sur-Helpe (French pronunciation: [bulɔɲ syʁ ɛlp], literally Boulogne on Helpe) is a commune in the Nord department in northern France.

== Population ==
Historical population
Year	Pop.	±% p.a.
1968	387	—
1975	346	−1.59%
1982	315	−1.33%
1990	319	+0.16%
1999	317	−0.07%
2007	329	+0.47%
2012	326	−0.18%
2017	339	+0.79%
2023	291	−2.51%
Source: INSEE

== Heraldry ==
Arms of Boulogne-sur-Helpe	The arms of Boulogne-sur-Helpe are blazoned : Argent, 3 fesses gules. (Boulogne-sur-Helpe and Petit-Fayt use the same arms.)

== See also ==
- Communes of the Nord department
