= Petit-Fayt =

- Commune
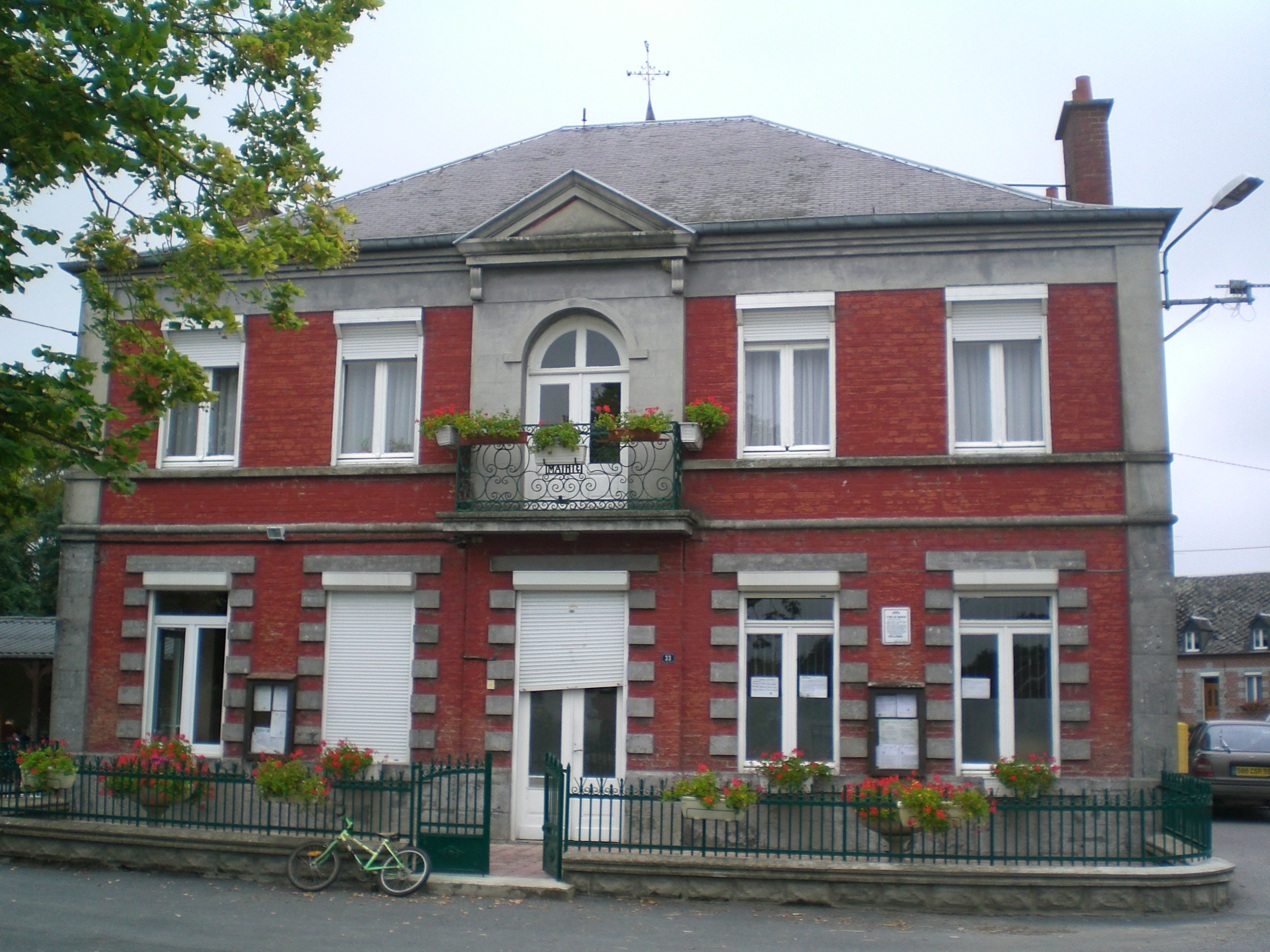
- The town hall in Petit-Fayt

- Coat of arms
- Location of Petit-Fayt
- Location within France Location within Hauts-de-France
- Coordinates: 50°06′13″N 3°49′12″E
- Country: France
- Region: Hauts-de-France
- Department: Nord
- Arrondissement: Avesnes-sur-Helpe
- Canton: Avesnes-sur-Helpe
- Intercommunality: Cœur de l'Avesnois

Government
  - Mayor (2020–2026): Claude Royaux
- Area^{1}: 8.16 km^{2} (3.15 sq mi)
- Elevation: 191 m (627 ft)
- Highest elevation: 197 m (646 ft)
- Lowest elevation: 139 m (456 ft)
- Population (2023): 286
  - Density: 35.0/km^{2} (90.8/sq mi)
- Time zone: UTC+01:00 (CET)
  - Summer (DST): UTC+02:00 (CEST)
- INSEE/Postal code: 59461 /59244
- ^{1} French Land Register data, which excludes lakes, ponds, glaciers > 1 km^{2} (0.386 sq mi or 247 acres) and river estuaries.

Petit-Fayt is a commune in the Nord department in northern France.

== Heraldry ==
Arms of Petit-Fayt	The arms of Petit-Fayt are blazoned : Argent, 3 fesses gules. (Boulogne-sur-Helpe and Petit-Fayt use the same arms.)

== See also ==
- Communes of the Nord department
