= 1921 =

1921 in various calendars
- Gregorian calendar: 1921; MCMXXI
- Ab urbe condita: 2674
- Armenian calendar: 1370; ԹՎ ՌՅՀ
- Assyrian calendar: 6671
- Baháʼí calendar: 77–78
- Balinese saka calendar: 1842–1843
- Bengali calendar: 1327–1328
- Berber calendar: 2871
- British Regnal year: 11 Geo. 5 – 12 Geo. 5
- Buddhist calendar: 2465
- Burmese calendar: 1283
- Byzantine calendar: 7429–7430
- Chinese calendar: 庚申年 (Metal Monkey); 4618 or 4411 — to — 辛酉年 (Metal Rooster); 4619 or 4412
- Coptic calendar: 1637–1638
- Discordian calendar: 3087
- Ethiopian calendar: 1913–1914
- Hebrew calendar: 5681–5682
- Hindu calendars
- Vikram Samvat: 1977–1978
- Shaka Samvat: 1842–1843
- Kali Yuga: 5021–5022
- Holocene calendar: 11921
- Igbo calendar: 921–922
- Iranian calendar: 1299–1300
- Islamic calendar: 1339–1340
- Japanese calendar: Taishō 10 (大正１０年)
- Javanese calendar: 1851–1852
- Juche calendar: 10
- Julian calendar: Gregorian minus 13 days
- Korean calendar: 4254
- Minguo calendar: ROC 10 民國10年
- Nanakshahi calendar: 453
- Thai solar calendar: 2463–2464
- Tibetan calendar: ལྕགས་ཕོ་སྤྲེ་ལོ་ (male Iron-Monkey); 2047 or 1666 or 894 — to — ལྕགས་མོ་བྱ་ལོ་ (female Iron-Bird); 2048 or 1667 or 895

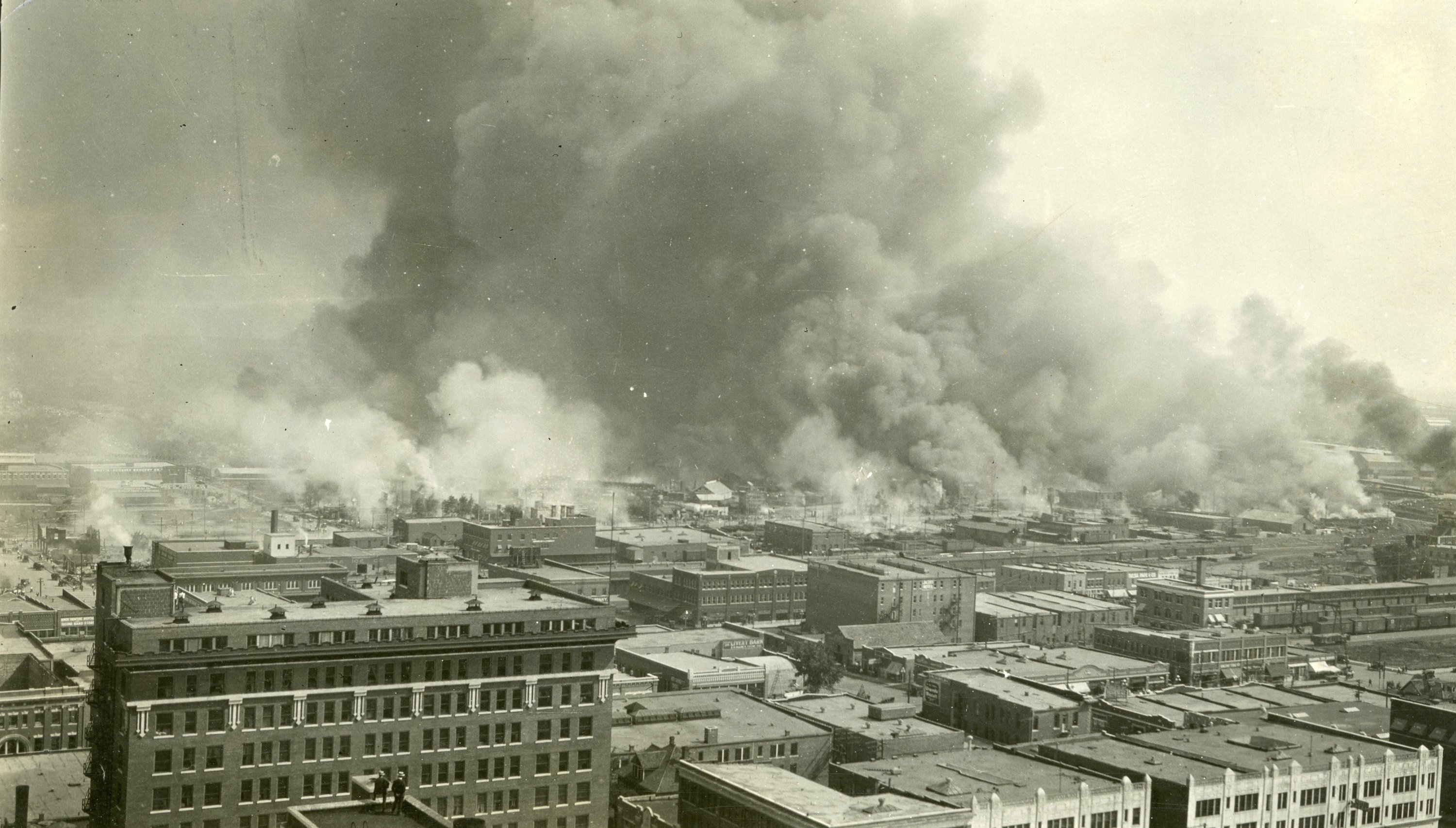
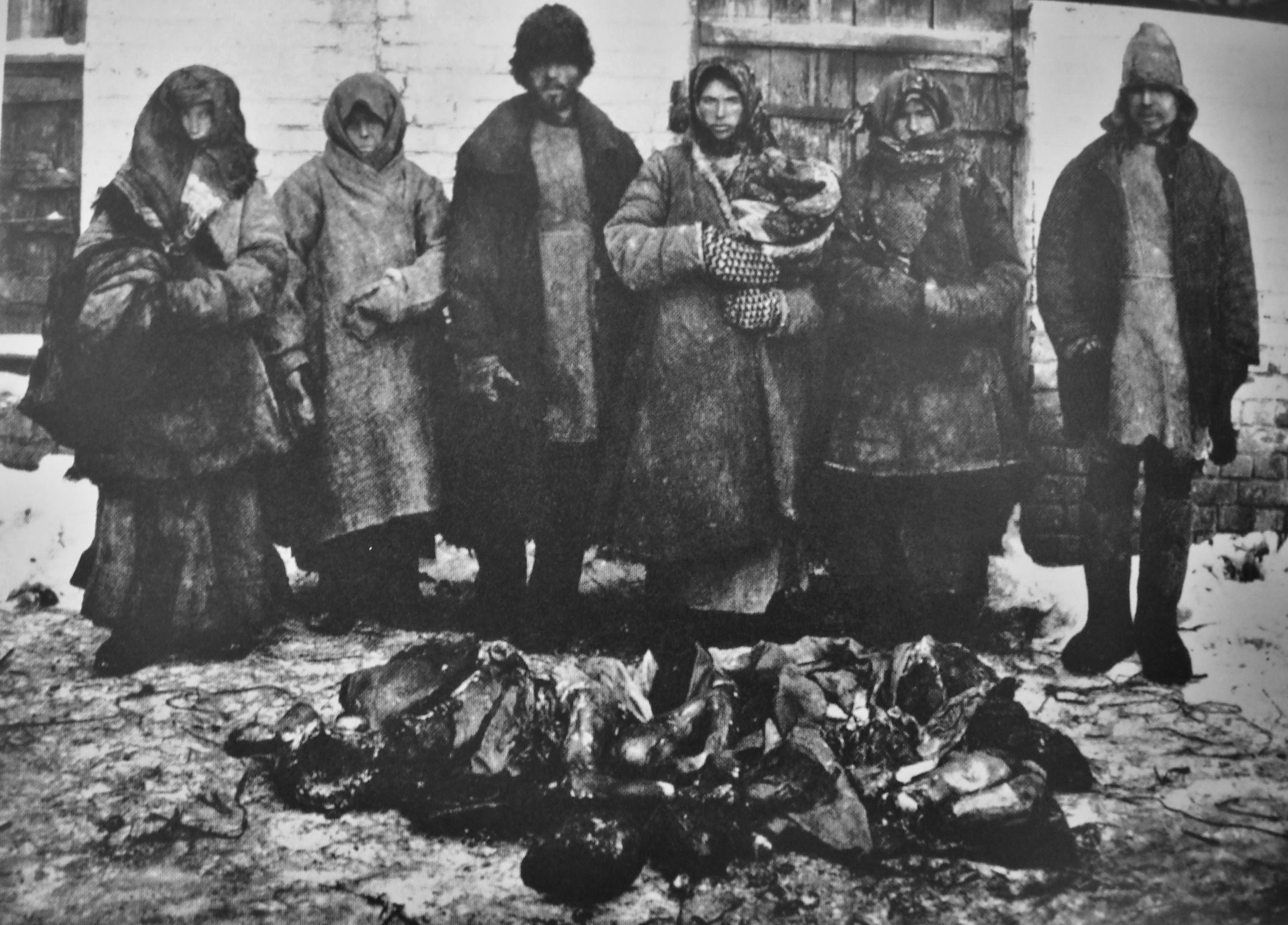
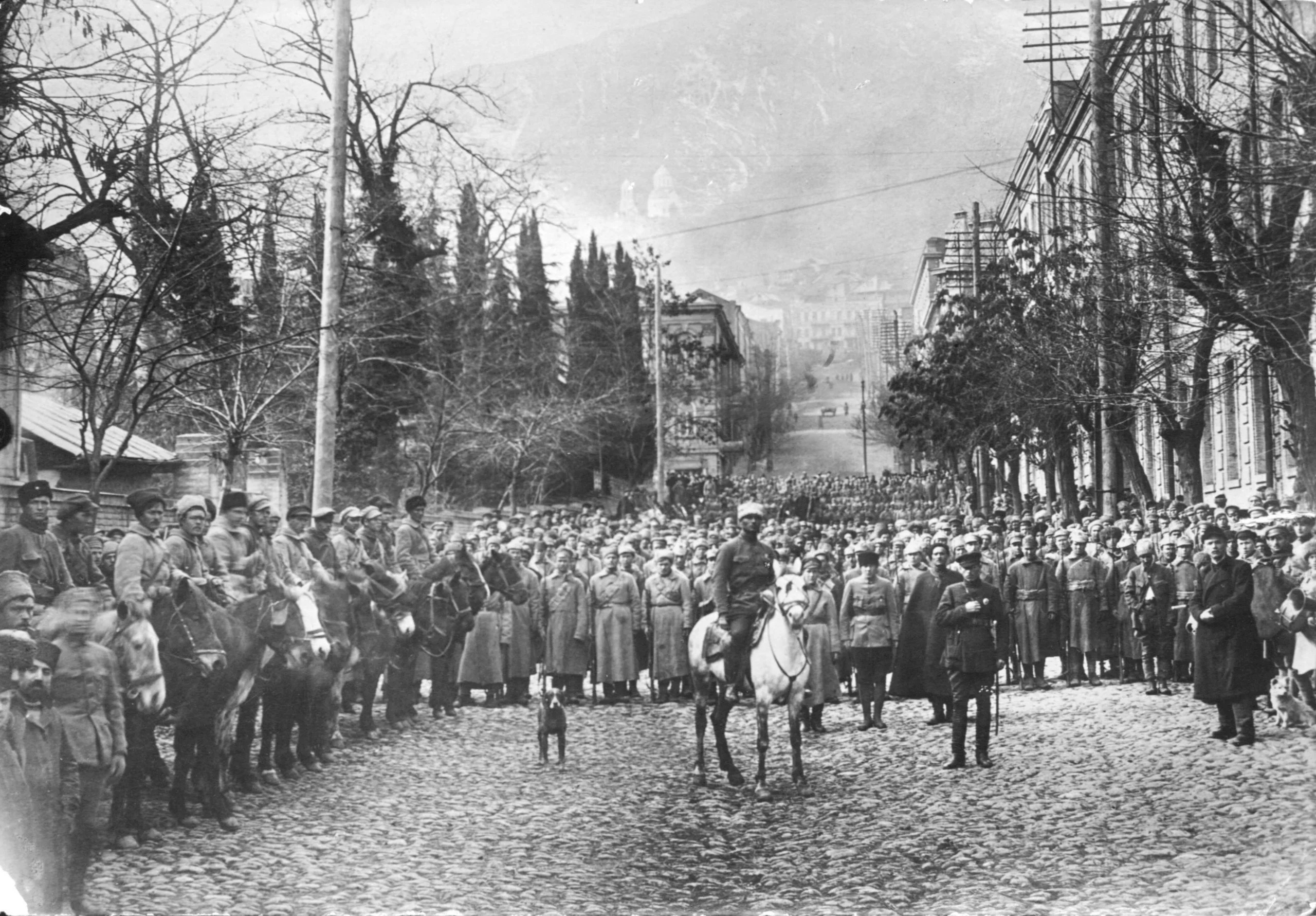
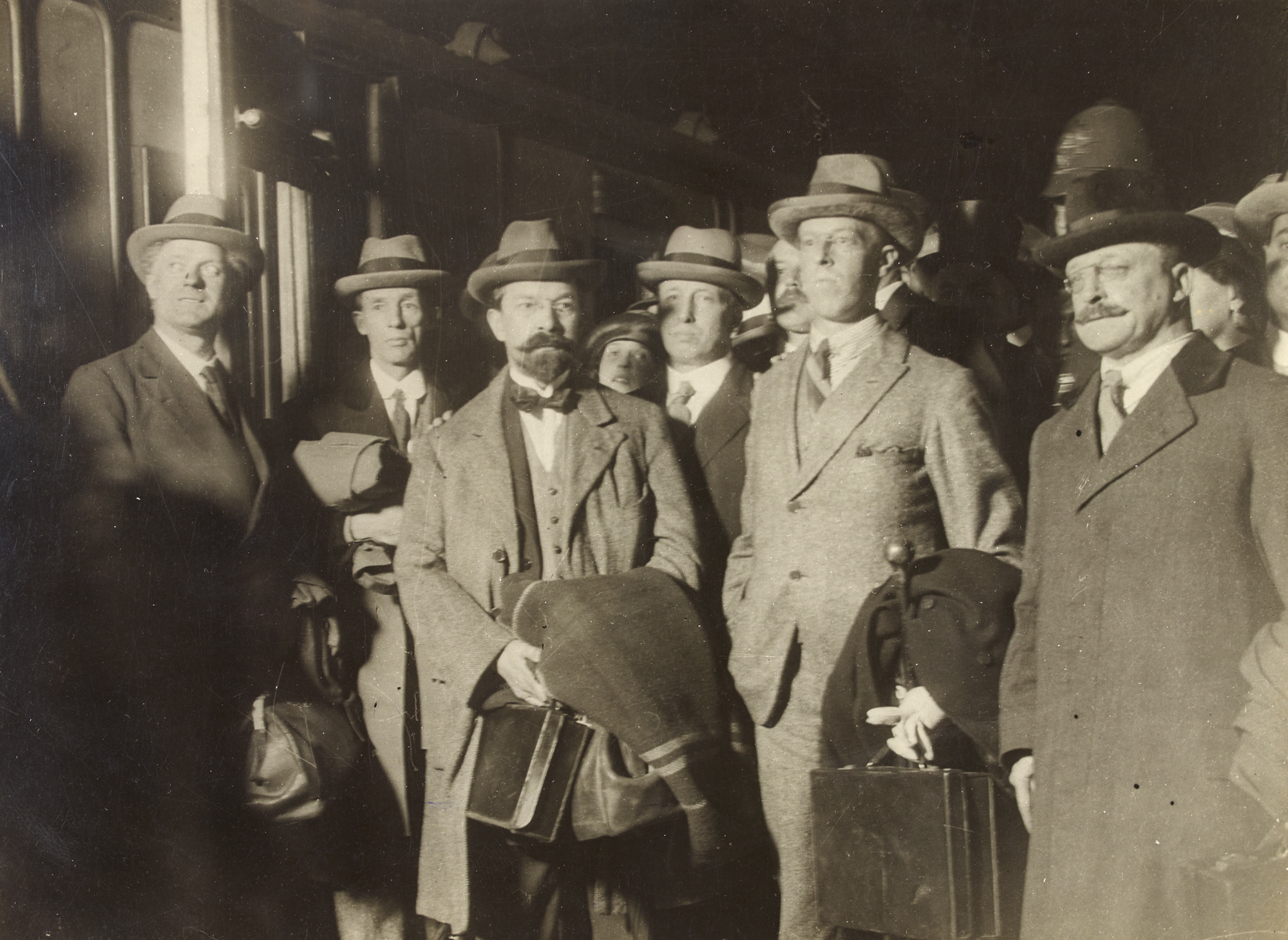
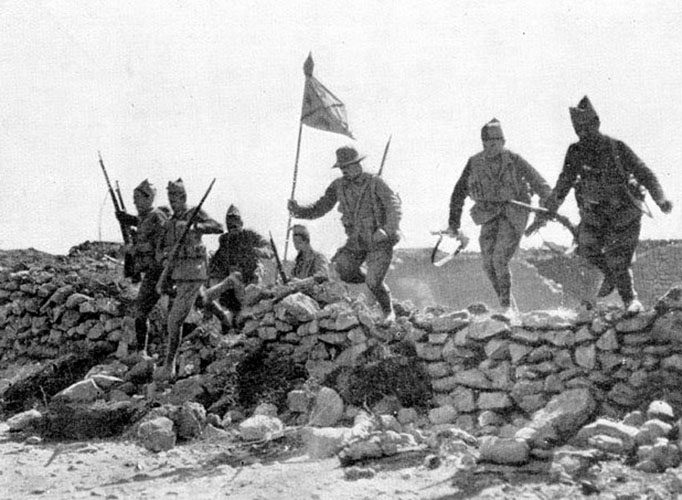
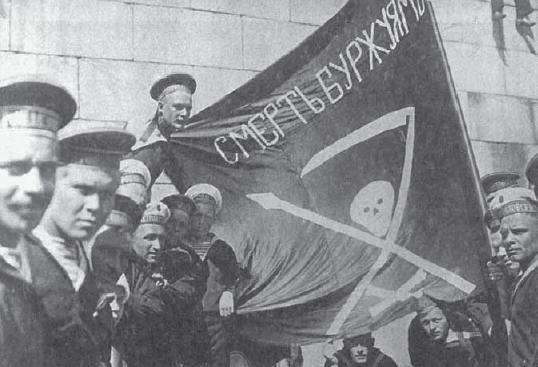
From top to bottom, left to right:
- The Tulsa race massacre destroys the Greenwood District of Tulsa, Oklahoma, killing hundreds and razing thousands of homes and businesses;
- The Russian famine of 1921–1922 kills an estimated five million in the Russian Soviet Federative Socialist Republic, prompting limited international aid;
- The Red Army invasion of Georgia brings the Democratic Republic of Georgia under Soviet control;
- The Anglo-Irish Treaty ends the Irish War of Independence, creating the Irish Free State as a self-governing dominion;
- The Rif War begins as Berber tribes led by Abd el-Krim resist Spanish colonial rule in northern Morocco;
- The Kronstadt rebellion sees Soviet sailors and workers rise against Bolshevik rule before being crushed by the Red Army.

1921 (MCMXXI) was a common year starting on Saturday of the Gregorian calendar and a common year starting on Friday of the Julian calendar, the 1921st year of the Common Era (CE) and Anno Domini (AD) designations, the 921st year of the 2nd millennium, the 21st year of the 20th century, and the 2nd year of the 1920s decade. As of the start of 1921, the Gregorian calendar was 13 days ahead of the Julian calendar, which remained in localized use until 1923.

== Events ==
=== January ===
- January 2 – The Spanish liner Santa Isabel breaks in two and sinks off Villa Garcia, Mexico, with the loss of 244 of the 300 people on board.
- January 16 – The Marxist Left in Slovakia and the Transcarpathian Ukraine holds its founding congress in Ľubochňa.
- January 17 – The first recorded public performance of the illusion of "sawing a woman in half" is given by English stage magician P. T. Selbit at the Finsbury Park Empire variety theatre in London.
- January 20 – British K-class submarine HMS K5 sinks in the English Channel; all 57 on board are lost.
- January 21 – The full-length silent comedy drama film The Kid, written, produced, directed by and starring Charlie Chaplin (in his Tramp character), with Jackie Coogan, is released in the United States.
- January 25 – Italian battleship Leonardo da Vinci is righted in Taranto Harbour.

=== February ===
- February 12 – Red Army invasion of Georgia: The Democratic Republic of Georgia is invaded by forces of Bolshevist Russia.
- February 19 – The French Third Republic and Second Polish Republic form a defensive alliance.
- February 20 – The Young Communist League of Czechoslovakia is founded.
- February 21
  - 1921 Persian coup d'état: Rezā Khan and Zia'eddin Tabatabaee stage a coup d'état in Qajar dynasty Iran.
  - Conference of London of 1921–1922 convenes in an attempt to resolve problems arising from the dissolution of the Ottoman Empire.
- February 23 – The moderately conservative public official Oscar von Sydow takes over the Swedish premiership from Baron Louis De Geer the Younger.
- February 25 – Red Army invasion of Georgia: The Red Army enters the Georgian capital Tbilisi and occupies the country, installing a new government and proclaiming the Georgian Soviet Republic.
- February 27 – A Socialist congress at Vienna ends with the International Working Union of Socialist Parties founded.
- February 28 – The Kronstadt rebellion is initiated by sailors of the Soviet Navy's Baltic Fleet.

=== March ===
- March – The Group Settlement Scheme in Western Australia begins.
- March 1
  - The city of Kiryū, located in Gunma Prefecture, Japan, is founded.
  - The Australia national cricket team, led by Warwick Armstrong, becomes the first to complete a whitewash of the touring England team in The Ashes, something that will not be repeated for 86 years.
- March 5 – Irish War of Independence: Clonbanin ambush: A force of about 100 Irish Republican Army members attacks a British Army convoy of 40 soldiers, killing several, including Brigadier General Cumming.
- March 6 – The Allied Powers force Germany to pay war reparations.
- March 8 – Spanish Premier Eduardo Dato e Iradier is assassinated while exiting the parliament building in Madrid.
- March 9 – Cilicia Peace Treaty is signed between the French Third Republic and the Turkish National Movement in an attempt to end the Franco-Turkish War.
- March 12 – The İstiklâl Marşı (Independence March), the Turkish national anthem, is officially adopted.
- March 13 – Occupation of Mongolia: The Russian White Army captures Mongolia from China; Roman von Ungern-Sternberg declares himself ruler.
- March 14 – Armenian Soghomon Tehlirian assassinates Mehmed Talaat, former Interior Minister of the Ottoman Empire, in Charlottenburg, Berlin.
- March 16
  - Treaty of Moscow establishes friendly relations between the Government of the Grand National Assembly of Turkey and the Russian Socialist Federative Soviet Republic.
  - Six Irish Republican Army men of the Forgotten Ten are hanged in Mountjoy Prison, Dublin.
- March 17
  - The Red Army crushes the Kronstadt rebellion, and a number of sailors flee to Finland.
  - Marie Stopes opens the first birth control clinic in the British Empire in London, UK.
  - The Second Polish Republic adopts the March Constitution.
- March 18 – The second Peace of Riga ends the Polish–Soviet War. A permanent border is established between the Polish and Soviet states.
- March 20 – Upper Silesia votes for re-annexation to Germany.
- March 21
  - The New Economic Policy starts in Soviet Russia.
  - Irish War of Independence: Headford Ambush – The Irish Republican Army kills at least 9 British Army troops.
- March 24 – The 1921 Women's Olympiad (the first international women's sports event) begins in Monte Carlo.
- March 31
  - Abkhazia becomes the Socialist Soviet Republic of Abkhazia.
  - The British government formally returns the coal mines from wartime control to their private owners, who demand wage cuts; in response, the Miners' Federation of Great Britain calls on its partner trade unions in the Triple Alliance to join it in strike action, leading in turn to the government declaring a state of emergency for the first time under the Emergency Powers Act 1920. On April 1, a lockout of striking coal miners begins.

=== April ===
- April 11 – The Emirate of Transjordan is created under British Mandate, with Abdullah I as emir.
- April 15 – "Black Friday" in Britain: transport union members of the 'Triple Alliance' refuse to support national strike action by coal miners.
- April 20 – Ferenc Molnár's play Liliom is first produced in English on Broadway. The play would later be adapted as the musical Carousel.

=== May ===
- May 1–7 – Jaffa riots: Riots at Jaffa, Mandatory Palestine result in 47 Jewish and 48 Arab deaths.
- May 2–July 5 – Third Silesian Uprising: Poles in Upper Silesia rise against the Germans.
- May 3 – The province of Northern Ireland is created within the United Kingdom.
- May 5
  - London Schedule of Payments sets out the World War I reparations payable by the German Weimar Republic and other countries considered successors to the Central Powers – 132 billion gold marks ($33 billion), in annual installments of 2.5 billion.
  - Chanel No. 5 perfume launched by Coco Chanel.
  - Only 13 paying spectators attend the football match between Leicester City and Stockport County F.C. in England, the lowest attendance in The Football League's history.
- May 6 – The German-Soviet Provisional Agreement is signed: Germany recognises the Soviet government in the RSFSR.
- May 14–15 – The major May 1921 geomagnetic storm occurs.
- May 14–17 – Violent anti-European riots occur in Cairo and Alexandria, Egypt.
- May 16 – The Communist Party of Czechoslovakia is founded.
- May 19 – The Emergency Quota Act is passed by the United States Congress, establishing national quotas on immigration. Because this drastically limits immigration from Eastern Europe, Jews emigrating from there begin to prefer Palestine as a destination rather than the U.S.
- May 22 – In the first golf international between the two countries, the United States beats the United Kingdom 9 rounds to 3.
- May 23–July 16 – The Leipzig War Crimes Trials are held in Germany.
- May 24 – 1921 Irish elections: In the first Northern Ireland general election for the new Parliament of Northern Ireland, Ulster Unionists win 40 out of 52 seats. The dominant-party system here will last for fifty years.
- May 25 – Irish War of Independence: The Irish Republican Army occupies and burns the Custom House, Dublin, the centre of local government in Ireland. Five IRA men are killed, and over 80 are captured by the British Army which surrounds the building.
- May 26 – A general strike begins in Norway, begun by 120,000 workers led by Ole O. Lian.
- May 31–June 1 – Tulsa Race Massacre (Greenwood Massacre): Mobs of white residents attack black residents and businesses in Greenwood District, Tulsa, Oklahoma. The official death toll is 36, but later investigations suggest an actual figure between 100 and 300. 1,250 homes are destroyed and roughly 6,000 African Americans imprisoned in one of the worst incidents of mass racial violence in the United States.

=== June ===
- June 3 – The death penalty is abolished in Sweden.
- June 10 – Paris declaration: Representatives of the three states of Transcaucasia and the North Caucasus (the Armenian, Azerbaijani and Georgian Socialist Soviet Republics) proclaim their independence, establishing a customs union and military alliance, not internationally recognized.
- June 15
  - Compagnie Générale Transatlantique's liner SS Paris (1916) makes her maiden voyage from Le Havre to New York.
  - 29-year-old African American Bessie Coleman obtains her pilot's licence in France and becomes the first black woman to have a pilot's licence.
- June 21 – The International Hydrographic Bureau (IHB) is established as an agency of the League of Nations; it continues in this form until April 19, 1946.
- June 22–July 12 – The Third Congress of the Communist International takes place.
- June 27 – The first signings of Treaty 11, an agreement between George V, King of Canada, and various Canadian First Nations, are conducted at Fort Providence.
- June 28
  - The Constitutional Assembly of the Kingdom of Serbs, Croats and Slovenes passes the Vidovdan Constitution, despite a boycott of the vote by the communists, and Croat and Slovene parties.
  - The coal strike in the United Kingdom ends with the Miners' Federation of Great Britain obliged to accept pay cuts.

=== July ===
- July 1
  - The Chinese Communist Party (CCP) is founded.
  - The first BCG vaccination against tuberculosis is given, in Paris, France; the recipient is a newborn child.
- July 2 – U.S. President Warren Harding signs a joint congressional resolution, declaring an end to America's state of war with Germany, Austria and Hungary.
- July 4 – A new conservative government is formed in Italy by Ivanoe Bonomi.
- July 8 – The Red Army captures Mongolia from the White Army.
- July 9 – Bloody Sunday (1921) occurs in Belfast, Northern Ireland with 20 killings, at least 100 wounded and 200 homes destroyed.
- July 11 – The Irish War of Independence ends under the terms of the truce (signed on 9 July) which becomes effective at noon between the British Army and the Irish Republican Army.
- July 14 – A Massachusetts jury finds Nicola Sacco and Bartolomeo Vanzetti guilty of first degree murder following a widely publicized trial whose verdict will spark protests around the world.
- July 17 – The Republic of Mirdita is proclaimed near the Albanian-Serbian border, with Yugoslav support.
- July 21
  - Rif War: Battle of Annual – Spanish troops are dealt a crushing defeat at the hands of Abd el-Krim in Morocco.
  - Edward Harper, the "father of broadcasting" in Ceylon, arrives in Colombo to take up his post as Chief Engineer of the Ceylon Telegraph Department.
- July 23 – 1st National Congress of the Chinese Communist Party opens in Shanghai.
- July 26 – U.S. President Warren G. Harding receives Princess Fatima of Afghanistan who is escorted by imposter Stanley Clifford Weyman.
- July 27 – Researchers at the University of Toronto, led by biochemist Frederick Banting, announce the discovery of the hormone insulin.
- July 29 – Adolf Hitler becomes Führer of the Nazi Party in Germany.

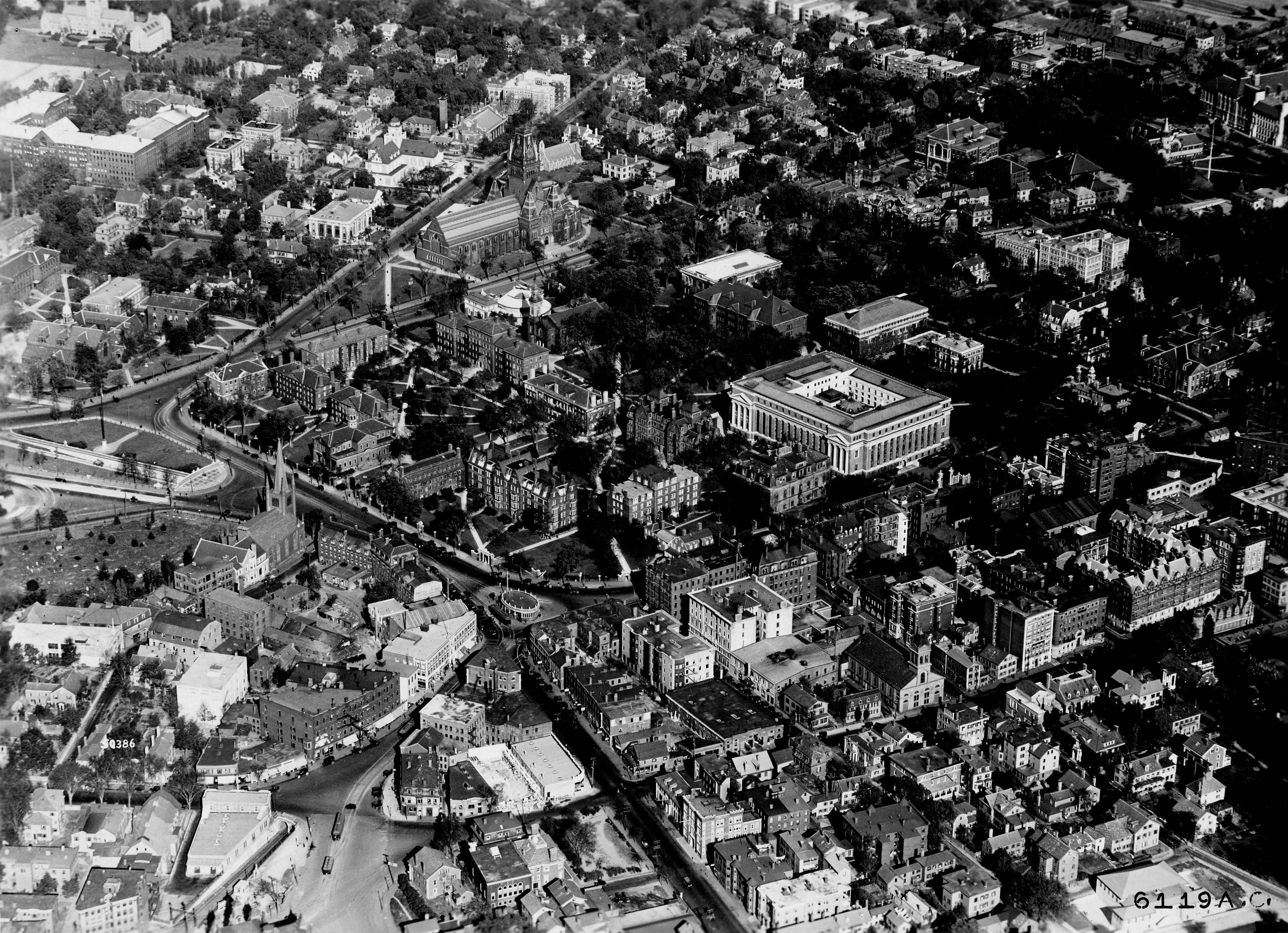
An aerial view of Harvard Square in 1921.

=== August ===
- August 5 – The first radio baseball game is broadcast: Harold Arlin announces the Pirates-Phillies game from Forbes Field over Westinghouse KDKA in Pittsburgh.
- August 11
  - Franklin D. Roosevelt's paralytic illness strikes while he is vacationing; on August 25 he is diagnosed with polio and aged 39 becomes permanently disabled.
  - The temperature reaches 39 degrees Celsius in Breslau; the heat wave continues elsewhere in Europe as well.
- August 16 – The Times newspaper in London begins a series of articles, written by its Constantinople correspondent Philip Graves, exposing The Protocols of the Elders of Zion as a forgery.
- August 23 – King Faisal I of Iraq is crowned in Baghdad.
- August 24 – R38-class airship ZR-2 explodes on her fourth test flight near Kingston upon Hull, England, killing 44 of the 49 Anglo-American crew on board.
- August 25 – The Battle of Blair Mountain, the largest labor uprising in United States history and the country's largest peacetime armed uprising, begins in Logan County, West Virginia as part of the Coal Wars, continuing until September 2.
- August 26
  - Rising prices cause major riots in Munich.
  - Following the assassination of former Finance Minister Matthias Erzberger by right-wing terrorists, the German government declares martial law.

=== September ===
- September 1 – Poplar Rates Rebellion: Nine members of the borough council of Poplar, London, are arrested.
- September 8 – Margaret Gorman, 16, wins the Golden Mermaid trophy at a beauty pageant in Atlantic City, New Jersey; officials later dub her the first Miss America.
- September 13 – White Castle hamburger restaurant opens in Wichita, Kansas, foundation of the world's first fast food chain.
- September 21 – The Oppau explosion occurs at BASF's nitrate factory in Oppau, Germany; over 500 are killed.
- September 28 – Sauerländer Heimatbund is founded in Meschede, Germany.

=== October ===
- October 3 – Simko, the leader of the Shikak tribe, kills the Iranian commander Colonel Mohammad Taqi Pessian by beheading him in the Battle of Jafarabad, which is the first incident of his rebellion.
- October 5
  - The World Series baseball game in North America is first broadcast on the radio, by Newark, New Jersey, station WJZ, Pittsburgh station KDKA, and a group of other commercial and amateur stations throughout the eastern United States.
  - Constitution of Liechtenstein granted by Johann II, Prince of Liechtenstein, making the country a constitutional monarchy.
- October 7 – During his first rebellion, Simko Shikak launches an attack on the Savujbulak district of Mahabad. With a force of approximately 3,900, he attacks the gendarmes, killing 400 of them and looting the local population.
- October 8 – The first Sweetest Day is staged in Cleveland, Ohio.
- October 10 – Teaching at the University of Szeged begins, in the Kingdom of Hungary.
- October 11 – The Irish Treaty Conference opens in London.
- October 13
  - The Treaty of Kars is signed between the Government of the Grand National Assembly of Turkey and the Armenian, Azerbaijani and Georgian Socialist Soviet Republics in Transcaucasia, establishing common boundaries.
  - Swedish Social Democratic party leader Hjalmar Branting becomes yet again Prime Minister, after strong general election gains for his party.
- October 19 – 'Bloody Night' (Noite Sangrenta): A massacre in Lisbon claims the lives of Portuguese Prime-Minister António Granjo and other politicians.
- October 20 – Treaty of Ankara signed between the French Third Republic and the Government of the Grand National Assembly of Turkey, ending the Franco-Turkish War.
- October 21 – George Melford's wildly successful silent film The Sheik, which will propel its leading actor Rudolph Valentino to international stardom, premieres in Los Angeles.
- October 24 – In the continuing Rif War, the Spanish Army defeats rifkabyl rebels in Morocco.
- October 29 – In the United States:
  - Construction of the Link River Dam, a part of the Klamath Project in Oregon, is completed.
  - Centre College's American football team, led by quarterback Bo McMillin, defeats Harvard University 6–0, to break Harvard's five-year winning streak. For decades afterward, this is called "football's upset of the century".

=== November ===
- November 4 – After a speech by Adolf Hitler in the Hofbräuhaus in Munich (Germany), members of the Sturmabteilung ("brownshirts") physically assault his opposition.
- November 9 – The National Fascist Party (Partito Nazionale Fascista or PNF) is founded in Italy.
- November 11 – During an Armistice Day ceremony at Arlington National Cemetery, the Tomb of the Unknowns is dedicated by Warren G. Harding, President of the United States.
- November 14 – The Spanish Communist Party is founded.
- November 23 – In the United States, the Sheppard–Towner Act is signed by President Harding, providing federal funding for maternity and child care.
- November – Hyperinflation is rampant in Germany, where 263 marks are now needed to buy a single American dollar, more than 20 times greater than the 12 marks needed in April 1919.

=== December ===
- December 1 – Rising prices cause riots in Vienna.
- December 6
  - The Anglo-Irish Treaty establishing the Irish Free State, an independent nation incorporating 26 of Ireland's 32 counties, is signed in London.
  - Agnes Macphail becomes the first woman to be elected to the Canadian Parliament.
- December 13 – In the Four-Power Treaty on Insular Possessions, the Empire of Japan, United States, United Kingdom, and French Third Republic agree to recognize the status quo in the Pacific.
- December 23 – Visva-Bharati College is founded by Rabindranath Tagore in Santiniketan, Bengal Presidency, British India.
- December 29 – William Lyon Mackenzie King becomes Canada's tenth prime minister; he will serve for three non-consecutive terms until 1948.

=== Date unknown ===
- Spring – Russian famine of 1921–22 begins; roughly 5,000,000 die.
- Luxury goods brand Gucci is founded in Florence, Italy.

== Births ==
=== January ===
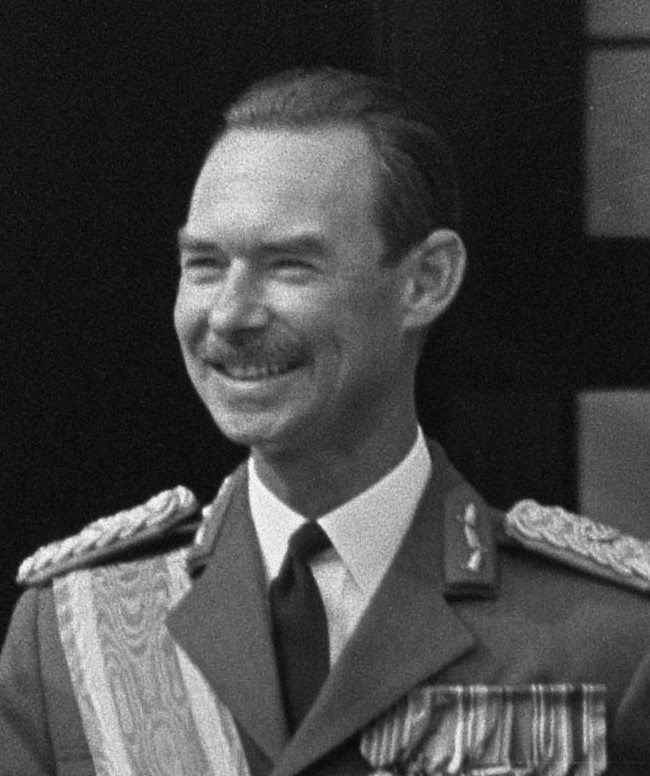
Jean, Grand Duke of Luxembourg

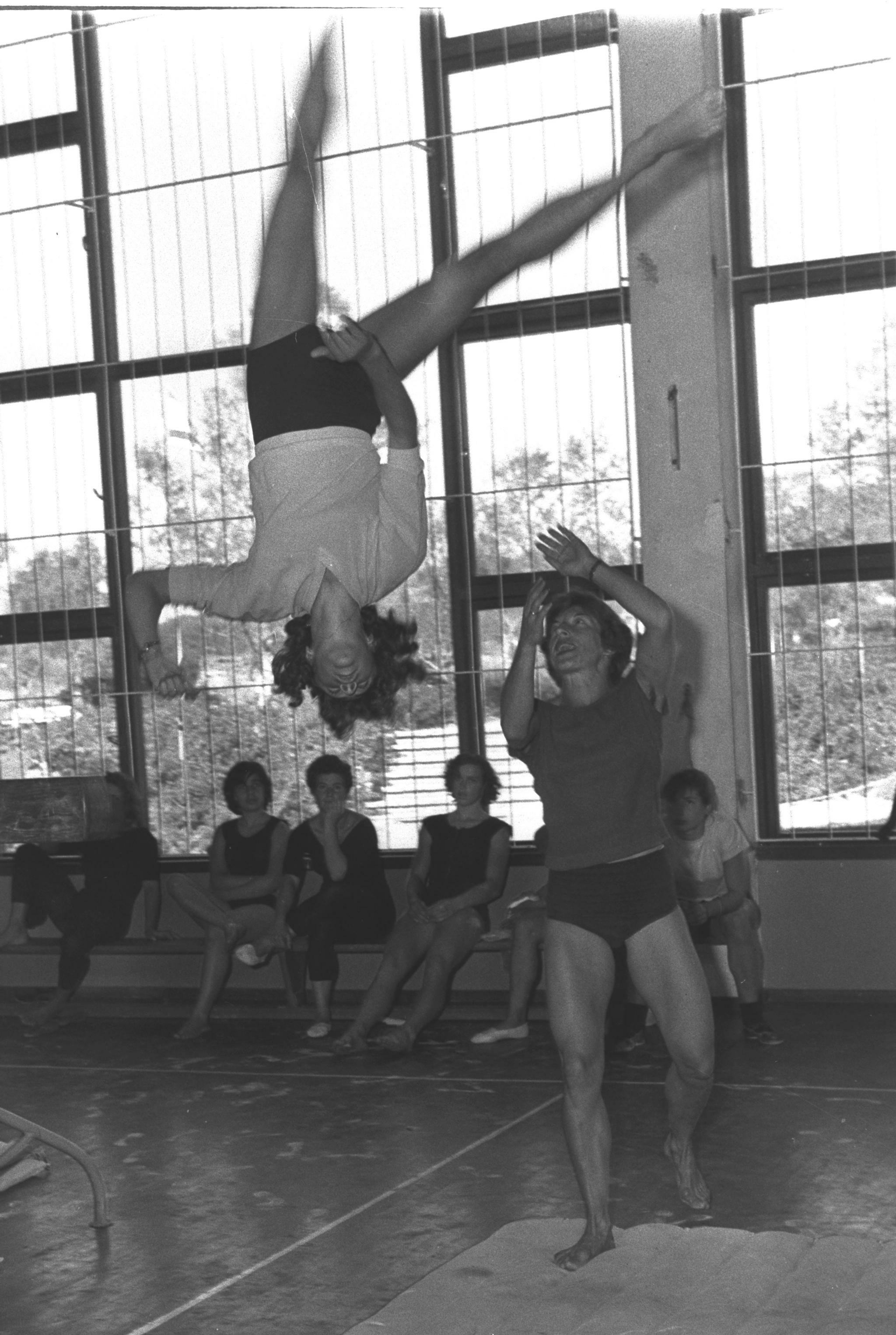
Agnes Keleti

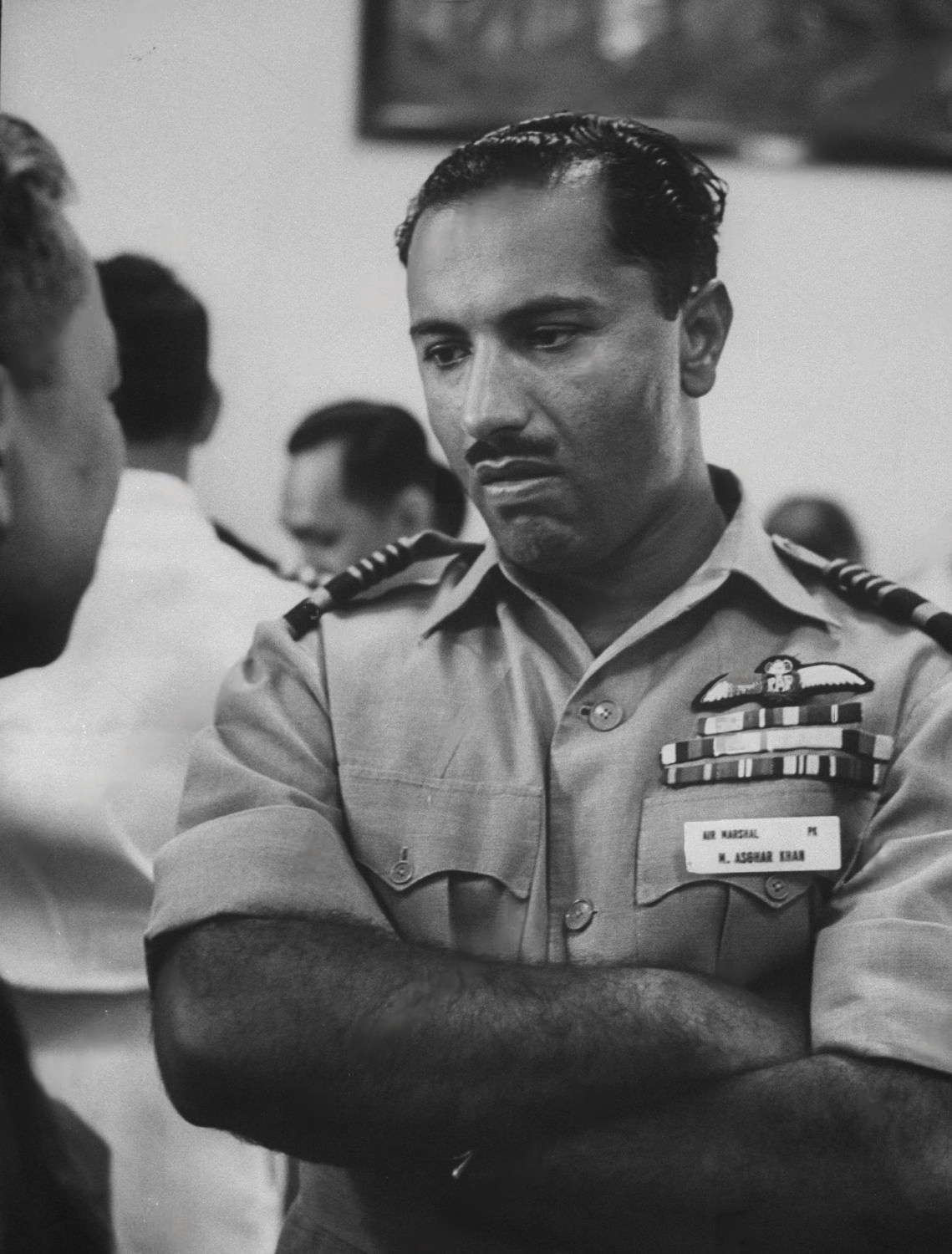
Asghar Khan

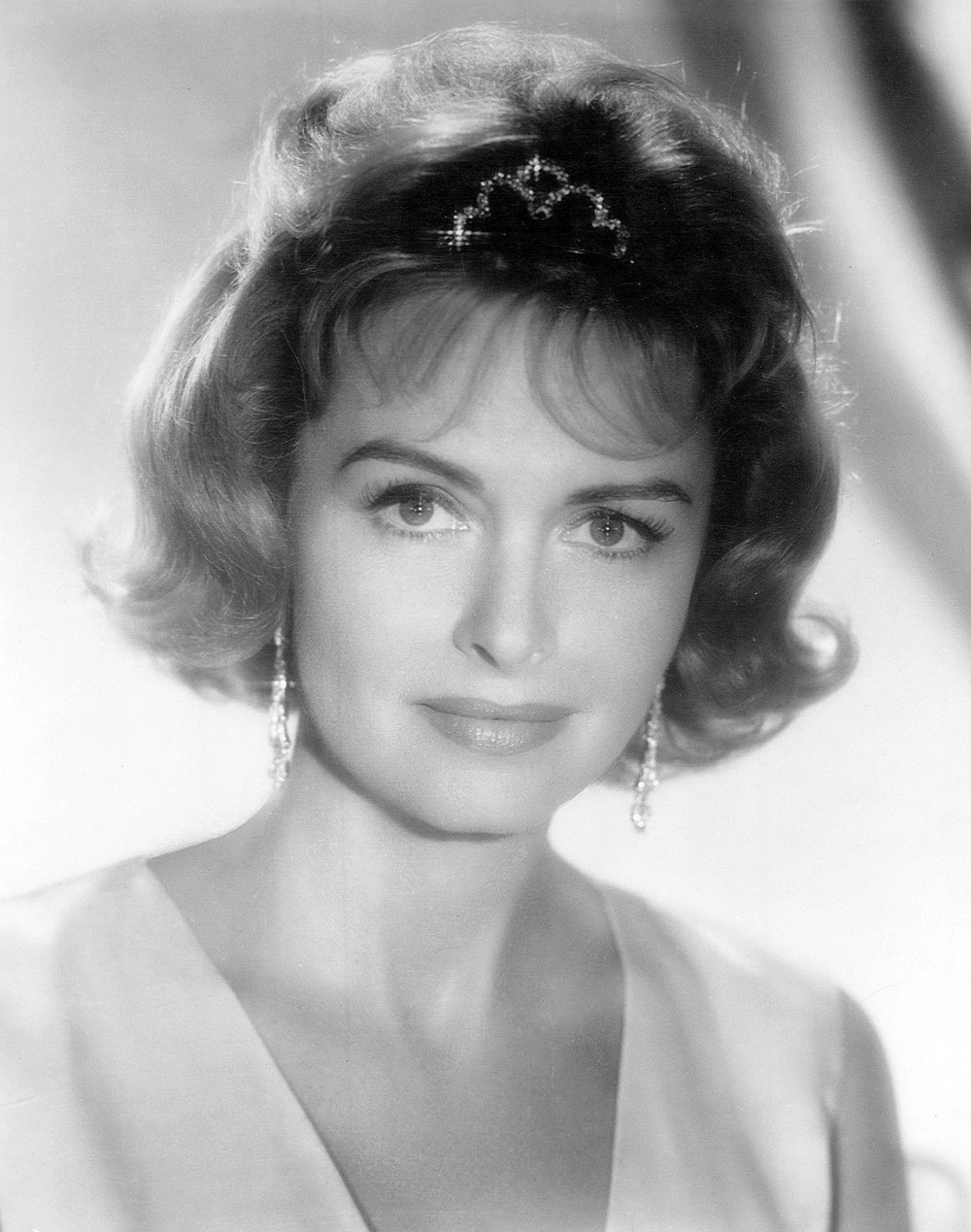
Donna Reed

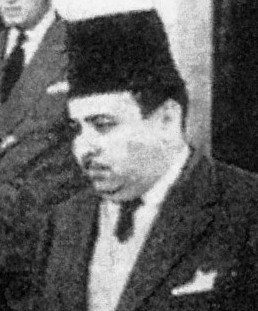
Mustafa Ben Halim

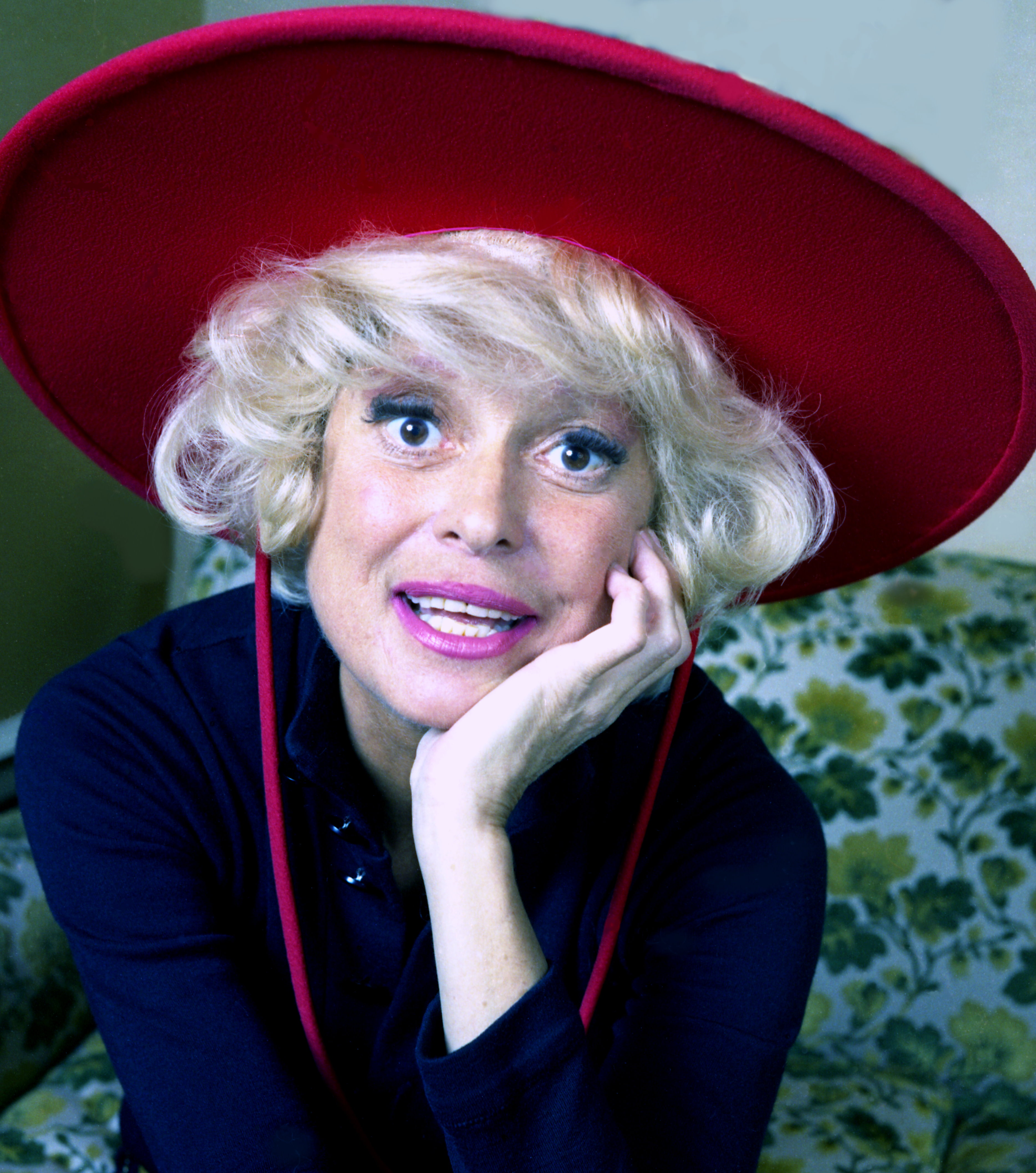
Carol Channing

- January 1
  - César Baldaccini, French sculptor (d. 1998)
  - Cliff Bourland, American athlete (d. 2018)
  - Hossein Wahid Khorasani, Iranian ayatollah (d. 2026)
  - Isma'il Raji al-Faruqi, Palestinian-American Islamic scholar (d. 1986)
- January 3
  - Bill Gold, American graphic designer (d. 2018)
  - Bob Dawson, Australian rules footballer (d. 2023)
  - Jean-Louis Koszul, French mathematician (d. 2018)
  - John Russell, American actor (d. 1991)
  - Cecil Souders, American football player (d. 2021)
- January 4 – Pedro Richter Prada, 115th Prime Minister of Peru (d. 2017)
- January 6 - Marianne Grunberg-Manago (1921–2013), Russian-born French biochemist (d. 2013)
- January 5
  - Friedrich Dürrenmatt, Swiss writer (d. 1990)
  - Jean, Grand Duke of Luxembourg (d. 2019)
- January 9 – Ágnes Keleti, Hungarian artistic gymnast (d. 2025)
- January 10 – T. M. Kaliannan, Indian politician (d. 2021)
- January 11 – Juanita M. Kreps, American government official and businesswoman (d. 2010)
- January 12 – Muriel Phillips, American nurse and author (d. 2022)
- January 14
  - Murray Bookchin, American libertarian socialist (d. 2006)
  - Roger Carré, French footballer (d. 1996)
- January 16
  - Henry Sayler, American politician (d. 2021)
  - George Thomson, Baron Thomson of Monifieth, British politician and journalist (d. 2008)
  - Shmuel Toledano, Israeli politician (d. 2022)
- January 17
  - Asghar Khan, Pakistani politician, first native Commander-in-Chief of the Pakistan Air Force, the world's youngest Air Vice Marshal at 36 and Air Marshal at 37 years old (d. 2018)
  - Epaminondas Stassinopoulos, Greek astrophysicist (d. 2022)
  - Dan Tolkowsky, Israeli Air Force commander (d. 2025)
- January 18 – Yoichiro Nambu, Japanese-American Nobel physicist (d. 2015)
- January 19
  - Rachel Dror, German teacher and Holocaust survivor (d. 2024)
  - Patricia Highsmith, American author (d. 1995)
- January 20 – John Bai Ningxian, Chinese Roman Catholic bishop (d. unknown)
- January 21
  - Jaswant Singh Marwah, Indian soldier, journalist and author
  - Howard Unruh, American spree killer (d. 2009)
- January 22 – Eleanor Owen, American playwright, actress, professor and mental health advocate (d. 2022)
- January 23
  - Hermann Baumann, Swiss Olympic freestyle wrestler (d. 1999)
  - Marija Gimbutas, Lithuanian archaeologist (d. 1994)
  - Justus Rosenberg, Polish academic (d. 2021)
- January 24 – Beatrice Mintz, American biologist (d. 2022)
- January 25 – Josef Holeček, Czech canoeist (d. 2005)
- January 26
  - Elisabeth Kirkby, English-born Australian actress, politician and radio broadcaster (d. 2026)
  - Akio Morita, Japanese businessman, co-founder of Sony (d. 1999)
  - Veikko Uusimäki, Finnish actor and theater councilor (d. 2008)
- January 27
  - Raymond E. Peet, American admiral (d. 2021)
  - Donna Reed, American actress (d. 1986)
- January 29 – Mustafa Ben Halim, Former Prime Minister of Libya (d. 2021)
- January 31
  - Carol Channing, American actress (d. 2019)
  - Abu Sayeed Chowdhury, 2nd President of Bangladesh (d. 1987)
  - Mario Lanza, American operatic tenor and actor (d. 1959)

=== February ===
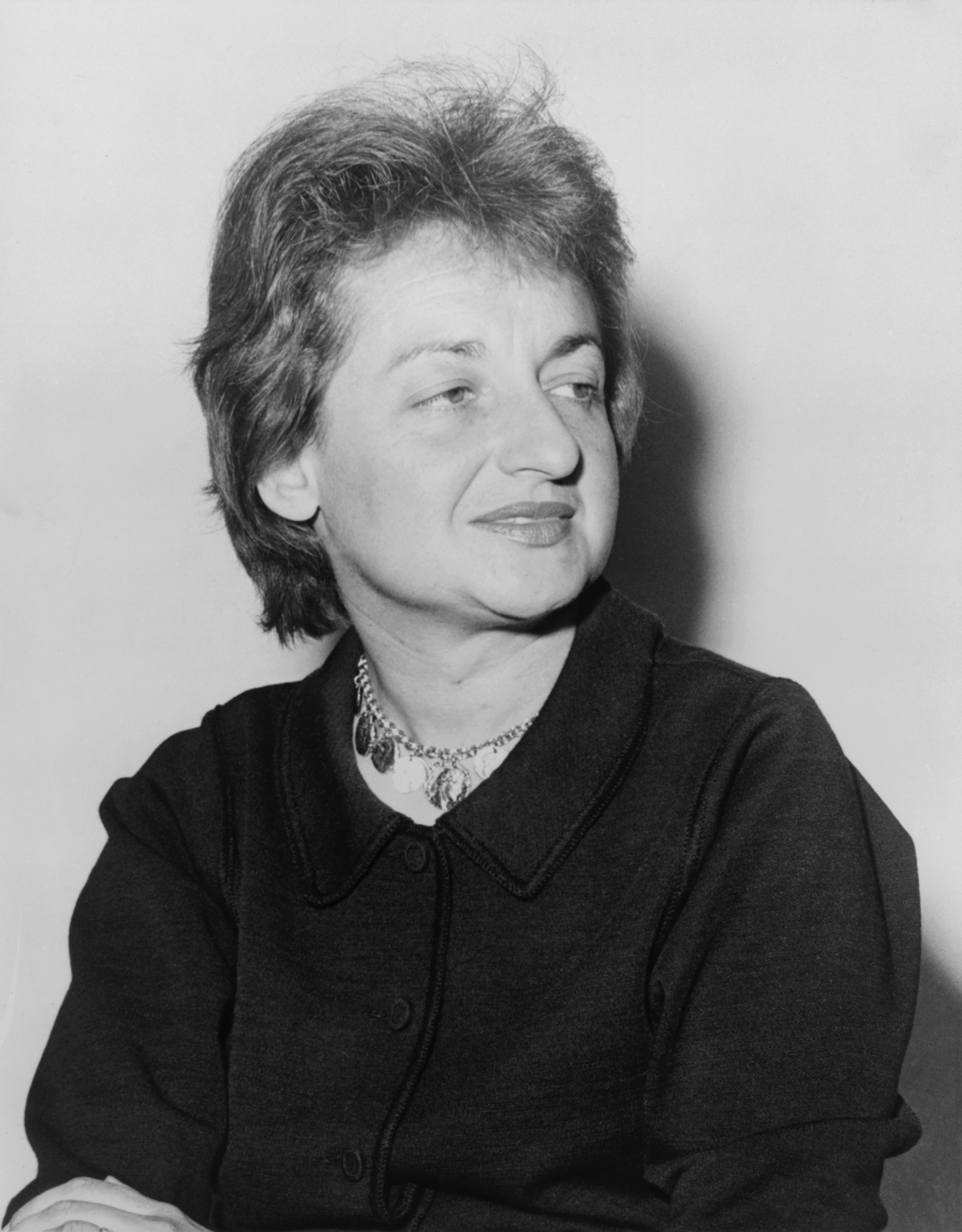
Betty Friedan

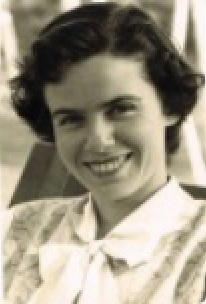
Lise Thiry

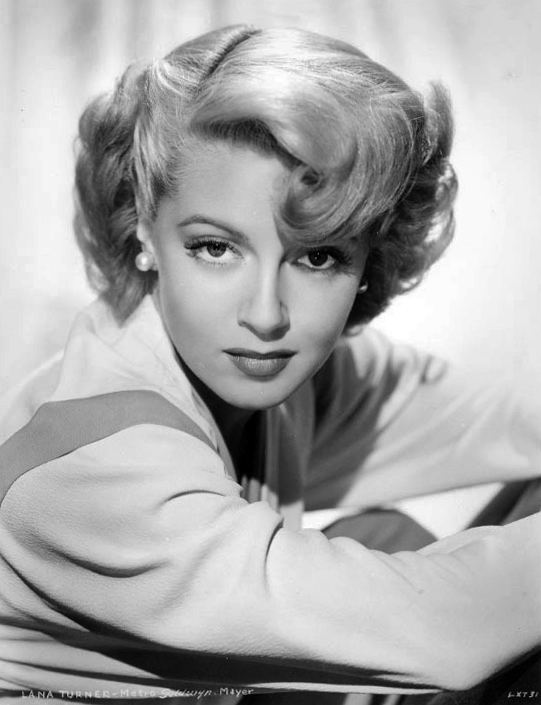
Lana Turner

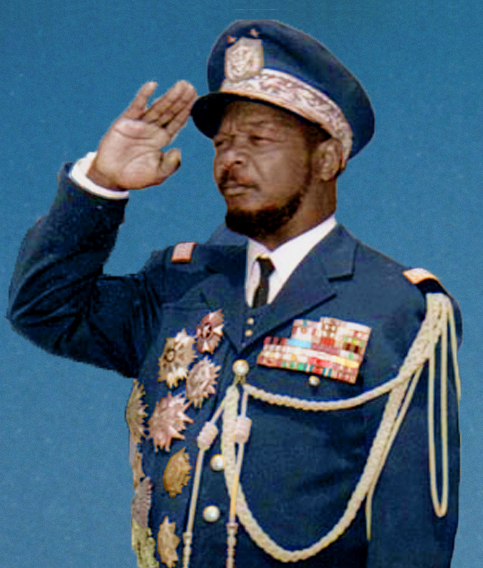
Jean-Bédel Bokassa

- February 4 – Betty Friedan, American feminist (d. 2006)
- February 5 – Lise Thiry, Belgian scientist and politician (d. 2024)
- February 6 – Mikheil Tumanishvili, Georgian theatre director, teacher (d. 1996)
- February 7 – Trude Malcorps, Dutch swimmer (d. 2026)
- February 8
  - Hans Albert, German philosopher (d. 2023)
  - Nexhmije Hoxha, widow of Albanian communist leader Enver Hoxha (d. 2020)
  - Balram Singh Rai, Guyanese politician (d. 2022)
  - Lana Turner, American actress (d. 1995)
- February 11 – Lloyd Bentsen, American politician (d. 2006)
- February 13 – Renée Doria, French operatic soprano (d. 2021)
- February 14 – Hazel McCallion, Canadian politician and businesswoman (d. 2023)
- February 16
  - John Galbraith Graham, crossword compiler (pseudonyms 'Arucaria' and 'Cinephile') and priest (d. 2013)
  - Hua Guofeng, Chairman of the Chinese Communist Party, Premier of China (d. 2008)
  - Walter Thiele, German inventor
  - Vera-Ellen, American actress and dancer (d. 1981)
- February 17
  - Muriel Coben, Canadian professional baseball, curling player (d. 1979)
  - Herbert Köfer, German actor (d. 2021)
- February 18 – Brian Faulkner, 6th Prime Minister of Northern Ireland (d. 1977)
- February 20
  - "Nature Boy" Buddy Rogers, American professional wrestler (d. 1992)
  - Alex Thomson, Scottish rugby player (d. 2010)
- February 21 – John Rawls, American liberal moral and political philosopher (d. 2002)
- February 22
  - Jean-Bédel Bokassa, 2nd President of the Central African Republic (1966–1976), Emperor of Central Africa (1976–1979) (d. 1996)
  - Wayne C. Booth, American literary critic (d. 2005)
  - Marshall Teague, American race car driver (d. 1959)
  - Giulietta Masina, Italian actress (d. 1994)
- February 24
  - Ingvar Lidholm, Swedish composer (d. 2017)
  - Abe Vigoda, American actor (d. 2016)
- February 25 – Pierre Laporte, Canadian statesman (d. 1970)
- February 26 – Betty Hutton, American actress and singer (d. 2007)
- February 27 – Eka Tjipta Widjaja, Chinese-Indonesian billionaire and businessman (d. 2019)
- February 28
  - Pierre Clostermann, French World War II pilot (d. 2006)
  - Theodor Otto Diener, Swiss-born American plant pathologist (d. 2023)

=== March ===
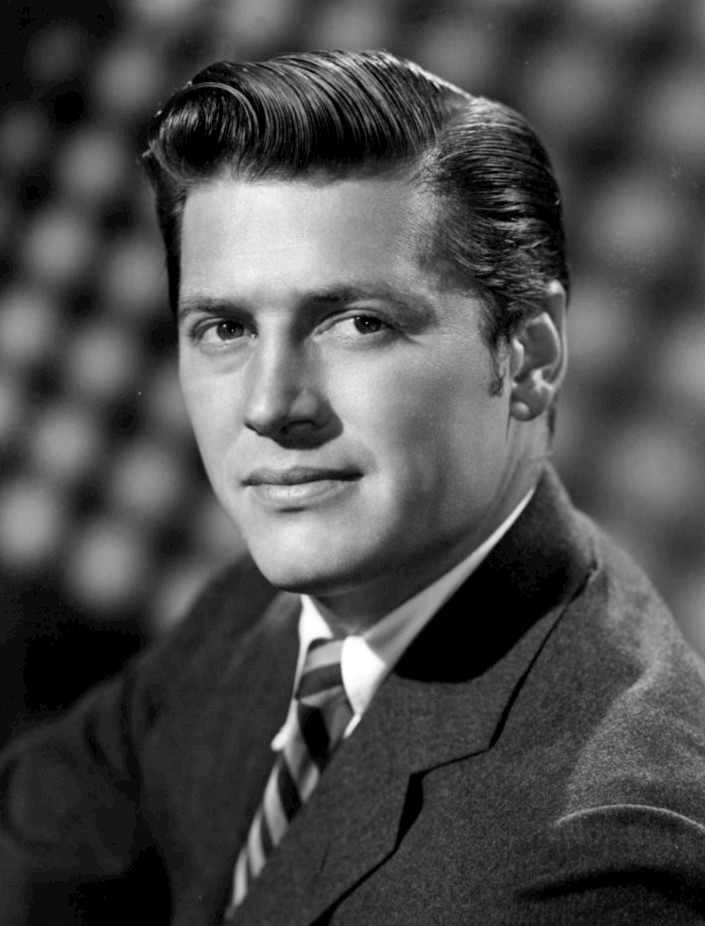
Gordon MacRae

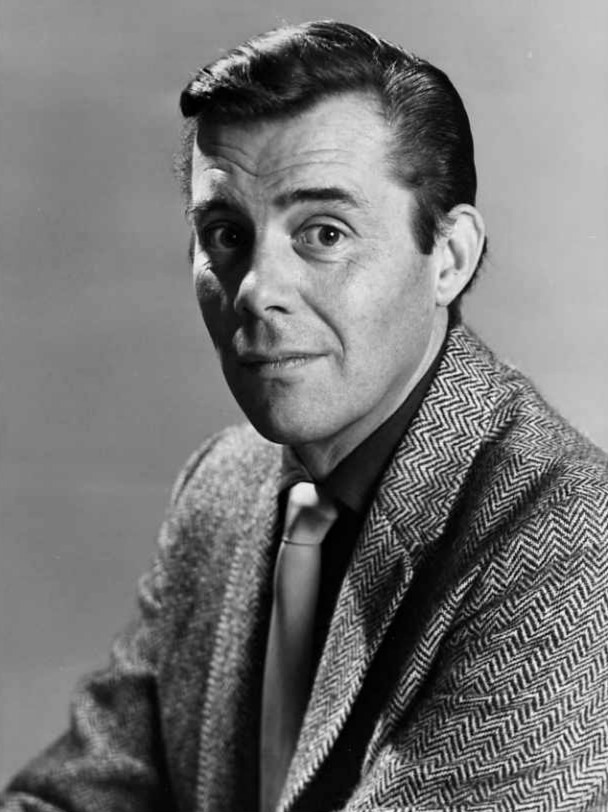
Dirk Bogarde

- March 1
  - Jack Clayton, British film director (d. 1995)
  - Terence Cardinal Cooke, American Roman Catholic prelate (d. 1983)
  - Richard Wilbur, American poet (d. 2017)
- March 2
  - Wilhelm Büsing, German equestrian (d. 2023)
  - Robert Simpson, English composer (d. 1997)
- March 3 – Diana Barrymore, American actress (d. 1960)
- March 4 – Halim El-Dabh, Egyptian-born U.S. composer, performer, ethnomusicologist and educator (d. 2017)
- March 7 – Syed Nasir Ismail, Malaysian politician (d. 1982)
- March 8 – Alan Hale Jr., American actor (Gilligan's Island) (d. 1990)
- March 9 – Evelyn M. Witkin, American geneticist (d. 2023)
- March 11
  - Frank Harary, American mathematician (d. 2005)
  - Astor Piazzolla, Argentine tango composer, bandoneon player and arranger (d. 1992)
- March 12
  - Gianni Agnelli, Italian auto executive (d. 2003)
  - Gordon MacRae, American singer, actor (d. 1986)
- March 13 – Al Jaffee, American cartoonist (d. 2023)
- March 14 – Lis Hartel, Danish equestrian (d. 2009)
- March 17
  - Meir Amit, Israeli politician, general (d. 2009)
  - Mbah Suro, Indonesian shaman and mystic (d. 1967)
- March 20
  - Amadou-Mahtar M'Bow, Senegalese educator (d. 2024)
  - Alfréd Rényi, Hungarian mathematician (d. 1970)
- March 21
  - Arthur Grumiaux, Belgian violinist (d. 1986)
  - Vasily Stalin, Soviet general (d. 1962)
  - Abdul Salam Arif, President of Iraq (d. 1966)
- March 22 – Jean Bruce, French writer (d. 1963)
- March 24
  - Wilson Harris, Guyanese writer (d. 2018)
  - Vasily Smyslov, Soviet chess player (d. 2010)
  - Franciszek Blachnicki, Polish priest (d. 1987)
- March 25
  - Simone Signoret, French actress (d. 1985)
  - Alexandra of Yugoslavia (d. 1993)
- March 27 – Hélène Berr, French writer (d. 1945)
- March 28 – Dirk Bogarde, English actor and writer (d. 1999)
- March 30 – Francesc Gras Salas, Catalan ophthalmologist (died 2022)
- March 31
  - Kurt Bertsch, Swiss footballer
  - Eduardo Cerqueira, Portuguese footballer
  - Pierre Ranzoni, French footballer (d. 1999)
  - Roy Houghton, English footballer (d. 2017)

=== April ===
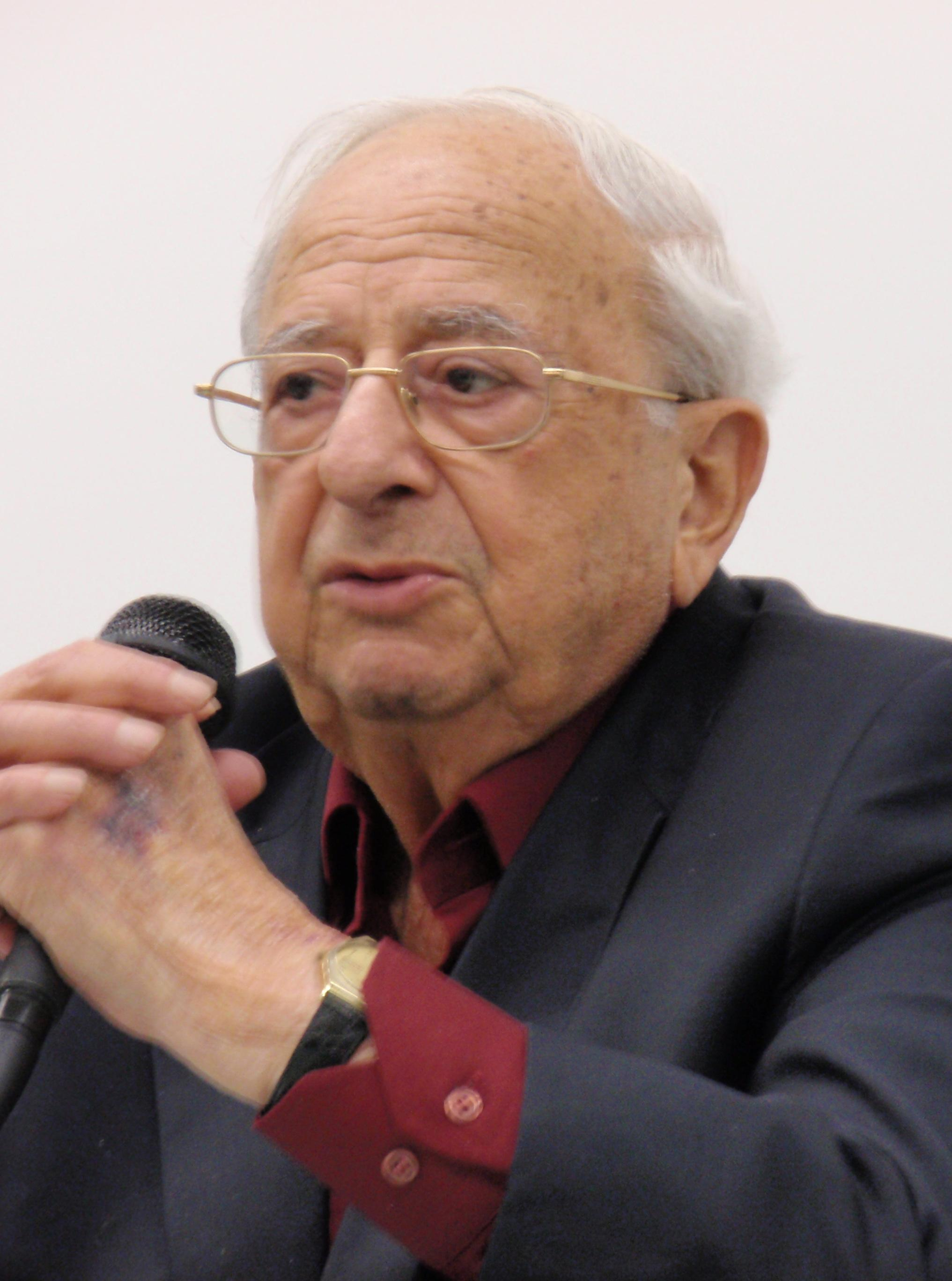
Yitzhak Navon

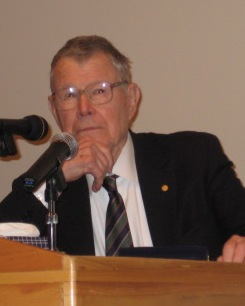
Thomas Schelling

- April 1
  - Arthur "Guitar Boogie" Smith, American musician and songwriter (d. 2014)
  - Abd-Al-Minaam Khaleel, Egyptian army general (d. 2022)
- April 3 – Darío Moreno, Turkish singer (d. 1968)
- April 6 – Wilbur Thompson, American Olympic champion shot putter (d. 2013)
- April 7
  - Robina Asti, WWII veteran, flight instructor, trans' rights activist, women's rights activist (d. 2021)
  - Bill Butler, American cinematographer (d. 2023)
- April 8
  - Giuseppe Albani, Italian footballer (d. 1989)
  - Franco Corelli, Italian opera singer (d. 2003)
  - Phyllis Latour, English-French Legion of Honour recipient (d. 2023)
- April 9
  - Jean-Marie Balestre, French sports executive (d. 2008)
  - Roger Bocquet, Swiss footballer (d. 1994)
  - Mary Jackson, African-American mathematician and engineer (d. 2005)
  - Yitzhak Navon, Israeli politician (d. 2015)
- April 10
  - Chuck Connors, American basketball and baseball player turned actor (d. 1992)
  - Elizabeth Innes, Scottish paediatric haematologist (d. 2015)
- April 11 – Maura McNiel, American feminist (d. 2020)
- April 12 – Enric Marco, Spanish imposter, fake Holocaust survivor (d. 2022)
- April 13
  - Dona Ivone Lara, Brazilian singer, composer (d. 2018)
  - Leo Mogus, American basketball player (d. 1971)
  - Louis Witten, American theoretical physicist
- April 14 – Thomas Schelling, American economist, Nobel Prize laureate (d. 2016)
- April 15 – Georgy Beregovoy, Soviet cosmonaut (d. 1995)
- April 16
  - Peter Ustinov, English actor, director and writer (d. 2004)
  - Guy Warren, Australian painter (d. 2024)
- April 17
  - Sergio Sollima, Italian director (d. 2015)
  - Melvin Storer, American shipfitter and navy diver (d. 2003)
- April 18 – Xu Yuanchong, Chinese translator (d. 2021)
- April 19
  - Robert Maxwell, American songwriter and harpist (d. 2012)
  - Roberto Tucci, Italian cardinal, theologian (d. 2015)
- April 20 – Kenneth O. Chilstrom, American Air Force officer (d. 2022)
- April 22 – Vivian Dandridge, African-American actress (d. 1991)
- April 23 – Janet Blair, American actress (d. 2007)
- April 25 – Karel Appel, Dutch painter (d. 2006)
- April 26
  - Nelson Dalzell, New Zealand rugby union player (d. 1989)
  - Jimmy Giuffre, American jazz musician (d. 2008)
- April 27
  - Abdelmalek Benhabyles, Algerian politician (d. 2018)
  - Hans-Joachim Kulenkampff, German television host, entertainer (d. 1998)
- April 29
  - Cornelis de Jager, Dutch astronomer (d. 2021)
  - Pavel Vranský, Czech brigadier general and RAF radio operator (d. 2018)
- April 30
  - Dottie Green, American professional baseball player (d. 1992)
  - Tove Maës, Danish actress (d. 2010)

=== May ===
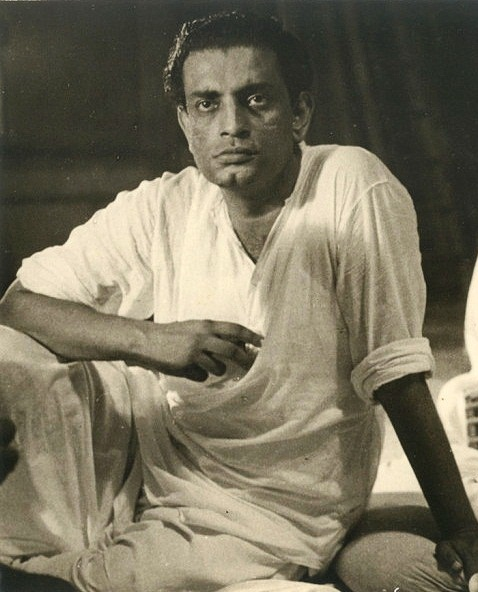
Satyajit Ray

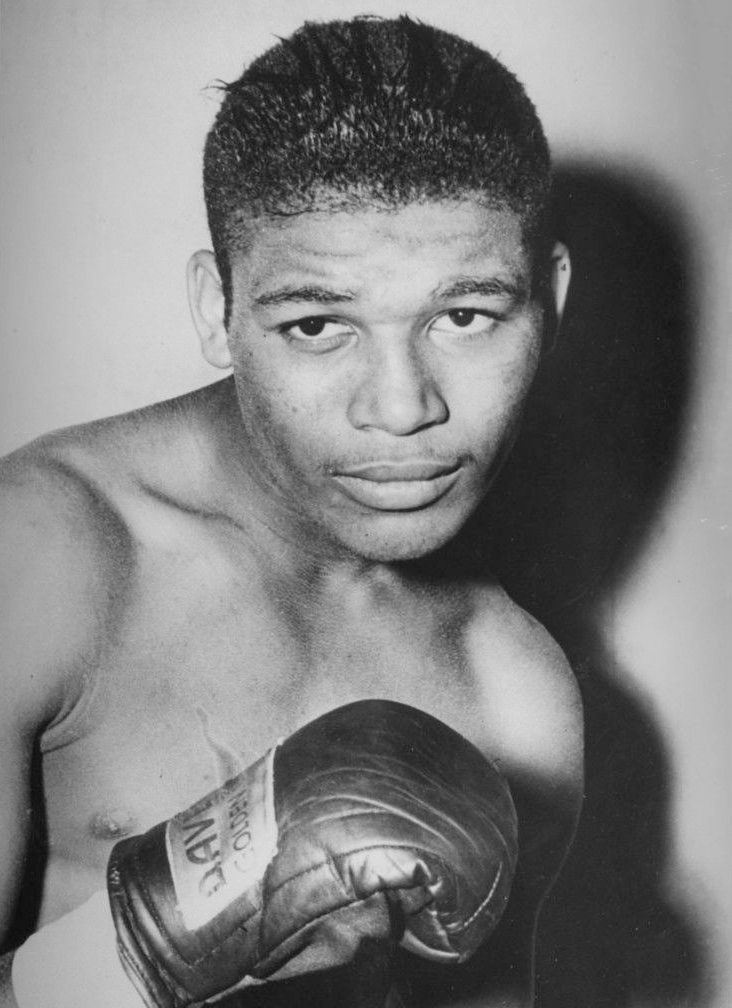
Sugar Ray Robinson

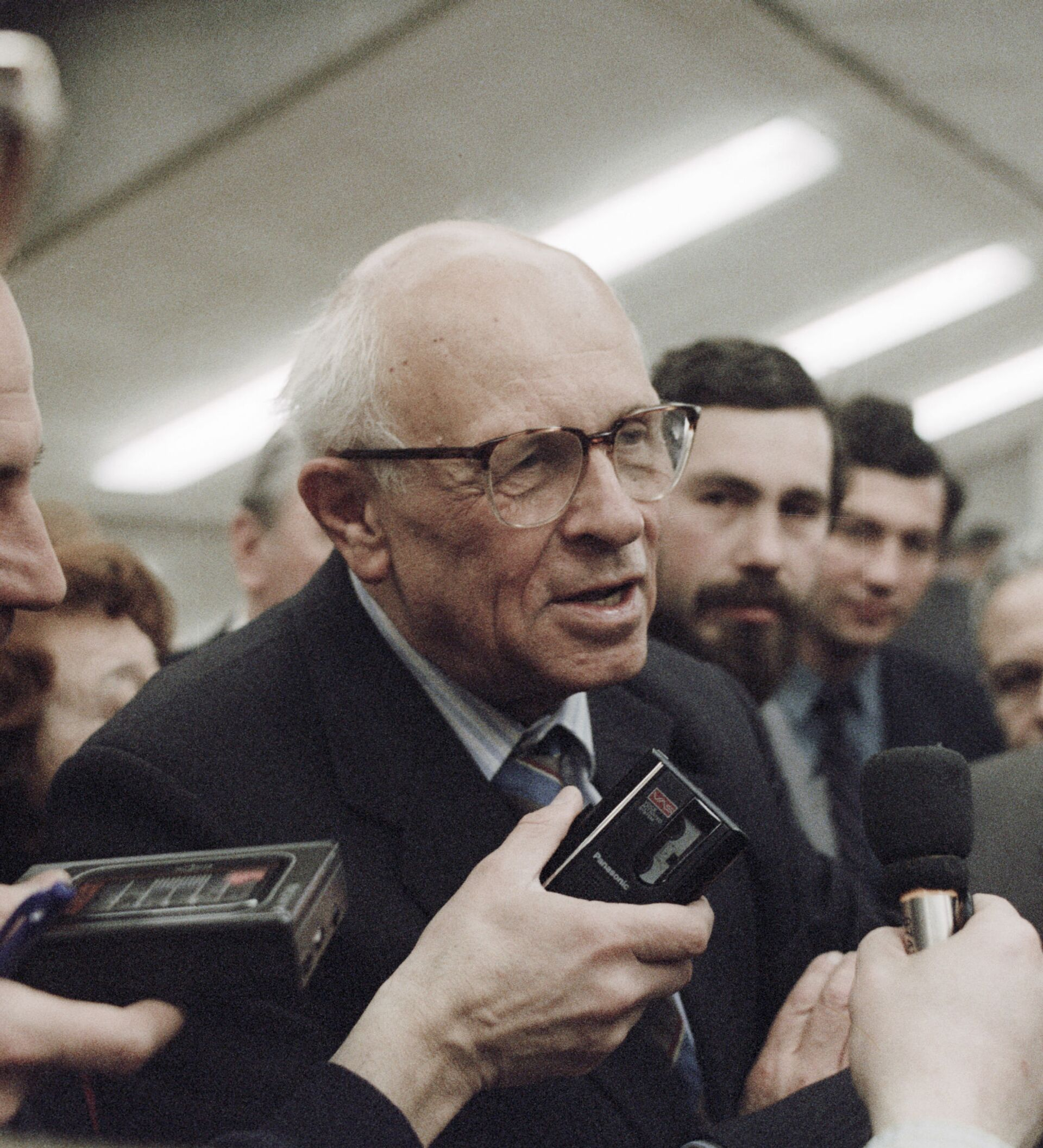
Andrei Sakharov

- May 2
  - B. B. Lal, Indian archaeologist (d. 2022)
  - Satyajit Ray, Indian filmmaker (d. 1992)
- May 3 – Sugar Ray Robinson, American boxer (d. 1989)
- May 4 – Harry Daghlian, American physicist (d. 1945)
- May 5
  - Jim Conacher, Canadian ice hockey player (d. 2020)
  - Arthur Leonard Schawlow, American physicist, Nobel Prize laureate (d. 1999)
  - Eric Tweedale, English-born Australian rugby union player (d. 2023)
- May 6 – Erich Fried, Austrian author (d. 1988)
- May 8 – Robert Hugh Ferrell, American historian (d. 2018)
- May 9 – Sophie Scholl, German student, anti-Nazi resistance fighter (executed) (d. 1943)
- May 11
  - Hildegard Hamm-Brücher, German politician (d. 2016)
  - Alec Mathieson, Australian rules footballer (d. 2022)
- May 12
  - Joseph Beuys, German artist (d. 1986)
  - Farley Mowat, Canadian writer, naturalist (d. 2014)
  - Lily Renée, Austrian-born American cartoonist (d. 2022)
- May 15 – Baron Vaea, Prime Minister of Tonga (d. 2009)
- May 16
  - Earl Ashby, Cuban baseball player
  - Harry Carey Jr., American actor (d. 2012)
- May 17 – Dennis Brain, English musician (d. 1957)
- May 18 – Michael A. Epstein, English pathologist and academic (d. 2024)
- May 19
  - Karel van het Reve, Dutch writer (d. 1999)
  - Yuri Kochiyama, Japanese-American civil rights activist (d. 2014)
- May 20 – Wolfgang Borchert, German writer (d. 1947)
- May 21
  - Andrei Sakharov, Soviet physicist, human rights activist, and recipient of the Nobel Peace Prize (d. 1989)
  - Prabhat Ranjan Sarkar, Indian philosopher, author of the socio-economic Progressive Utilization Theory (d. 1990)
- May 23
  - Beate Albrecht, German violinist and music educator (d. 2017)
  - James Blish, American science fiction author (d. 1975)
  - Laurin L. Henry, American researcher (d. 2025)
  - Ray Lawler, Australian actor and director (d. 2024)
  - Humphrey Lyttelton, British jazz musician, radio personality (d. 2008)
  - Georgy Natanson, Russian director, screenwriter and playwright (d. 2017)
- May 24 – Yevgeniya Rudneva, Soviet World War II heroine (d. 1944)
- May 25
  - Hal David, American songwriter and lyricist (d. 2012)
  - Kitty Kallen, American singer (d. 2016)
  - Sadhu Ram Sharma, Indian politician
  - Jack Steinberger, German-born physicist, Nobel Prize laureate (d. 2020)
- May 26
  - Inge Borkh, German soprano (some sources say she was born 1917) (d. 2018)
  - Stan Mortensen, English footballer (d. 1991)
- May 28 – Heinz G. Konsalik, German author (d. 1999)
- May 29
  - Norman Hetherington, Australian puppeteer and artist (d. 2010)
  - Elizabeth Kelly, English actress (d. 2025)
- May 30
  - Branko Mamula, Yugoslav politician (d. 2021)
  - Jamie Uys, South African actor, film director (d. 1996)

=== June ===
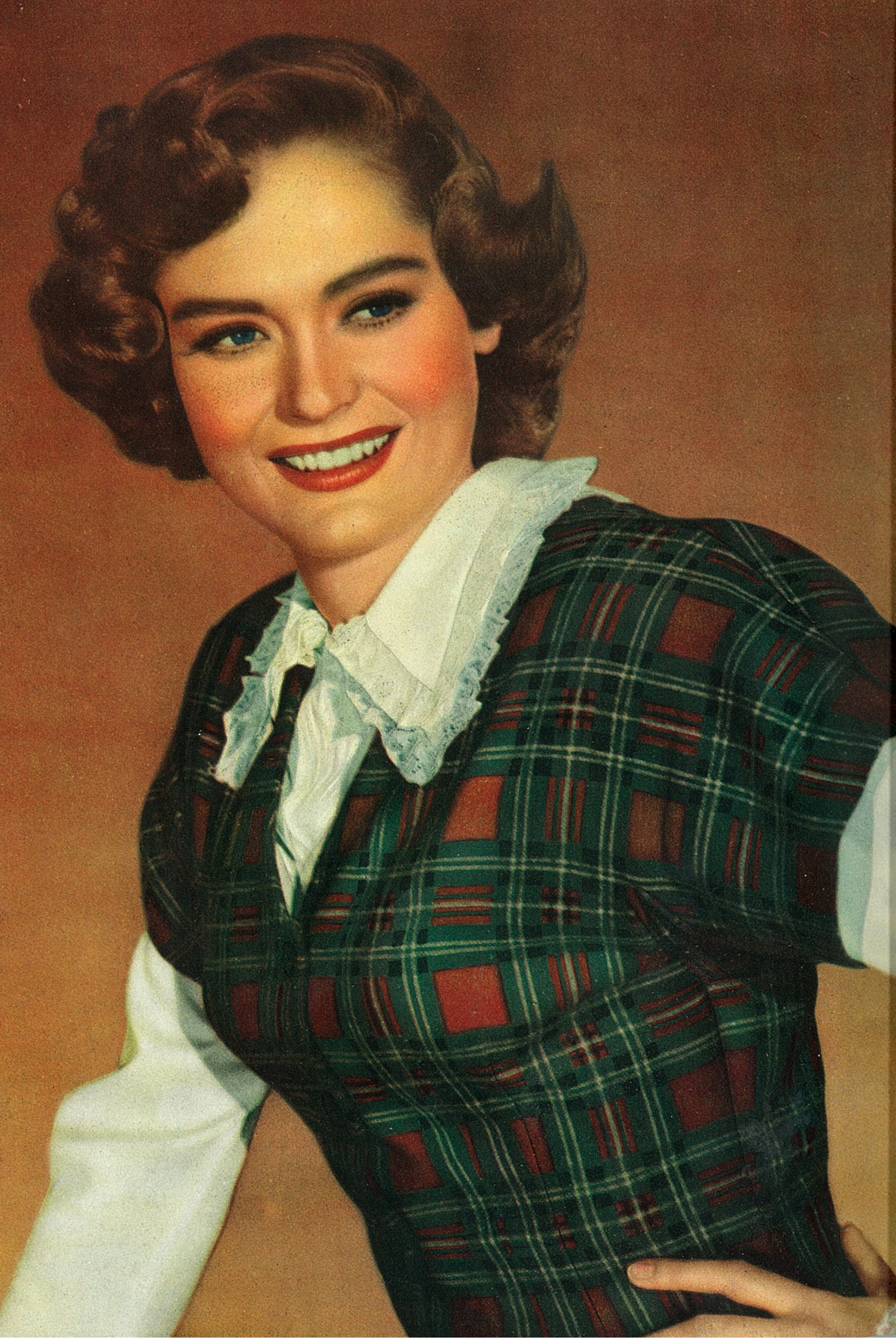
Alexis Smith

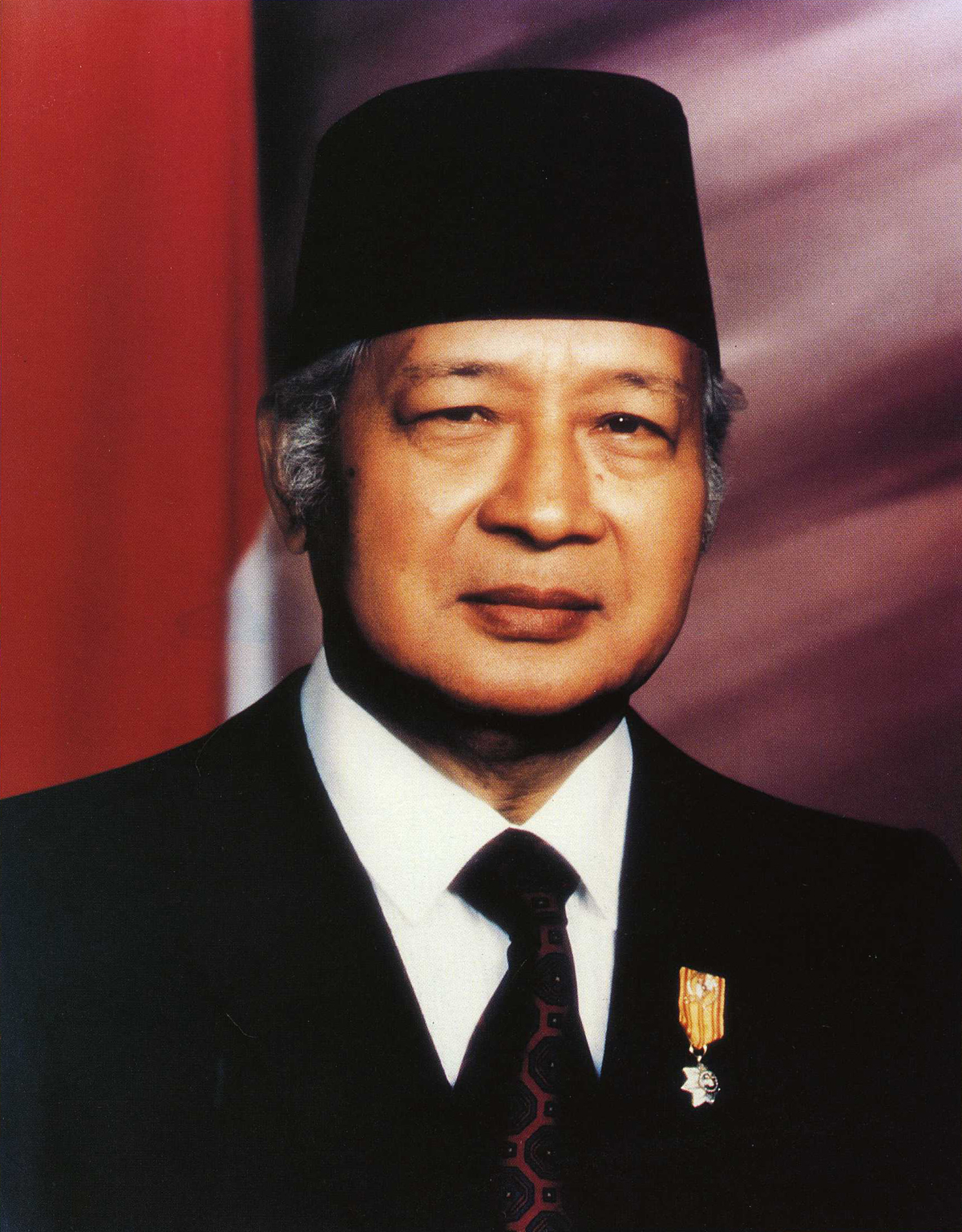
Suharto

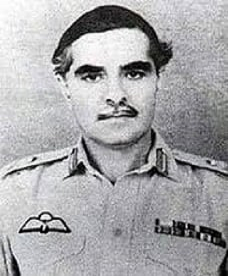
Gul Hassan Khan

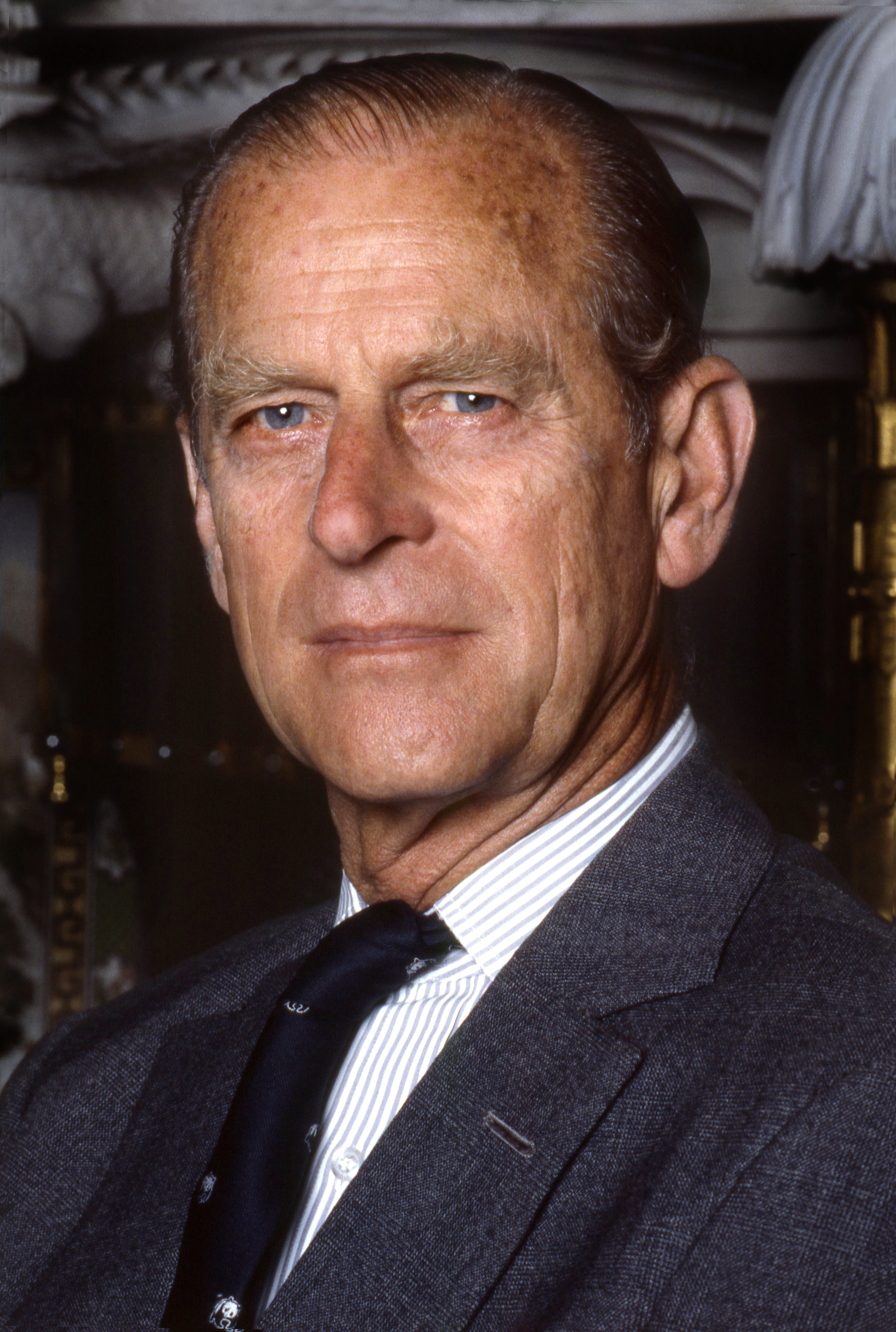
Prince Philip, Duke of Edinburgh

Jane Russell

- June 1 – Nelson Riddle, American bandleader (d. 1985)
- June 3 – Forbes Carlile, Australian athlete (d. 2016)
- June 4 – Bobby Wanzer, American basketball player and coach (d. 2016)
- June 5
  - James Francis Edwards, Canadian fighter pilot (d. 2022)
  - P. K. Warrier, Indian Ayurveda practitioner (d. 2021)
- June 7
  - Myrtle Edwards, Australian cricketer, softball player (d. 2010)
  - Bernard Lown, American medical innovator, Nobel Peace Prize recipient (d. 2021)
  - Jakob Skarstein, Norwegian journalist and radio personality (d. 2021)
  - Brian Talboys, New Zealand politician, 7th Deputy Prime Minister of New Zealand (d. 2012)
- June 8
  - Alexis Smith, Canadian-born American actress (d. 1993)
  - Suharto, President of Indonesia (d. 2008)
- June 9
  - Margaret Danhauser, American professional baseball player (d. 1987)
  - Gul Hassan Khan, Pakistani survivor of the 1935 Quetta earthquake, three-star rank General and last C-in-C of the Pakistan Army (d. 1999)
- June 10
  - Oskar Gröning, German SS officer, war criminal (d. 2018)
  - Jim Cullivan, American football coach (d. 2024)
  - Prince Philip, Duke of Edinburgh, Greek-born member of the British royal family as consort of Queen Elizabeth II (d. 2021)
  - Sergio Arellano Stark, Chilean military officer (d. 2016)
  - Yakov Springer, Polish weightlifting judge (d. 1972)
- June 12
  - Luis García Berlanga, Spanish film director and screenwriter (d. 2010)
  - Johan Witteveen, Dutch politician, economist and 5th Managing Director of the IMF (d. 2019)
- June 13
  - Edmund Gordon, American psychologist
  - Nancy Warren, American professional baseball player (d. 2001)
- June 16 – Walter Barylli, Austrian violinist (d. 2022)
- June 17 – Aydın Boysan, Turkish architect (d. 2018)
- June 19
  - Richard M. Goody, English-born American atmospheric physicist and professor (d. 2023)
  - Doris Sands Johnson, Bahamian teacher, suffragette and politician (d. 1983)
  - Louis Jourdan, French actor (d. 2015)
- June 21
  - Gebhard Büchel, Liechtenstein decathlete
  - Hernando Hoyos, Colombian sports shooter (d. 2000)
  - Patricia Kenworthy Nuckols, American field hockey player and aviator (d. 2022)
  - Thomas Morrow Reavley, American judge (d. 2020)
  - Jane Russell, American actress (d. 2011)
- June 22
  - Ralph K. Hofer, American fighter pilot (d. 1942)
  - Růžena Krásná, Czech politician and human rights advocate (d. 2012)
  - Barbara Perry, American actress and singer (d. 2019)
- June 23
  - Paul Findley, American politician (d. 2019)
  - Marius Mora, French cross-country skier (d. 2006)
  - Colin Pinch, Australian cricketer (d. 2006)
- June 24 – Gerhard Sommer, German soldier (d. 2019)
- June 25 – Dennis Wilson, British war poet (d. 2022)
- June 26
  - Robert Everett, American computer scientist (d. 2018)
  - Violette Szabo, French World War II heroine (d. 1945)
- June 27
  - Muriel Pavlow, English actress (d. 2019)
  - Princess Vimolchatra of Thailand (d. 2009)
- June 28 – P. V. Narasimha Rao, Prime Minister of India (d. 2004)
- June 29
  - Bob Kennedy, American football player (d. 2010)
  - Jean Kent, English actress (d. 2013)
  - Reinhard Mohn, German businessman (d. 2009)
- June 30
  - Oswaldo López Arellano, 42nd and 44th President of Honduras (d. 2010)
  - Jules Amez-Droz, Swiss fencer (d. 2012)
  - Pierre Labric, French organist and composer

=== July ===
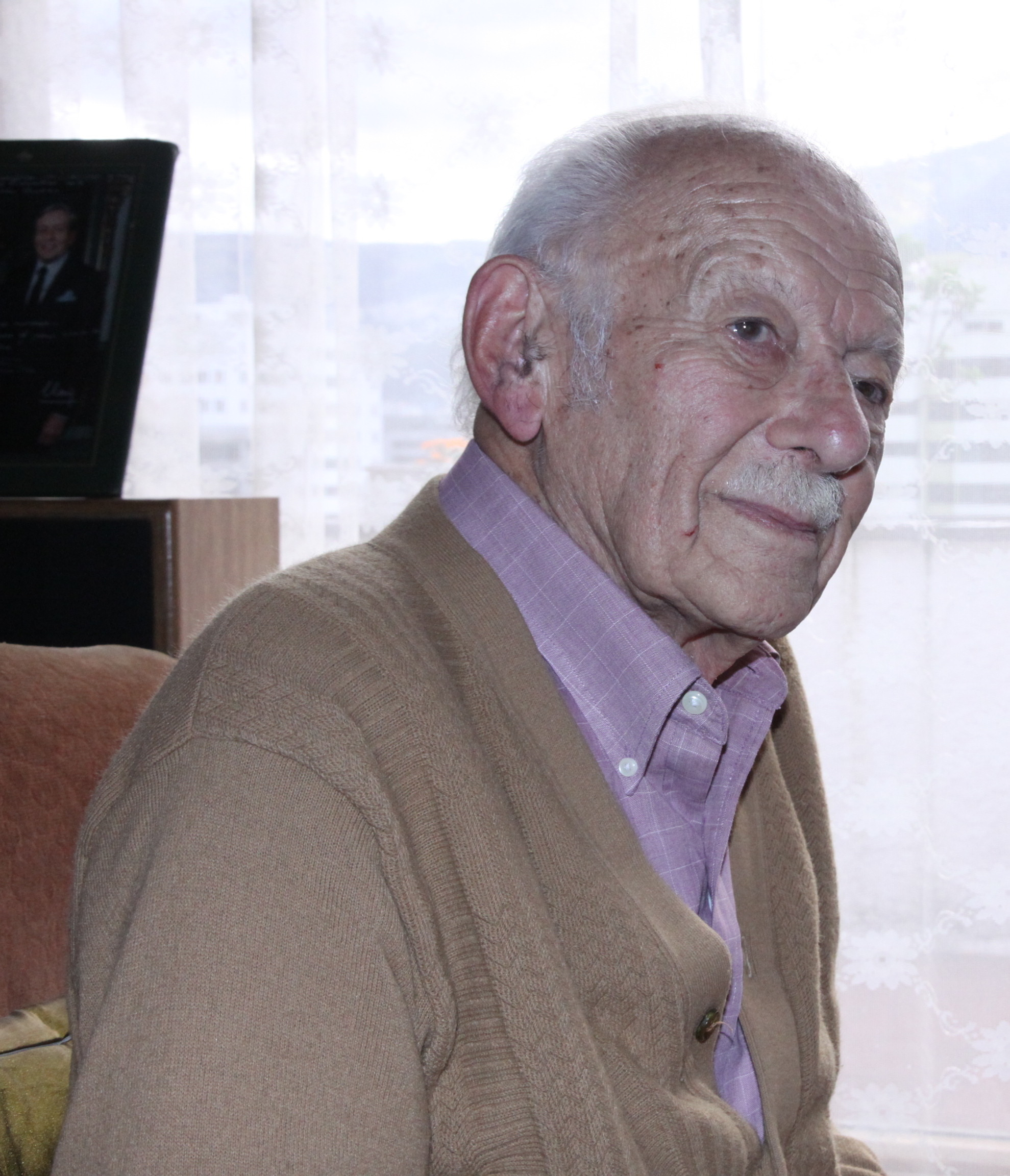
Sixto Durán Ballén

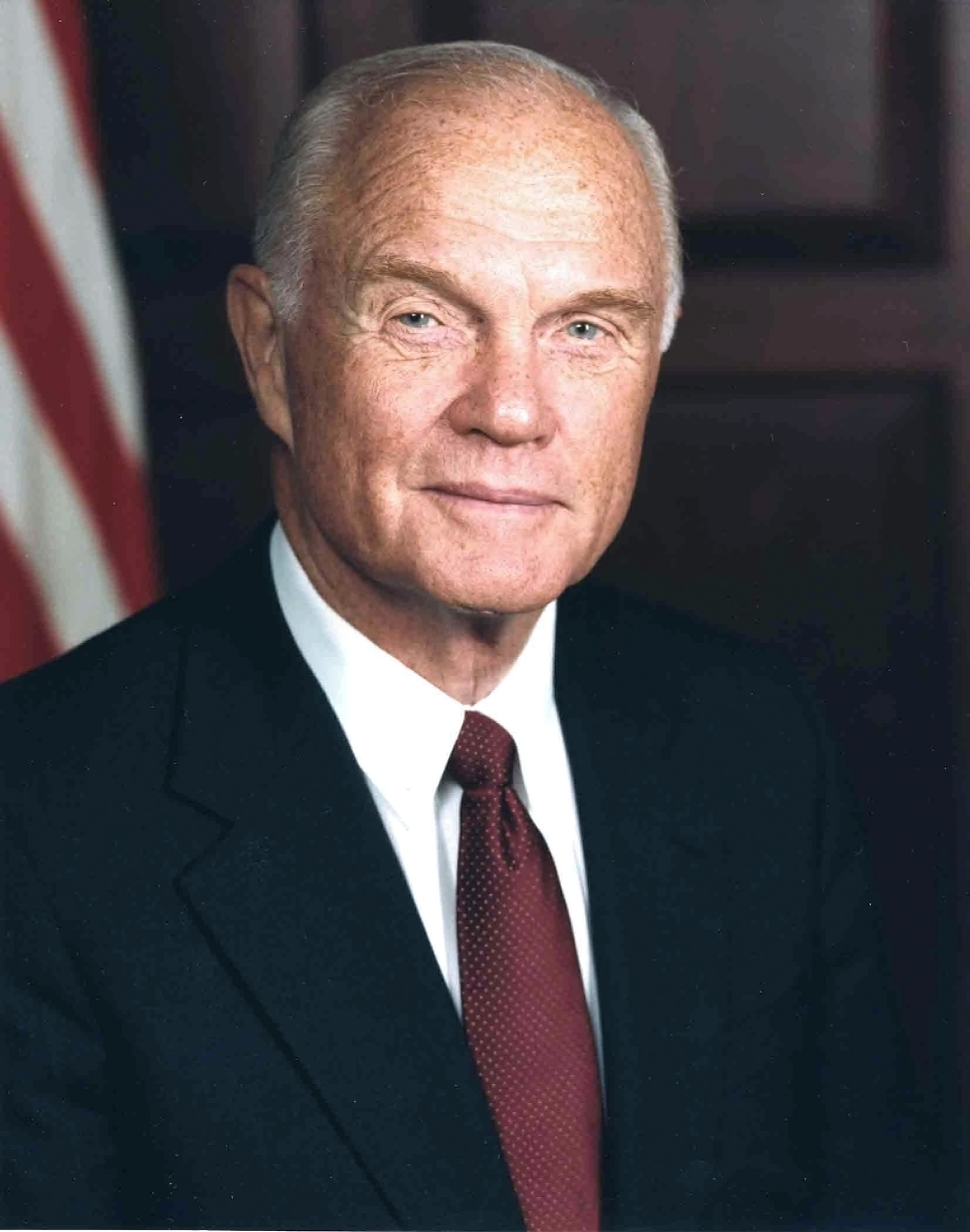
John Glenn

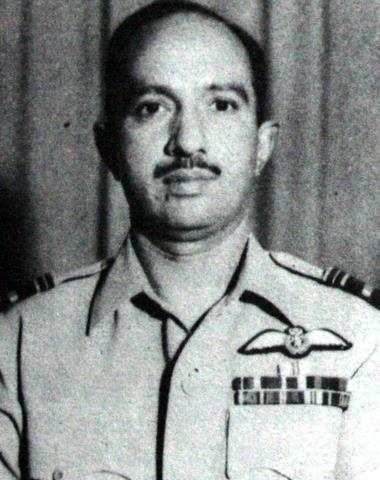
Mohammad Akhtar

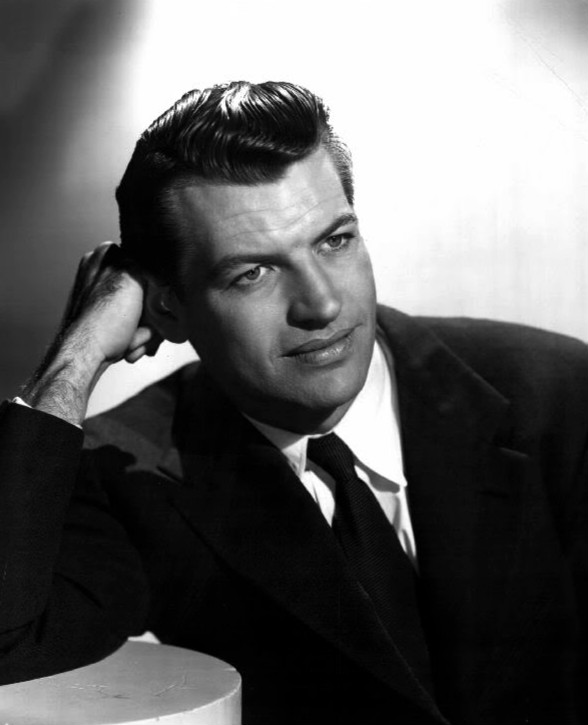
Richard Egan

- July 1 – Seretse Khama, 1st President of Botswana (d. 1980)
- July 2 – Joseph Zhu Baoyu, Chinese Roman Catholic bishop (d. 2020)
- July 3
  - Flor María Chalbaud, former First Lady of Venezuela (d. 2013)
  - Levi Yitzchak Horowitz, American-born Hasidic rebbe (d. 2009)
- July 4
  - Gérard Debreu, French economist, Nobel Prize laureate (d. 2004)
  - Dudar Hahanov, Soviet composer, violinist and conductor (d. 1995)
  - Nasser Sharifi, Iranian sports shooter
  - Tibor Varga, Hungarian violinist, conductor (d. 2003)
- July 5
  - Clare Abbott, South African artist and illustrator (d. 2008)
  - Zeynep Korkmaz, Turkish scholar and dialectologist (d. 2025)
  - Nanos Valaoritis, Greek writer (d. 2019)
  - Patricia Wright, American actress
- July 6
  - Nancy Reagan, American actress, First Lady of the United States (d. 2016)
  - Allan MacEachen, Canadian politician (d. 2017)
- July 7 – Dragomir Felba, Serbian actor (d. 2006)
- July 8
  - John Money, New Zealand psychologist, sexologist and author (d. 2006)
  - Edgar Morin, French philosopher and sociologist (d. 2026)
  - Frank Prihoda, Australian alpine skier (d. 2022)
- July 10
  - Ed Iskenderian, American hot rodder and businessman (d. 2026)
  - Eunice Kennedy Shriver, daughter of American politician Joseph P. Kennedy (d. 2009)
  - John K. Singlaub, U.S. Army Major General (d. 2022)
- July 11
  - Claude Bonin-Pissarro, French painter and graphic designer (d. 2021)
  - Petter Hugsted, Norwegian Olympic ski jumper (d. 2000)
  - Ilse Werner, German actress (d. 2005)
- July 13
  - Lucette Finas, French author and essayist
  - Ernest Gold, Austrian-American composer (d. 1999)
  - Reinhard Sommer, German trade union leader
- July 14
  - Leon Garfield, English writer (d. 1996)
  - Armand Gaudreault, Canadian ice hockey player (d. 2013)
  - Geoffrey Wilkinson, English chemist, Nobel Prize laureate (d. 1996)
  - Sixto Durán Ballén, President of Ecuador (d. 2016)
- July 15
  - Robert Bruce Merrifield, American chemist, Nobel Prize laureate (d. 2006)
  - Carl Richardson, American football coach (d. 2023)
  - N. Sankaraiah, Indian communist politician (d. 2023)
- July 17
  - Acquanetta, American actress (d. 2004)
  - Pío Corcuera, Argentine football striker (d. 2011)
  - Hannah Szenes, Hungarian World War II heroine (d. 1944)
- July 18
  - Aaron T. Beck, American psychiatrist (d. 2021)
  - Heinz Bennent, German actor (d. 2011)
  - John Glenn, American astronaut, U.S. senator (d. 2016)
  - Richard Leacock, British-born documentary filmmaker, pioneer of Cinéma Vérité (d. 2011)
  - Hans Conrad Leipelt, Austrian member of the White Rose resistance movement in Nazi Germany (d. 1945)
  - Gerry Mays, Scottish football player, manager (d. 2006)
- July 19
  - Bertil Antonsson, Swedish heavyweight wrestler (d. 2006)
  - Rosalyn Sussman Yalow, American physicist, recipient of the Nobel Prize in Physiology or Medicine (d. 2011)
- July 21 – Mohammad Akhtar, Pakistani Air Vice Marshal and Deputy Chief of Air Staff (d. 1983)
- July 24 – Murad Ahmad, Malaysian politician
- July 26
  - Valmiki Choudhary, Indian politician (d. 1996)
  - Wang Xiji, Chinese aerospace engineer (d. 2026)
- July 28
  - Melba Hernández, Cuban politician, diplomat (d. 2014)
  - Ella Tengbom-Velander, Swedish politician (d. 2022)
- July 29
  - Richard Egan, American actor (d. 1987)
  - Gustav Victor Rudolf Born, German-British pharmacologist (d. 2018)
- July 30 – Grant Johannesen, American concert pianist (d. 2005)
- July 31
  - Whitney Young, American civil rights leader (d. 1971)
  - Mel Hirsch, American basketball player (d. 1968)
  - Julieta Pinto, Costa Rican educator and writer (d. 2022)

=== August ===
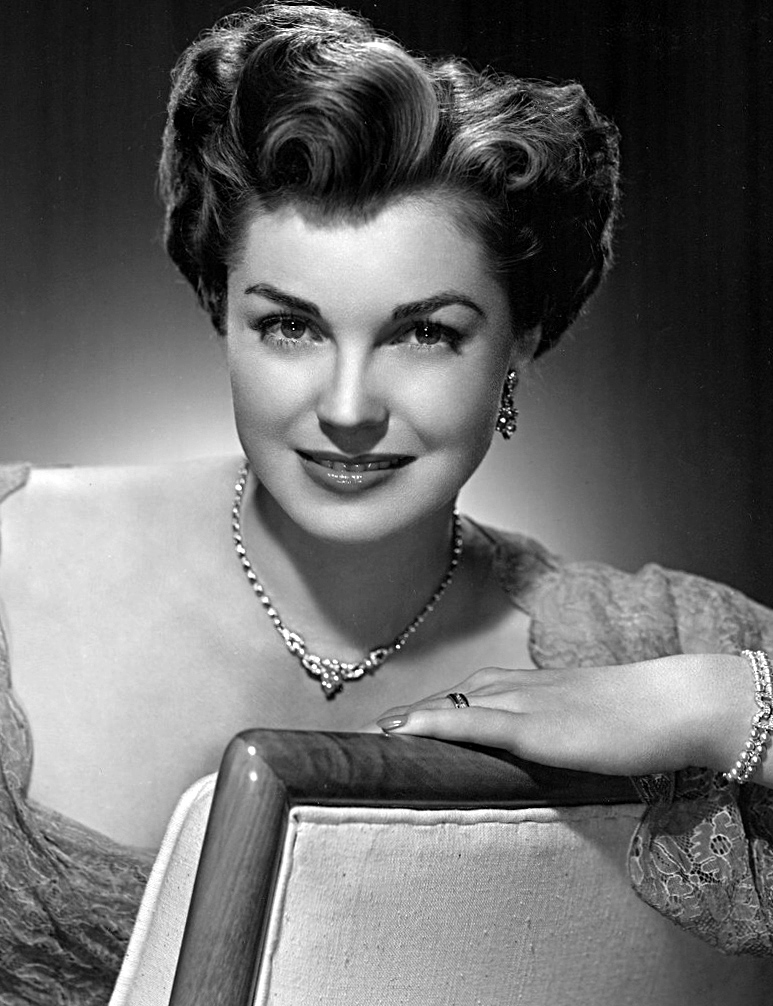
Esther Williams

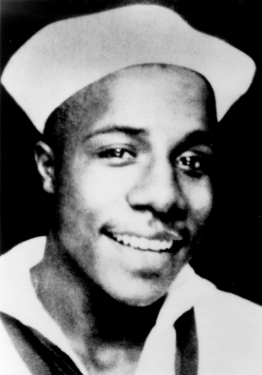
Alex Haley

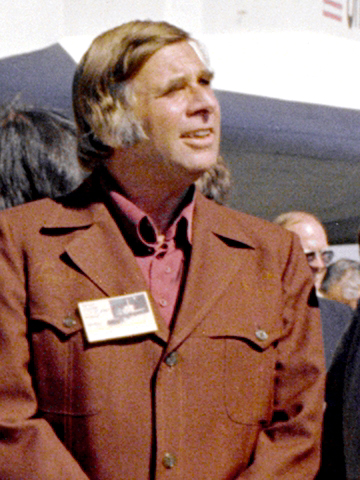
Gene Roddenberry

- August 1
  - George Büchi, American chemist (d. 1998)
  - Jack Kramer, American tennis player and commentator (d. 2009)
- August 2
  - Mable Lee, American tap dancer, singer, and entertainer (d. 2019)
  - George Wilson, American comic book artist (d. 1998)
- August 3 – Richard Adler, American Broadway composer (d. 2012)
- August 4
  - Charles H. Coolidge, American Medal of Honour recipient (d. 2021)
  - Maurice Richard, Canadian hockey player (d. 2000)
- August 5 – Anita Foss, American baseball player (d. 2015)
- August 8 – Esther Williams, American swimmer, actress (d. 2013)
- August 9
  - Ernest Angley, American evangelist, author and station owner (d. 2021)
  - Patricia Marmont, American-English actress (d. 2020)
- August 10
  - Ion Negoițescu, Romanian literary historian, critic, poet, novelist and memoirist (d. 1993)
  - Jack B. Weinstein, American federal judge (d. 2021)
- August 11 – Alex Haley, American author (d. 1992)
- August 13 – Mary Lee, Scottish singer (d. 2022)
- August 15
  - Tom M. Rice, American soldier and paratrooper that fought in WWII (d. 2022)
  - K. Kailasanatha Kurukkal, Sri Lankan researcher, writer and professor (d. 2000)
- August 17
  - Betty Cody, Canadian-born country music singer (d. 2014)
  - Geoffrey Elton, born Gottfried Ehrenberg, German-born British political and constitutional historian (d. 1994)
- August 19 – Gene Roddenberry, American television producer (Star Trek) (d. 1991)
- August 21
  - John Osteen, American televangelist (d. 1999)
  - Victor Szebehely, Hungarian-American astronomer (d. 1997)
- August 22 – Lee Loy Seng, Malaysian businessman (d. 1993)
- August 23 – Kenneth Arrow, American economist, Nobel Prize laureate (d. 2017)
- August 24 – Gerald Tanner, Australian rules footballer (d. 2022)
- August 26
  - Shimshon Amitsur, Israeli mathematician, Israel Prize recipient (d. 1994)
  - Benjamin Bradlee, American journalist, executive editor of The Washington Post (d. 2014)
- August 27
  - Leo Penn, American actor and director (d. 1998)
  - Georg Alexander, Duke of Mecklenburg, head of the House of Mecklenburg-Strelitz (d. 1996)
  - Abang Muhammad Salahuddin, 3rd and 6th Yang di-Pertua Negeri of Sarawak (d. 2022)
  - Babbis Friis-Baastad, Norwegian children's writer (d. 1970)
- August 28
  - Nancy Kulp, American actress (d. 1991)
  - Lidia Gueiler Tejada, 56th President of Bolivia (d. 2011)
- August 29
  - Iris Apfel, American interior designer (d. 2024)
  - Arlo Hullinger, American politician (d. 2021)
  - Wendell Scott, American race car driver (d. 1990)
  - Paddy Roy Bates, British pirate radio broadcaster, founder of the Principality of Sealand (d. 2012)
- August 30 – David Finn, American public relations executive and photographer (d. 2021)
- August 31 – Raymond Williams, Welsh academic, novelist and critic (d. 1988)

=== September ===
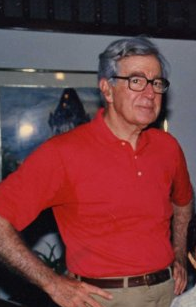
Virgilio Barco Vargas

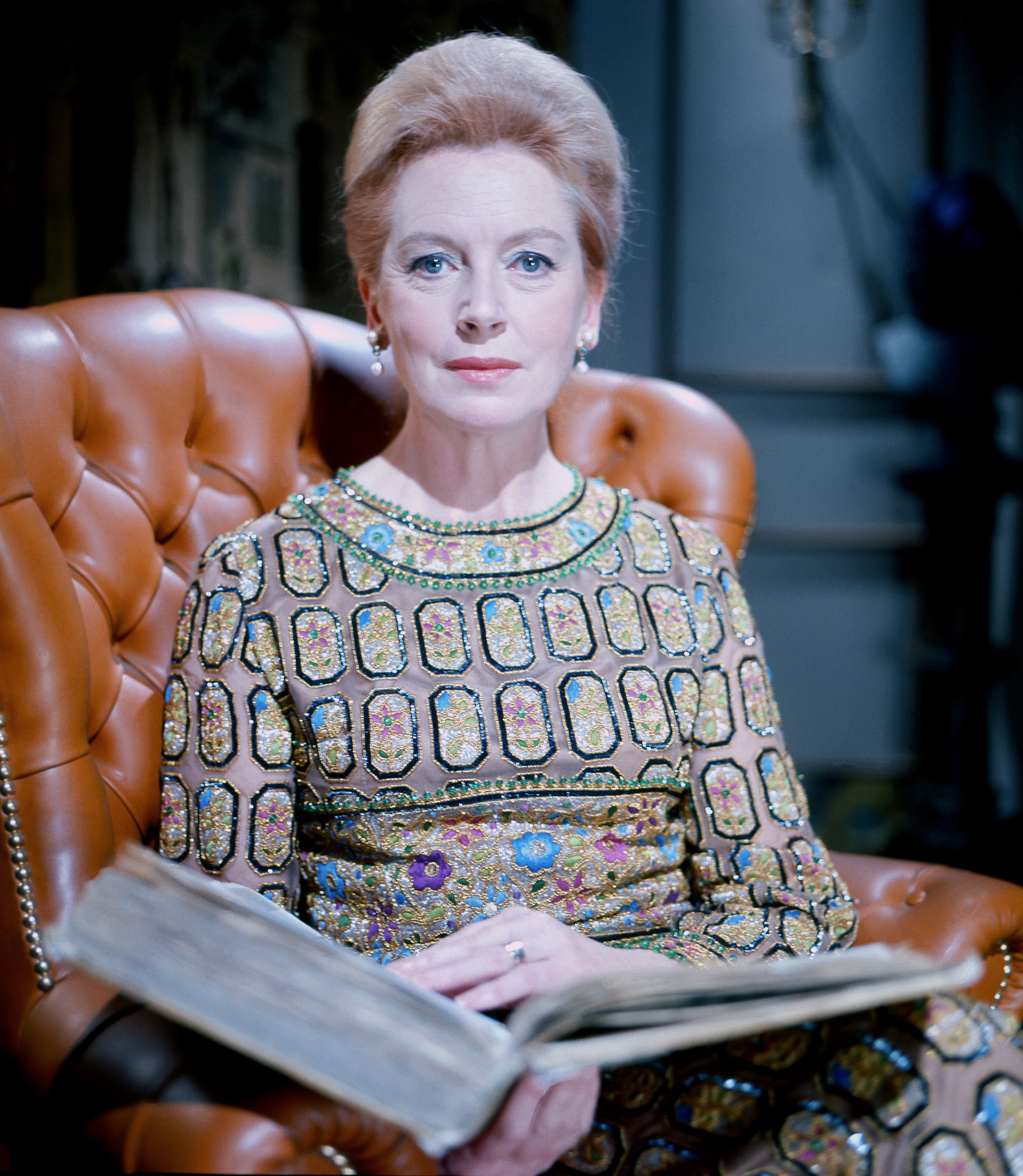
Deborah Kerr

- September 2 – Julio Adalberto Rivera Carballo, 34th President of El Salvador (d. 1973)
- September 3
  - Bill Dean, English actor (d. 2000)
  - Oonah Shannahan, New Zealand netball player (d. 2022)
- September 4 – Paul A. Libby, American professor (d. 2021)
- September 5
  - Queen Consort Farida of Egypt (d. 1988)
  - Eddy Goldfarb, American toy inventor
- September 6 – Andrée Geulen-Herscovici, member of the Comité de Défense des Juifs (d. 2022)
- September 7
  - Riccardo Cerutti, Italian rower (d. 1999)
  - Antonio Gelabert, Spanish road bicycle racer (d. 1956)
  - Arthur Ferrante, American pianist (Ferrante & Teicher) (d. 2009)
  - Linus Nirmal Gomes, Indian Roman Catholic bishop (d. 2021)
  - Kenneth M. Watson, American theoretical physicist and physical oceanographer (d. 2023)
- September 8
  - Harry Secombe, Welsh entertainer (d. 2001)
  - Dinko Šakić, Croatian concentration camp commander (d. 2008)
- September 10 – Hideo Haga, Japanese photographer (d. 2022)
- September 11 – George Joseph, American insurer
- September 12
  - Stanisław Lem, Polish science fiction writer (d. 2006)
  - Bachir Yellès, Algerian painter (d. 2022)
- September 13
  - Gunnar Eriksson, Swedish Olympic cross-country skier (d. 1982)
  - Cyrille Adoula, Congolese trade unionist and politician, 4th Prime Minister of Zaire (d. 1978)
  - Sergey Nepobedimy, Soviet rocket weaponry designer (d. 2014)
- September 14
  - A. Jean de Grandpré, Canadian lawyer and businessman (d. 2022)
  - Zizinho, Brazilian football player (d. 2002)
- September 15 – Joseph Iléo, Prime Minister of the Democratic Republic of the Congo (d. 1994)
- September 16 – Earle Parsons, American football player (d. 2014)
- September 17 – Virgilio Barco Vargas, 27th President of Colombia (d. 1997)
- September 18
  - Nermin Abadan Unat, Turkish lawyer, politician and academic (d. 2025)
  - Kamal Hassan Aly, Egyptian politician, 43rd Prime Minister of Egypt (d. 1993)
  - Johannes W. Rohen, German anatomist (d. 2022)
- September 19 – Paulo Freire, Brazilian educator and philosopher (d. 1997)
- September 20 – Leon Comber, English author and military officer (d. 2023)
- September 21 – Gaylen C. Hansen, American artist
- September 22 – Betty Reid Soskin, American park ranger (d. 2025)
- September 24
  - André Lacroix, French pentathlete (d. 2016)
  - Jim McKay, American sportscaster (d. 2008)
  - Charlene Pryer, American professional baseball player (d. 1999)
- September 25
  - Robert Muldoon, 31st Prime Minister of New Zealand (d. 1992)
  - Alf Patrick, English footballer (d. 2021)
  - Robert C. Prim, American mathematician and computer scientist (d. 2021)
- September 27
  - Miklós Jancsó, Hungarian film director (d. 2014)
  - John Malcolm Patterson, American politician (d. 2021)
- September 28 – Lim Tze Peng, Singaporean artist (d. 2025)
- September 29 – Grigory Svirsky, Russian-Canadian writer (d. 2016)
- September 30
  - Sagramor de Scuvero Brandão (d. 1995) Brazilian actress and radio personality
  - Deborah Kerr, Scottish actress (d. 2007)
  - Jorge Loring Miró, Spanish Jesuit priest, public speaker and author (d. 2013)

=== October ===
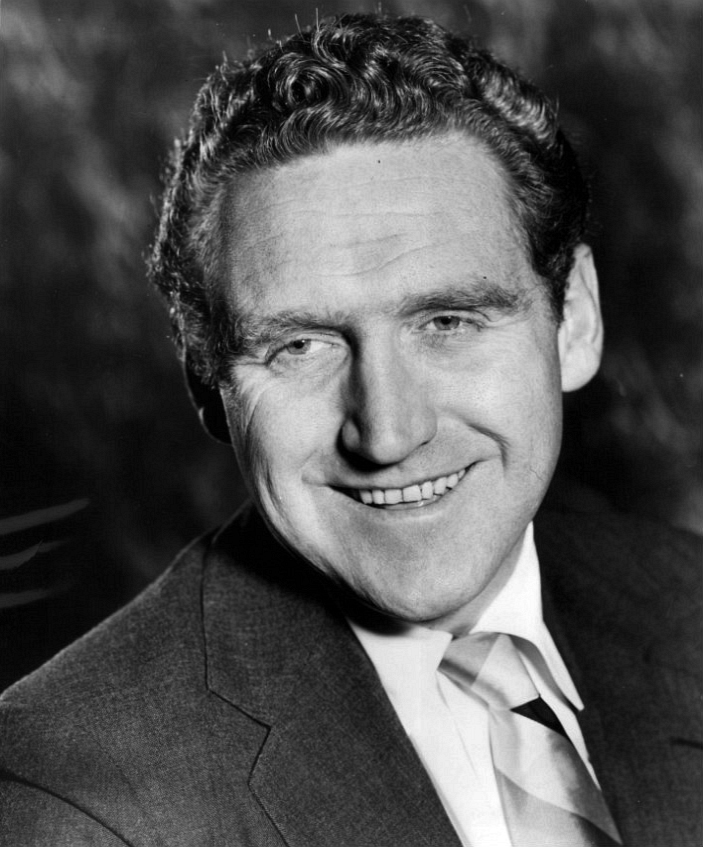
James Whitmore

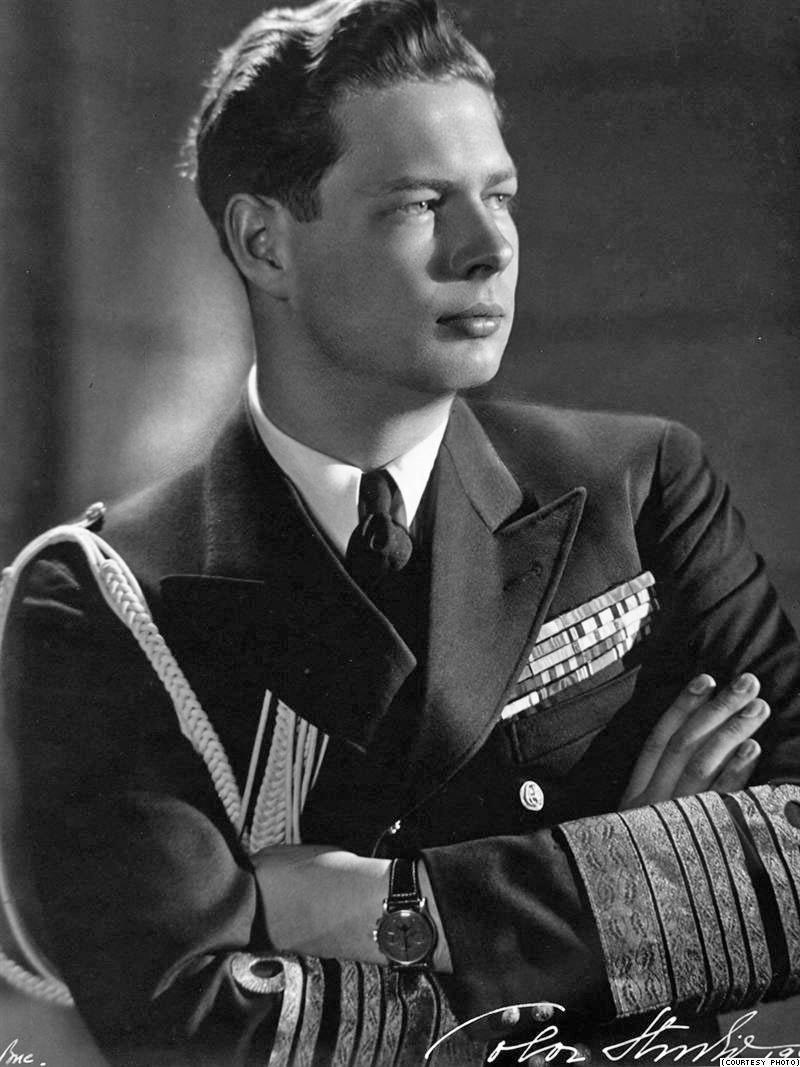
Michael I

- October 1 – James Whitmore, American actor (d. 2009)
- October 2 – Robert Runcie, Archbishop of Canterbury (d. 2000)
- October 3 – Ray Lindwall, Australian cricketer (d. 1996)
- October 4 –Francisco Morales-Bermúdez, President of Peru (d. 2022)
- October 6
  - Joseph Lowery, American minister and civil rights activist (d. 2020)
  - Joop Sanders, Dutch-born American painter and educator (d. 2023)
- October 7
  - Beth Bentley, American poet (d. 2021)
  - Richard L. Duchossois, American businessman (d. 2022)
- October 8 – Abraham Sarmiento, Filipino Supreme Court jurist (d. 2010)
- October 9 – Dot Wilkinson, American softball player (d. 2023)
- October 10 – James Clavell, British novelist (d. 1994)
- October 11
  - Manuel Costa, Spanish road racing cyclist
  - Shaw McCutcheon, American cartoonist (d. 2016)
- October 13 – Yves Montand, French singer and actor (d. 1991)
- October 14
  - José Arraño Acevedo, Chilean historian (d. 2009)
  - Jeffrey G. Smith, American general (d. 2021)
- October 16 – Sita Ram Goel, Indian historian, publisher and author (d. 2003)
- October 17
  - Edel Hætta Eriksen, Norwegian schoolteacher and politician (d. 2023)
  - Maria Gorokhovskaya, Soviet gymnast (d. 2001)
- October 19 – Gunnar Nordahl, Swedish footballer (d. 1995)
- October 21
  - Malcolm Arnold, British music composer (d. 2006)
  - Mohammad Mohammadullah, 3rd President of Bangladesh (d. 1999)
  - Zorawar Chand Bakhshi, Indian Army General (d. 2018)
  - Ingrid van Houten-Groeneveld, Dutch astronomer (d. 2015)
  - Wu Zhong, Chinese general (d. 1990)
- October 22 – Georges Brassens, French singer-songwriter (d. 1981)
- October 23
  - Denise Duval, French operatic soprano (d. 2016)
  - Archie Lamb, English ambassador and writer (d. 2021)
  - André Turcat, French aviator, first pilot of Concorde (d. 2016)
  - İlhan Usmanbaş, Turkish composer (d. 2025)
- October 24 – Sena Jurinac, Bosnian operatic soprano (d. 2011)
- October 25 – King Michael I of Romania (d. 2017)
- October 26 – Ted Bassett, American executive (d. 2025)
- October 27 – Eugene Chelyshev, Russian indologist and academician (d. 2020)
- October 29 – Santiago Fierro Fierro, Mexican politician and medical doctor (d. 2009)
- Unknown – Cao Keqiang, Chinese diplomat (d. 1999)

=== November ===
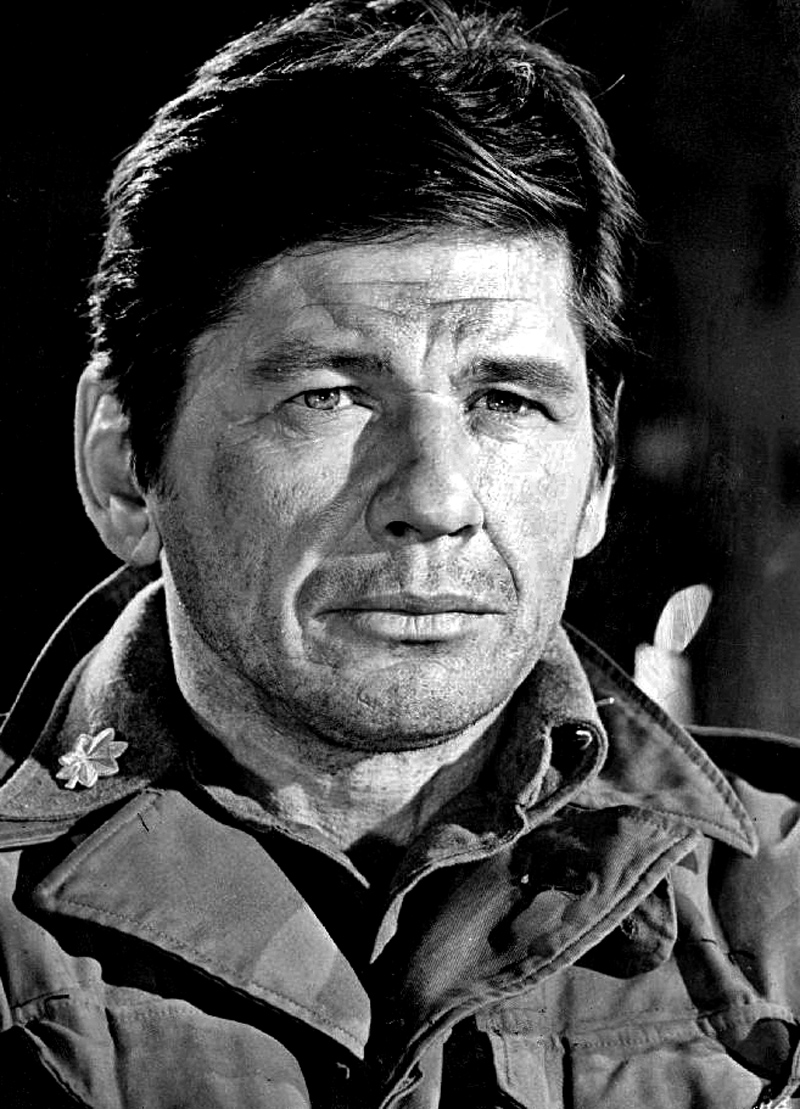
Charles Bronson

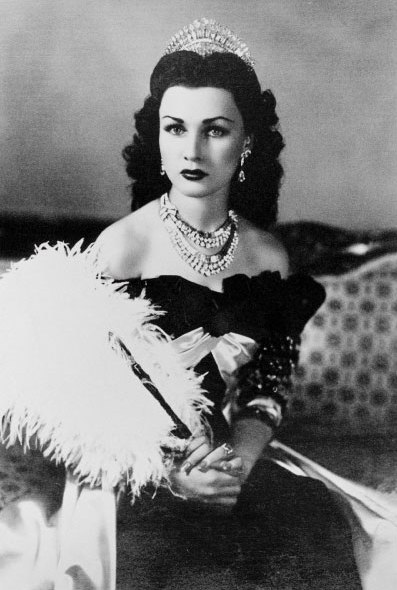
Princess Fawzia

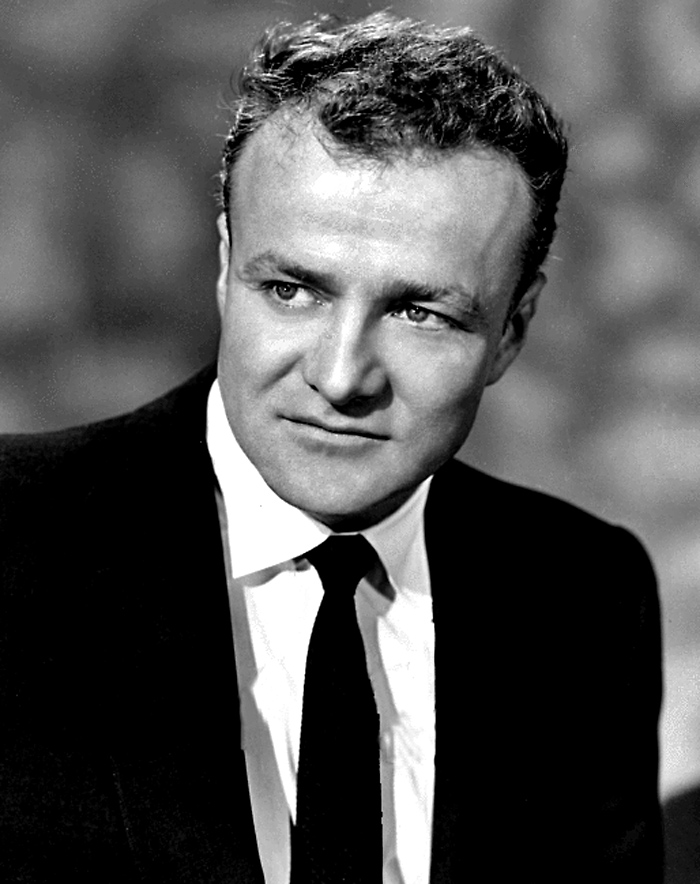
Brian Keith

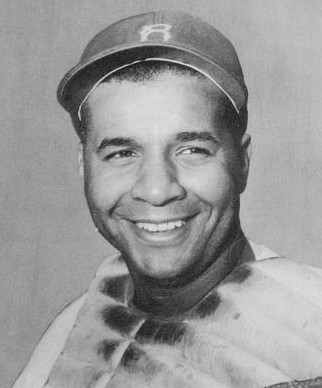
Roy Campanella

Rodney Dangerfield

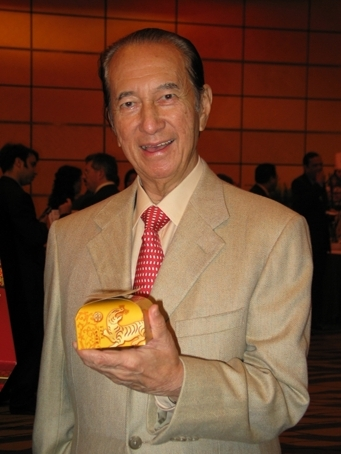
Stanley Ho

- November 1 – Pavel Țugui, Romanian communist activist and literary historian (d. 2021)
- November 2 – Wanda Półtawska, Polish physician and author (d. 2023)
- November 3
  - Charles Bronson, American actor (d. 2003)
  - Shin Kyuk-ho, South Korean businessman and founder of Lotte Corporation (d. 2020)
- November 5
  - Princess Fawzia Fuad of Egypt (d. 2013)
  - John F. Gonge, American lieutenant general
  - Margot Friedländer, Holocaust survivor (d. 2025)
- November 6
  - James Jones, American writer (d. 1977)
  - Tomiyama Taeko, Japanese visual artist (d. 2021)
  - Enrico Cocozza, Scottish filmmaker (d. 2009)
- November 7 – János Horváth, Hungarian politician (d. 2019)
- November 8
  - Walter Mirisch, American film producer (d. 2023)
  - Gene Saks, American actor, film director (d. 2015)
  - Peter Spoden, German night fighter ace (d. 2021)
- November 13 – Joonas Kokkonen, Finnish composer (d. 1996)
- November 14 – Brian Keith, American actor (d. 1997)
- November 15
  - Jimmy Fitzmorris, American politician (d. 2021)
  - Alexander Jefferson, American Air Force officer (d. 2022)
- November 17 – Ofelia Guilmáin, Mexican actress (d. 2005)
- November 18
  - Frances Hawkins, American politician and teacher, member of the Nevada State Assembly (d. 2001)
  - George Nagobads, American physician (d. 2023)
- November 19
  - Michel Bonnevie, French Olympic basketball player (d. 2018)
  - Roy Campanella, American baseball player (Brooklyn Dodgers), member of the MLB Hall of Fame (d. 1993)
- November 20 – Allen Dines, American politician (d. 2020)
- November 21 – Billie Mae Richards, Canadian actress, singer (d. 2010)
- November 22 – Rodney Dangerfield, American actor and comedian (d. 2004)
- November 23
  - Fred Buscaglione, Italian singer and actor (d. 1960)
  - Lois North, American politician (d. 2025)
- November 24 – John Lindsay, American lawyer and politician, Mayor of New York City (d. 2000)
- November 25
  - Stanley Ho, Hong Kong-Macanese businessman and philanthropist (d. 2020)
  - Johnny Johnson, English RAF officer (d. 2022)
- November 26
  - Tom Felleghy, Hungarian-born Italian actor (d. 2005)
  - Françoise Gilot, French painter, critic and author (d. 2023)
- November 27
  - Alexander Dubček, Slovak politician, First Secretary of the Central Committee of the Communist Party of Czechoslovakia (d. 1992)
  - James Kinnier Wilson, English assyriologist (d. 2022)

=== December ===
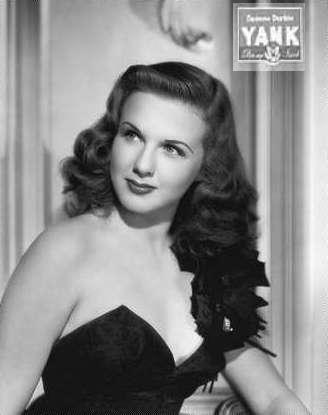
Deanna Durbin

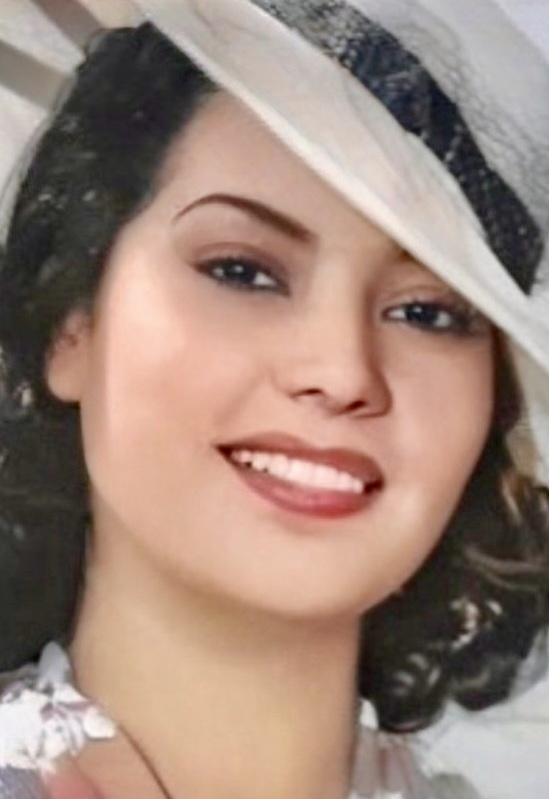
Madiha Yousri

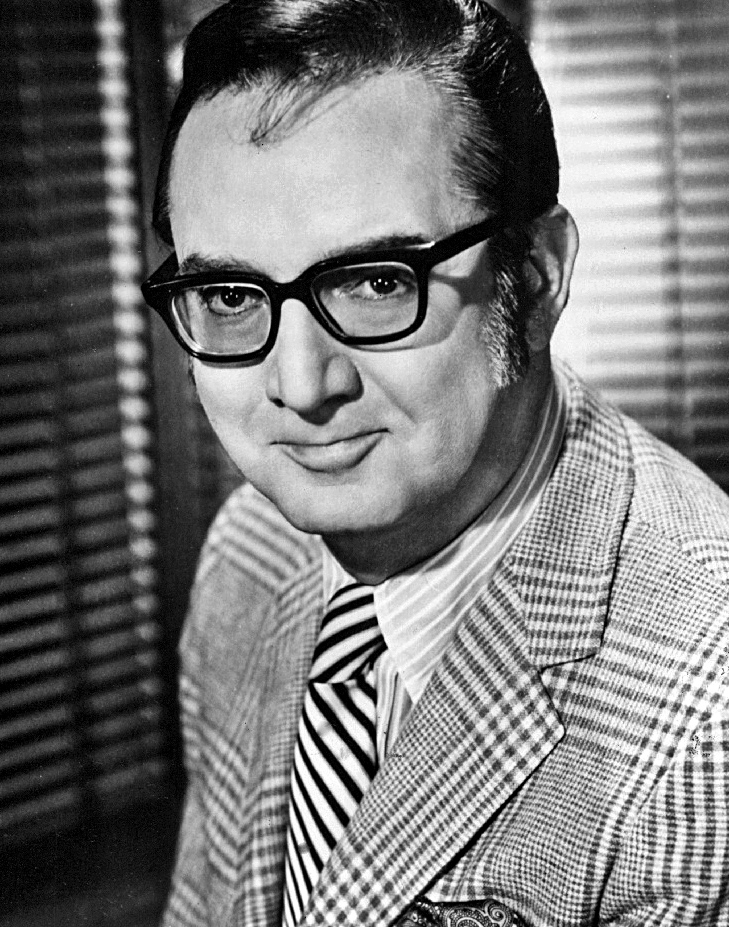
Steve Allen

- December 2 – Carlo Furno, Italian cardinal (d. 2015)
- December 3
  - Phyllis Curtin, American soprano (d. 2016)
  - Sonja Morawetz Sinclair, Canadian journalist, author and cryptographer (d. 2024)
  - Madiha Yousri, Egyptian actress (d. 2018)
- December 4
  - Deanna Durbin, Canadian singer (d. 2013)
  - Sanford K. Moats, American Air Force general (d. 2023)
- December 5 – Arnljot Strømme Svendsen, Norwegian economist and politician (d. 2022)
- December 6 – Otto Graham, American football player (d. 2003)
- December 7 – Eric Blackwood, Canadian-English aviator (d. 2007)
- December 10
  - Toh Chin Chye, Singaporean politician (d. 2012)
  - Howard Fredeen, Canadian animal breeding researcher (d. 2021)
  - Herbert Wahler, German Nazi war criminal (d. 2023)
- December 12 – Ira Neimark, American businessman and author (d. 2019)
- December 13 – Elda Cividino, Italian gymnast (d. 2014)
- December 14
  - Simon Towneley, English author (d. 2022)
  - Charley Trippi, American football player (d. 2022)
- December 15
  - Alan Freed, American disc jockey, known for introducing rock and roll to mainstream radio (d. 1965)
  - Nikolai Lebedev, Soviet-Russian actor (d. 2022)
- December 17 – Anne Golon, French writer (d. 2017)
- December 18 – Yuri Nikulin, Soviet/Russian actor, clown (d. 1997)
- December 19 – Blaže Koneski, Macedonian poet, linguist (d. 1993)
- December 20 – Gayraud Wilmore, American historian, theologian and educator (d. 2020)
- December 21 – Luigi Creatore, American songwriter, record producer (d. 2015)
- December 22 – Maurice Girardot, French Olympic basketball player (d. 2016)
- December 24
  - "Bullet" Bill Dudley, National Football League MVP 1946, Pro Football Hall of Fame 1966 (d. 2010)
  - Allan Edwards, Australian cricketer (d. 2019)
  - Francisco Pires, Portuguese footballer
- December 26
  - Steve Allen, American actor, composer, comedian, and author (d. 2000)
  - John Severin, American humorous, war and western cartoonist (Mad Comics, Cracked) (d. 2012)
- December 28
  - E. S. Campbell, American marine and author (d. 2020)
  - Philippe de Gaulle, French admiral and senator (d. 2024)
- December 29 – Ronald Ernest Aitchison, Scottish footballer (d. 1996)
- December 30 – Rashid Karami, 8-time prime minister of Lebanon (d. 1987)
- December 31 – Maurice Yaméogo, President of Upper Volta (d. 1993)

== Deaths ==
=== January–February ===
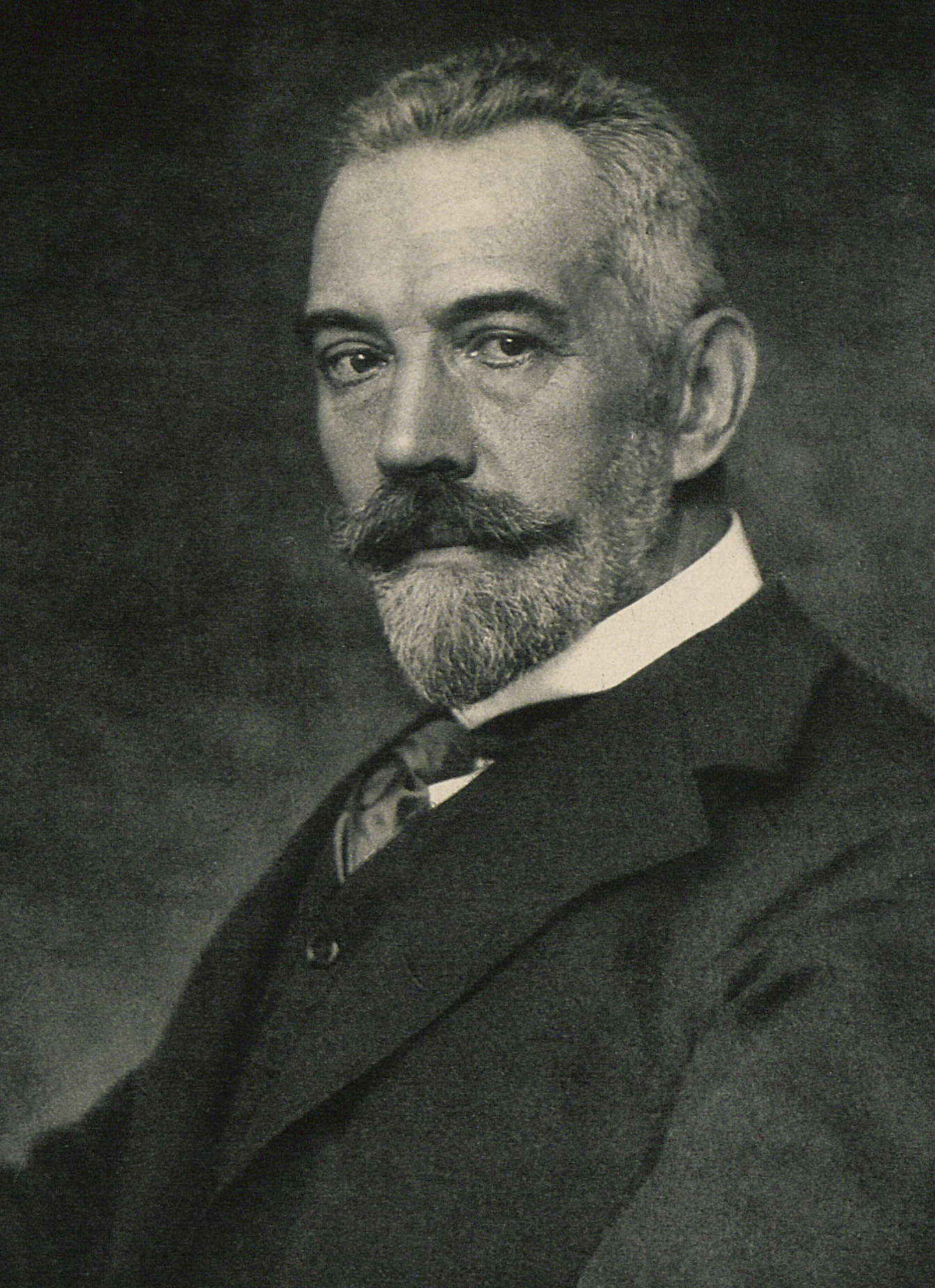
Theobald von Bethmann Hollweg

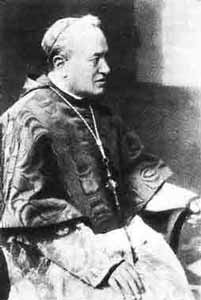
Blessed Andrea Carlo Ferrari

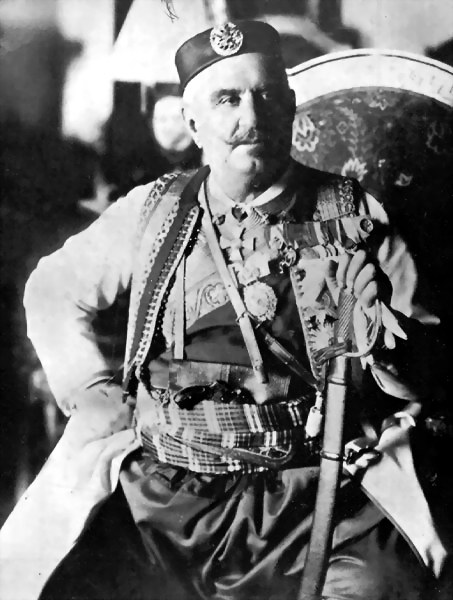
King Nicholas I of Montenegro

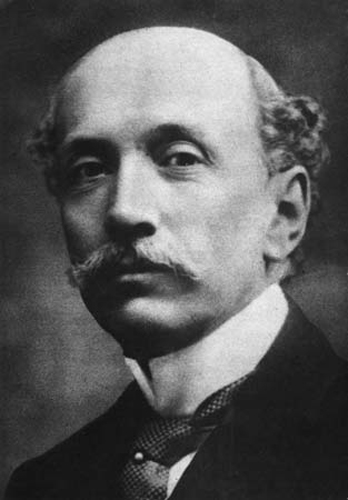
Eduardo Dato

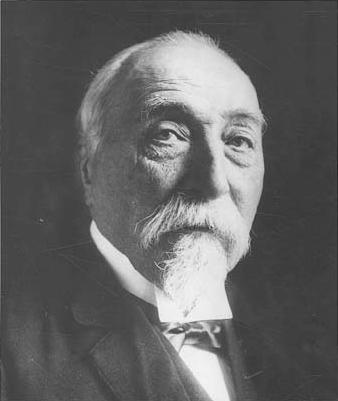
Emile Combes

- January 1 – Theobald von Bethmann Hollweg, 5th Chancellor of Germany (b. 1856)
- January 12 – Gervase Elwes, English tenor (b. 1866)
- January 18 – Adolf von Hildebrand, German sculptor (b. 1847)
- January 23 – Heinrich Wilhelm Gottfried von Waldeyer-Hartz, German anatomist (b. 1836)
- January 25 – William Thompson Sedgwick, American teacher, epidemiologist and bacteriologist (b. 1855)
- January 27 – Justiniano Borgoño, 37th Prime Minister of Peru (b. 1836)
- January 29 – H. G. Haugan, Norwegian-born American railroad, banking executive (b. 1840)
- February 2
  - Andrea Carlo Ferrari, Italian Catholic cardinal and blessed (b. 1850)
  - Antonio Jacobsen, American maritime artist (b. 1850)
- February 8
  - George Formby Sr, English entertainer (tuberculosis; b. 1876)
  - Peter Kropotkin, Russian anarchist (b. 1842)
- February 22 – Ernst Gunther, Duke of Schleswig-Holstein (b. 1863)
- February 26 – Carl Menger, Austrian economist (b. 1840)
- February 27 – Schofield Haigh, English cricketer (b. 1871)

=== March–April ===
- March 1 – Nicholas I of Montenegro, exiled king (b. 1841)
- March 2 – Champ Clark, American politician (b. 1850)
- March 3 – Auguste Mercier, French general, politician (b. 1833)
- March 8 – Eduardo Dato, Spanish politician, 3-time Prime Minister of Spain (b. 1856) (assassinated)
- March 15 – Talaat Pasha, Ottoman Turkish ruler, initiator of the Armenian Genocide (b. 1874) (assassinated)
- March 16 – Abraham Grünbaum (activist), German Jewish activist. (b. 1885)
- March 22 – Edward Theodore Compton, English-German painter and mountain climber (b. 1849)
- March 29 – John Burroughs, American naturalist, essayist (b. 1837)
- April 1 – Sir Edmund Poë, British admiral (b. 1849)
- April 2 – Charles Blackader, British general (b. 1869)
- April 8 – James H. Jones, American coachman and confidential courier for Jefferson Davis and later a North Carolina local public official
- April 11 – Augusta Victoria of Schleswig-Holstein, last German Empress, wife of Kaiser Wilhelm II (b. 1858)
- April 17 – Manwel Dimech, Maltese philosopher, social reformer (b. 1860)
- April 20 – Tony Jackson, American jazz musician (b. 1882)
- April 24 – Warington Baden-Powell, British admiralty lawyer (b. 1847)
- April 29 – Arthur Mold, English cricketer (b. 1863)

=== May–June ===
- May 4 – Alfred Hermann Fried, Austrian writer, pacifist and recipient of the Nobel Peace Prize (b. 1864)
- May 9 – William Henry Chamberlin, American philosopher (b. 1870)
- May 12
  - Sir Melville Macnaghten, British police officer (b. 1853)
  - Emilia Pardo Bazán, Spanish writer (b. 1851)
  - Rudolf Stöger-Steiner von Steinstätten, Austro-Hungarian general and politician (b. 1861)
- May 19
  - Edward Douglass White, 9th Chief Justice of the United States (b. 1845)
  - Michael Llewelyn Davies, one of the "Lost Boys" for the Peter Pan book (b. 1900)
- May 25
  - Émile Combes, French statesman, 69th Prime Minister of France (b. 1835)
  - Sir Arthur Wilson, British admiral of the fleet (b. 1842)
- May 29 –Euthymios (Agritellis), Greek Orthodox bishop and saint. (b. 1876)
- May 31–June 1 – A.C. Jackson, African-American surgeon
- June 1 – Soeria Atmadja, Sundanese politician and noble, Regent of Sumedang (1851 – 1921) (b. 1851)
- June 5
  - Laura Bromwell, American stunt pilot (b. 1897)
  - Georges Feydeau, French playwright (b. 1862)
- June 11 – Patriarch Leonid of Georgia (b. 1860)
- June 18
  - Eduardo Acevedo Díaz, Uruguayan writer (b. 1851)
  - Abdul Awwal Jaunpuri, Indian Islamic scholar and author (b. 1867)
- June 28 – Gyorche Petrov, Macedonian, Bulgarian revolutionary (b. 1865) (assassinated)
- June 29
  - Lady Randolph Churchill, mother of Winston Churchill (b. 1854)
  - Otto Seeck, German classical historian (b. 1850)

=== July–August ===
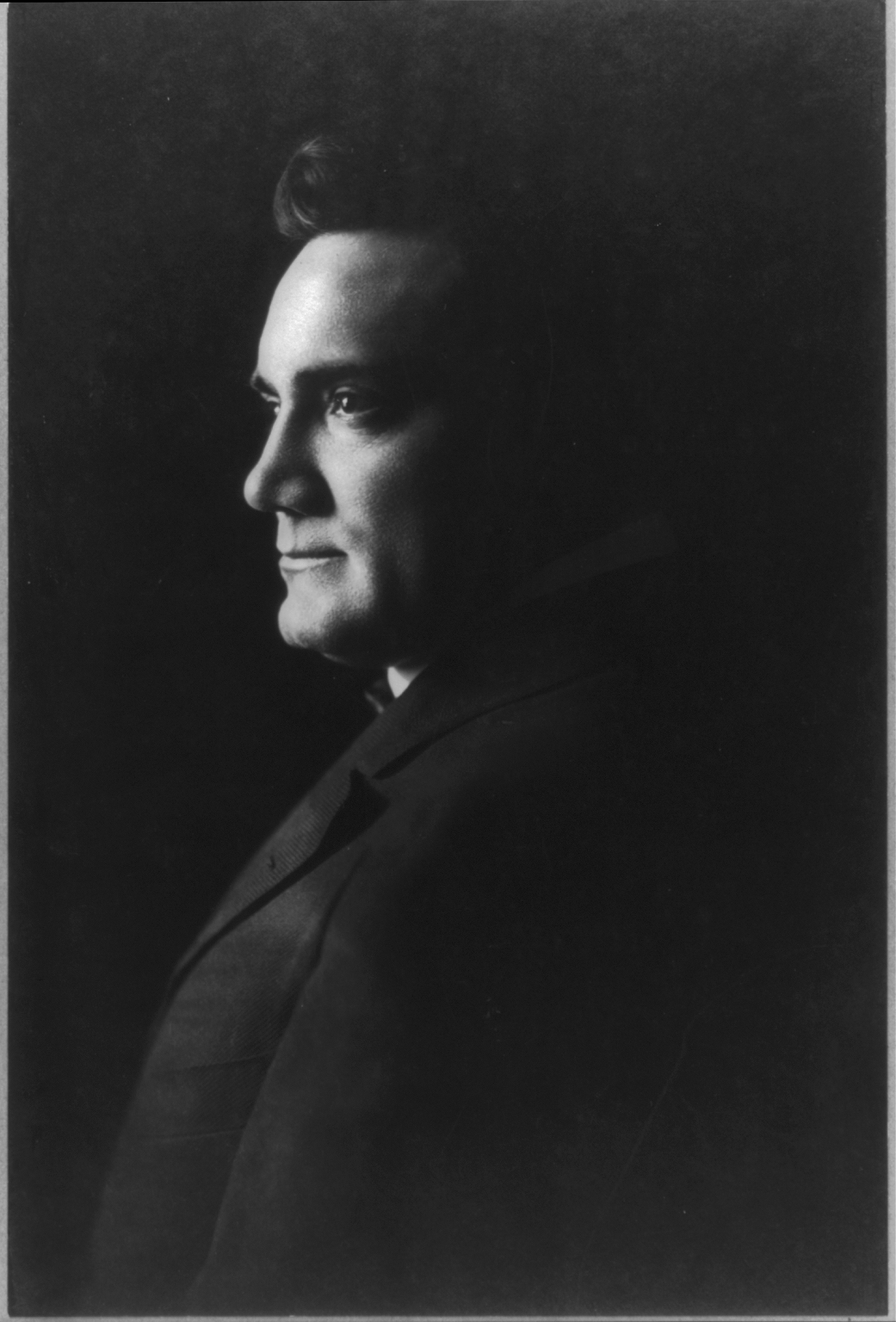
Enrico Caruso

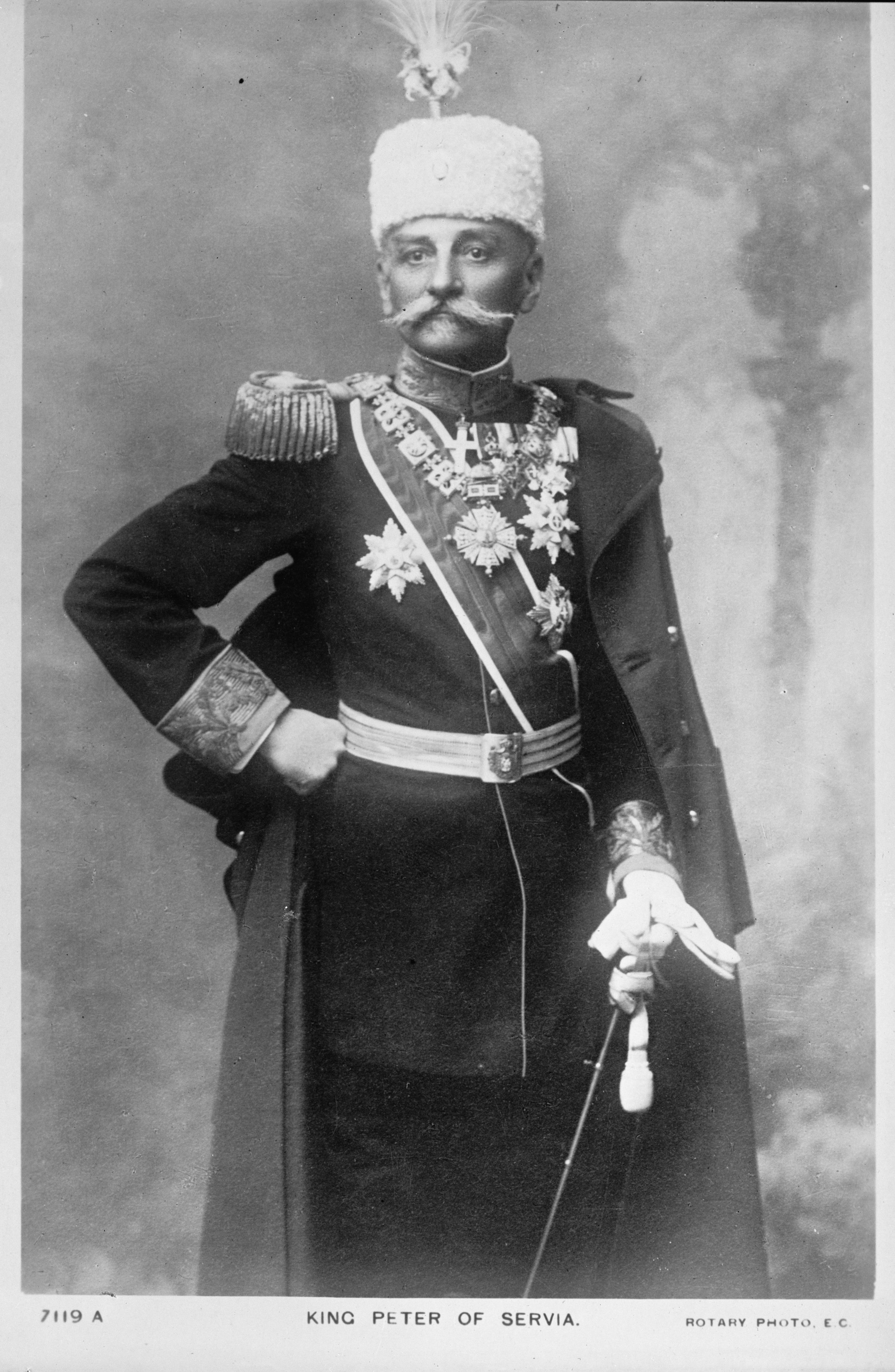
Peter I of Serbia

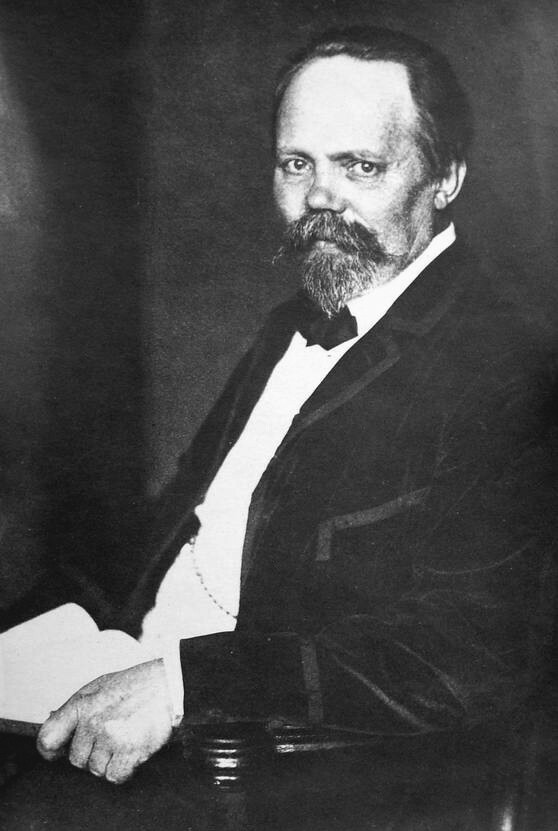
Engelbert Humperdinck

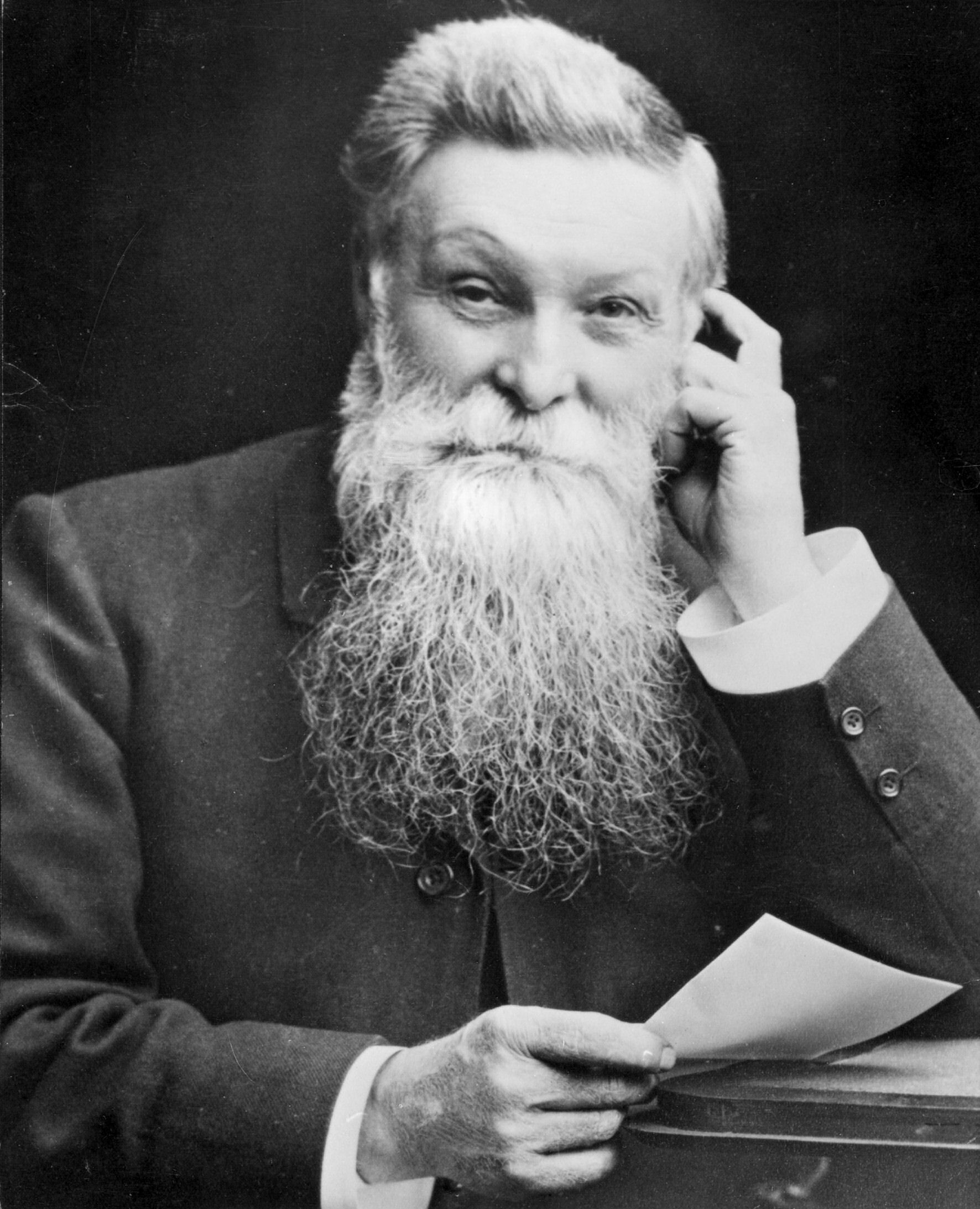
John Boyd Dunlop

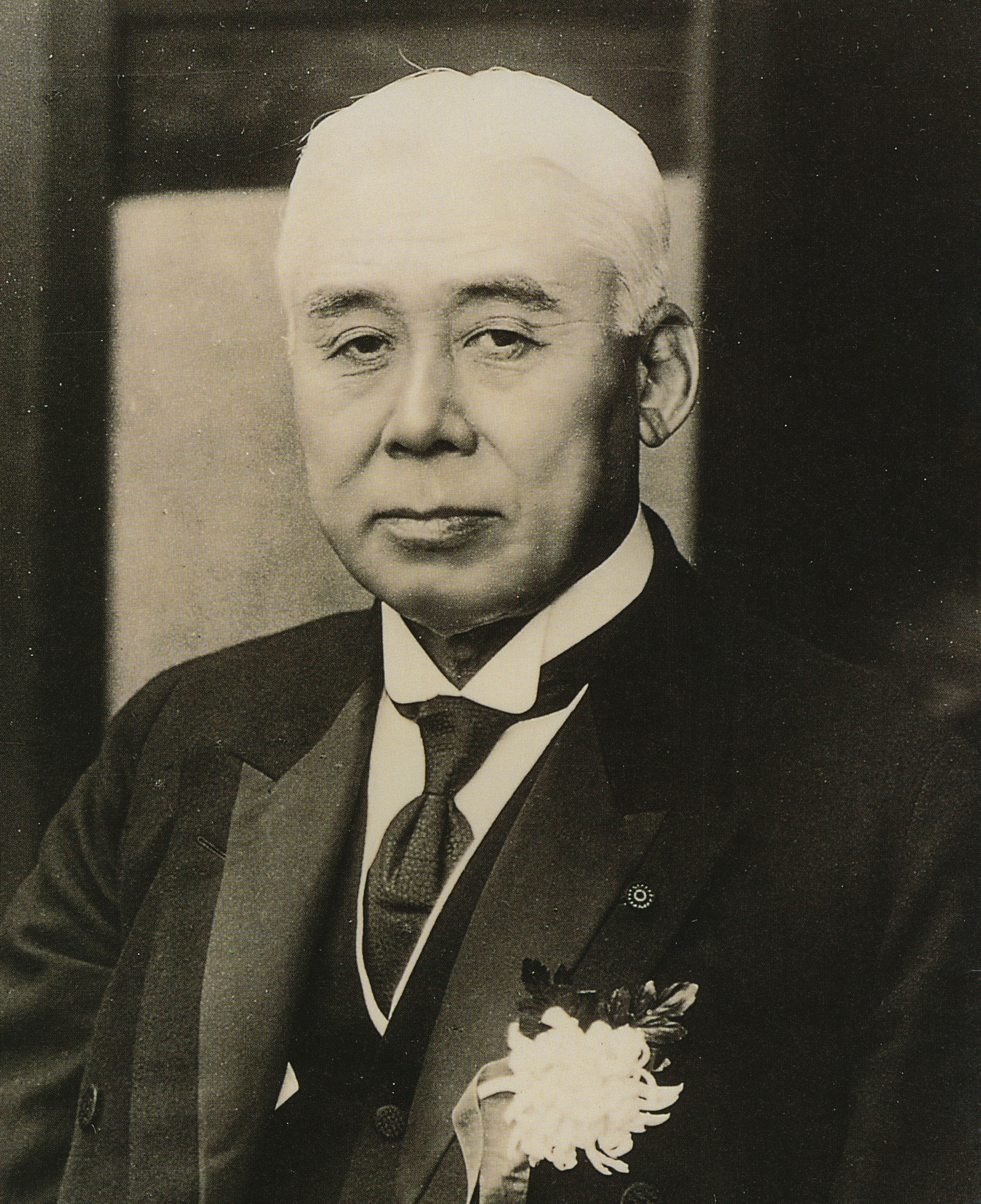
Hara Takashi

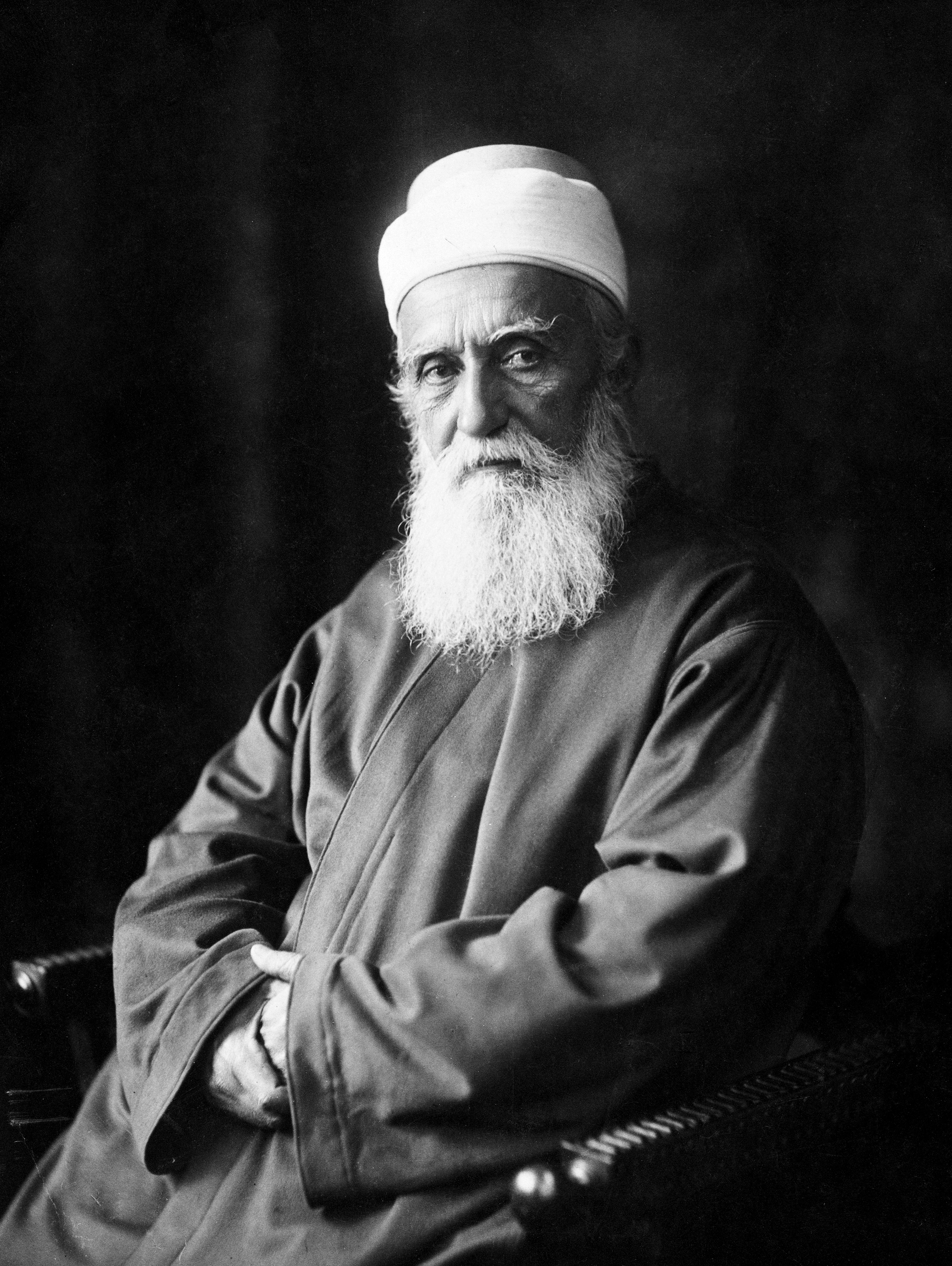
Abdul-Baha

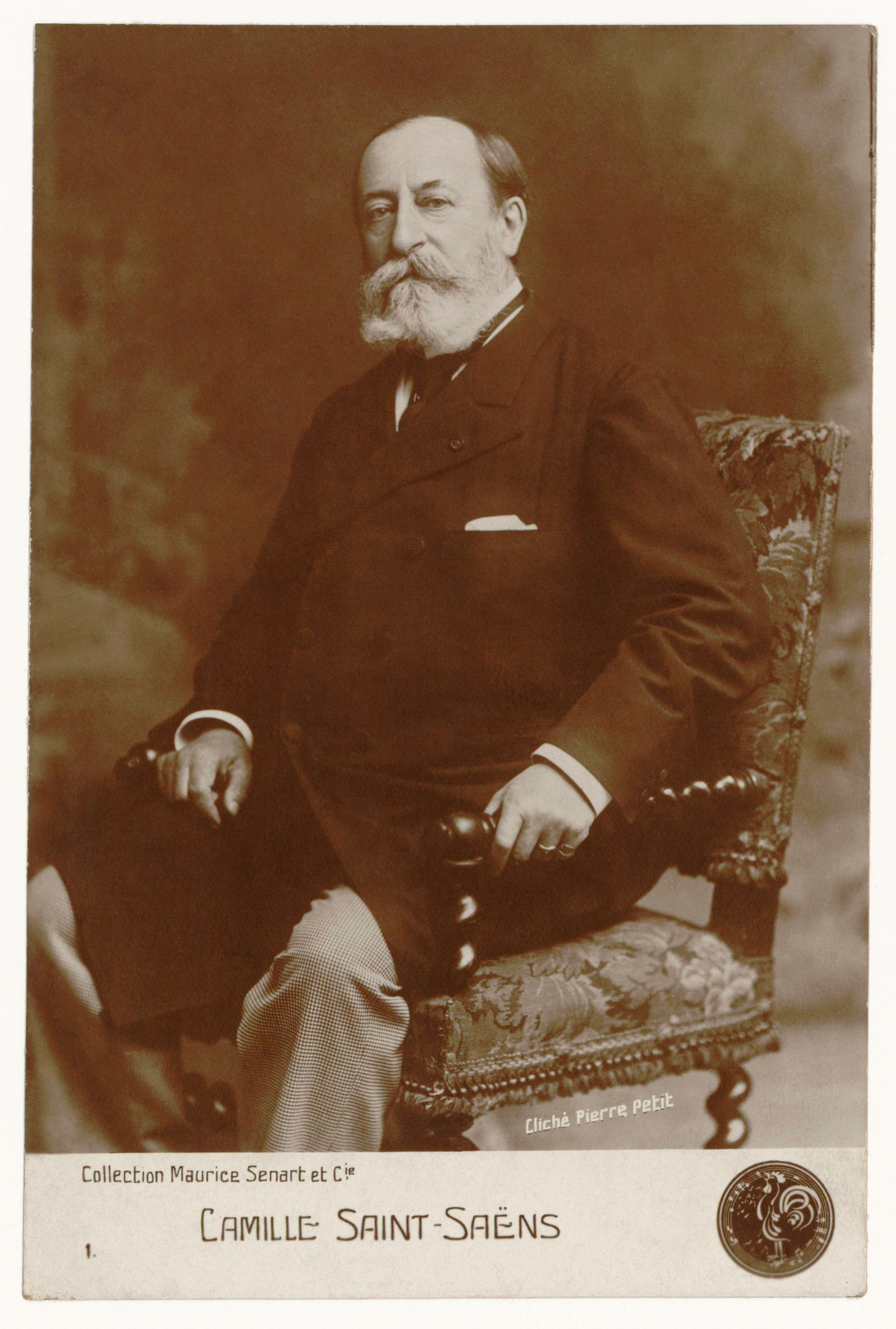
Camille Saint-Saens

- July 1 – Maurice Bailloud, French general (b. 1847)
- July 3 – Prince Philipp of Saxe-Coburg and Gotha (b. 1844)
- July 12 – Gabriel Lippmann, Luxembourger-French physicist, academic and Nobel Prize laureate (b. 1845)
- July 20 – Orestes St. John, American geologist and paleontologist (b. 1841)
- July 22 – Manuel Fernández Silvestre, Spanish general (killed in action or suicide) (b. 1871)
- July 26 – Howard Vernon, Australian actor (b. 1848)
- August 2 – Enrico Caruso, Italian tenor (b. 1873)
- August 7 – Alexander Blok, Russian poet (b. 1880)
- August 8
  - Juhani Aho, Finnish author and journalist (b. 1861)
  - Maria Anna Rosa Caiani, Italian Roman Catholic nun and blessed (b. 1863)
- August 16 – Peter I of Serbia, King of Yugoslavia (b. 1844)
- August 26
  - Matthias Erzberger, German politician (assassinated; b. 1875)
  - Sándor Wekerle, 3-time prime minister of Hungary (b. 1848)
- August 31 – Karl von Bülow, German field marshal (b. 1846)

=== September–October ===
- September 7 – Maria Angela Picco, Italian Roman Catholic religious professed and blessed (b. 1867)
- September 9 – Virginia Rappe, American model, actress (b. 1891)
- September 10 – John Tengo Jabavu, editor of South Africa's first newspaper in Xhosa (b. 1859)
- September 11
  - Prince Louis of Battenberg, British naval officer, German prince (b. 1854)
  - Subramania Bharati, Tamil poet (b. 1882)
- September 15 - Roman von Ungern Sternberg, Khan of Mongolia (b. 1886)
- September 22 – Ivan Vazov, Bulgarian poet (b. 1850)
- September 27 – Engelbert Humperdinck, German composer (b. 1854)
- October 1 – Julius von Hann, Austrian meteorologist (b. 1839)
- October 2 – King William II of Württemberg (b. 1848)
- October 12 – Philander C. Knox, American politician (b. 1853)
- October 15 – Haydar Khan Amo-oghli, Iranian revolutionary (b. 1860)
- October 17 – Yaa Asantewaa, Asante warrior queen (b. c. 1840)
- October 18 – Ludwig III of Bavaria, last king of Bavaria (b. 1845)
- October 21 – William Wallace Wotherspoon, American general (b. 1850)
- October 23 – John Boyd Dunlop, British-born Irish inventor, veterinary surgeon (b. 1840)
- October 25 – Bat Masterson, American gunfighter (b. 1853)
- October 28 – William Speirs Bruce, British marine biologist and antarctic explorer (b. 1867)

=== November–December ===
- November 4 – Hara Takashi, Japanese politician, 10th Prime Minister of Japan (b. 1856) (assassinated)
- November 7 – Peter Conover Hains, major general in the United States Army, and veteran of the American Civil War, Spanish–American War, and First World War (b. 1840)
- November 12 – Fernand Khnopff, Belgian painter (b. 1858)
- November 13 – Ignác Goldziher, Hungarian orientalist (b. 1850)
- November 14 – Isabel, Princess Imperial of Brazil, daughter of Emperor Pedro II of Brazil (b. 1846)
- November 22
  - Christina Nilsson, Swedish operatic soprano (b. 1843)
  - Edward J. Adams, American serial/spree killer and bank robber (b.1887)
- November 26
  - Émile Cartailhac, French prehistorian (b. 1845)
  - Charles W. Whittlesey, United States Army officer, commander of the "Lost Battalion" in World War I (suicide) (b. 1884)
- November 27 – Sir Douglas Cameron, Canadian politician, Lieutenant Governor of Manitoba (b. 1854)
- November 28 – `Abdu'l-Bahá, head of the Baháʼí Faith (b. 1844)
- November 29 – George Stephen, 1st Baron Mount Stephen, Canadian businessman (b. 1829)
- November 30
  - Madeleine Brès, French physician (b. 1842)
  - Hermann Schwarz, German mathematician (b. 1843)
- December 10 – George Ashlin, Irish architect (b. 1837)
- December 12 – Henrietta Swan Leavitt, American astronomer (b. 1868)
- December 16 – Camille Saint-Saëns, French composer (b. 1835)
- December 20
  - Hans Hartwig von Beseler, German general (b. 1850)
  - Dmitri Parsky, Russian general (b. 1866)
  - Julius Richard Petri, German microbiologist (b. 1852)
- December 24 – Misu Sōtarō, Japanese admiral (b. 1855)

== Nobel Prizes ==

- Physics – Albert Einstein
- Chemistry – Frederick Soddy
- Medicine – (not awarded)
- Literature – Anatole France
- Peace – Karl Hjalmar Branting, Christian Lous Lange

== Sources ==
- New International Year Book: 1921 (1922) online edition
- 1921 Aviation Comes North- NWT Historical Timeline- A Prince of Wales Northern Heritage Centre Online Exhibit
