= 1921 in the United Kingdom =

Events from the year 1921 in the United Kingdom.

== Incumbents ==
- Monarch – George V
- Prime Minister – David Lloyd George (Coalition)

== Events ==
=== January to June ===
- 1 January – Car tax discs introduced.
- 8 January – Chequers becomes the official country residence of the Prime Minister.
- 14 January – Unemployment stands at 927,000.
- 17 January – The first recorded public performance of the illusion of "sawing a woman in half" is given by stage magician P. T. Selbit at the Finsbury Park Empire variety theatre in London.
- 20 January – Royal Navy K-class submarine HMS K5 sinks in the English Channel with the loss of all 57 crew on board.
- 26 January – Abermule train collision: seventeen people are killed when two passenger trains collide head-on in Montgomeryshire.
- January – Lord Rothermere's Sunday Pictorial announces formation of the Anti-Waste League as a political party opposing excessive government expenditure.
- 12 February – Winston Churchill is appointed as Colonial Secretary.
- 16 February – Unemployment now stands at over 1,000,000. The Government announces an increase in unemployment benefit.
- 21 February – Conference of London of 1921–1922 convenes in an attempt to resolve problems arising from the dissolution of the Ottoman Empire.
- 1 March – The Australia national cricket team, led by Warwick Armstrong, becomes the first to complete a whitewash of the touring England team in The Ashes, something that will not be repeated for 86 years. This summer, the Australian cricket team in England will go on to win their first three Test matches.
- 5 March – Irish War of Independence: Clonbanin Ambush – Irish Republican Army kills Brigadier General Cumming.
- 11 March – Queen Mary becomes the first woman to be awarded an honorary degree by the University of Oxford.
- 16 March – The United Kingdom signs a trade agreement with the Russian SFSR.
- 17 March
  - Bonar Law, the Conservative Party leader, resigns due to ill health.
  - Dr Marie Stopes opens the United Kingdom's first birth control clinic in Holloway, London.
- 19 March – Irish War of Independence: Crossbarry Ambush – British troops fail to encircle an outnumbered column of Irish Republican Army volunteers in County Cork, with at least ten British and three IRA deaths.
- 21 March
  - Austen Chamberlain replaces Bonar Law as Conservative leader.
  - Irish War of Independence: Headford Ambush – The IRA kills at least nine British troops.
- 26 March – Shaun Spadah wins the Grand National, ridden by Dick Rees.
- 31 March – The government formally returns the coal mines from wartime control to their private owners, who demand wage cuts; in response, the Miners' Federation of Great Britain calls on its partner trade unions in the Triple Alliance to join it in strike action, leading in turn to the government declaring a state of emergency for the first time under the Emergency Powers Act 1920.
- 1 April
  - Lockout of striking coal miners begins.
  - Airship R36, the first to carry a British civilian registration (G-FAAF), makes her maiden flight from William Beardmore and Company's works at Inchinnan, Scotland. (Work on R37 at Cardington Airfield was suspended in February.)
- 3 April – Coal rationing begins.
- 13 April – Lloyds Bank takes over Fox, Fowler and Company of Wellington, Somerset, the last provincial English bank to issue its own banknotes.
- 15 April
  - "Black Friday": Transport union members of the 'Triple Alliance' refuse to support national strike action by coal miners.
  - National Unemployed Workers' Committee Movement set up by members of the Communist Party.
- 23 April – Tottenham Hotspur F.C. beat Wolverhampton Wanderers 1–0 in the FA Cup Final.
- 26 April – Police patrol London on motorcycles for the first time.
- 3 May – The province of Northern Ireland is created within the United Kingdom under terms of the Government of Ireland Act 1920.
- 4 May – The IRA kill a former Royal Irish Constabulary inspector in Glasgow.
- 5 May
  - London Schedule of Payments sets out the World War I reparations payable by the German Weimar Republic and other countries considered successors to the Central Powers.
  - Only thirteen paying spectators attend the football match between Leicester City and Stockport County played at Old Trafford, the lowest attendance in The Football League's history.
- 7 May – Crown Prince Hirohito of Japan arrives on an official visit.
- 15 May – The British Legion is founded as a voice for ex-servicemen by merger of the Comrades of the Great War, the National Association of Discharged Sailors and Soldiers, the National Federation of Discharged and Demobilized Sailors and Soldiers and the Officers' Association, under the Presidency of Earl Haig.
- 22 May – The United States beats the United Kingdom 9 rounds to 3 in the first golf international between the two countries.
- 24 May – Irish elections, under terms of the Government of Ireland Act 1920: In the Northern Ireland general election for the new Parliament of Northern Ireland (held by single transferable vote), Ulster Unionists win 40 out of 52 seats. The dominant-party system in Northern Ireland will last for fifty years.
- 25 May – Irish War of Independence: the Irish Republican Army occupies and burns the Custom House, Dublin, the centre of local government in Ireland. Five IRA men are killed, and over eighty are captured by the British Army which surrounds the building.
- 1 June – Humorist wins The Derby. For the first time the result is broadcast live by Wireless.
- 6 June – King George V opens Southwark Bridge in London.
- 7 June
  - The new Parliament of Northern Ireland assembles in Belfast City Hall; James Craig is elected as first Prime Minister of Northern Ireland.
  - J. M. M. Erskine, standing as an "Independent Anti-Waste" candidate, wins the Westminster St George's parliamentary seat in a by-election.
- 10 June – Unemployment reaches 2,200,000.
- 12 June – Sunday postal collection and delivery is suspended.
- 14 June – First performance of the orchestral version of Vaughan Williams's The Lark Ascending conducted by Adrian Boult with Marie Hall as violin soloist in a concert at the Queen's Hall in London.
- 15 June – 2,000,000 workers are currently involved in pay disputes.
- 19 June – 1921 United Kingdom census (excluding Ireland), the first to ask about work. A surplus of 1.7M women over men is recorded, largely a result of World War I casualties.
- 22 June – New Parliament of Northern Ireland, assembled at Belfast City Hall, is formally opened by King George V, making a speech (drafted by Jan Smuts) calling for reconciliation in Ireland.
- 24 June – The world's largest airship, the R.38, makes its maiden flight at Bedford.
- 25 June – Rainfall ends a drought which has lasted for one hundred days.
- 28 June – The coal strike ends with the Miners' Federation of Great Britain obliged to accept pay cuts and no national bargaining.

=== July to December ===
- 2 July – Bill Tilden and Suzanne Lenglen retain their Wimbledon Championships titles.
- 7 July – General Jan Smuts meets King George V to discuss the Irish situation.
- 9 July – The Irish War of Independence comes officially to an end when a truce, coming into effect at noon on 11 July, is agreed between British and Irish forces.
- 10/11 July – Heatwave with temperatures in the 90s in some parts of South-East England.
- 10 July – Bloody Sunday: clashes between Catholics and Protestants in Belfast result in sixteen deaths (23 over the surrounding four-day period) and the destruction of over two hundred (mostly Catholic) homes.
- 12 July – Sinn Féin representatives arrive in London for talks.
- 18 July – Ulster Unionist negotiators walk out of the truce talks in London.
- 28 July – First registration of practitioners of dentistry under the Dentists Act, making it a fully regulated profession.
- 3 August – "Geddes Axe": announcement that the Prime Minister is appointing an advisory Committee on National Expenditure, made up of businessmen chaired by Sir Eric Geddes, to recommend reductions in government spending.
- 19 August – Unemployment falls to 1,640,600.
- 24 August – Airship R.38 explodes on her fourth test flight near Kingston upon Hull, killing 44 of the 49 Anglo-American crew on board.
- 27 August – The first games in the new Football League Third Division North are played, a year after the southern section was formed. Among the new division's members are Stockport County, Walsall, Rochdale, Chesterfield and Tranmere Rovers.
- 30 August – England defeat Australia, for the first time this year, in the final Test match.
- 1 September – Poplar Rates Rebellion: led by George Lansbury, the Borough council in Poplar, London withholds collection of part of its rates, leading to six weeks' imprisonment for thirty councillors (including six women) and hasty passage of The London Authorities (Financial Provision) Act through Parliament to equalise tax burdens between rich and poor boroughs.
- 7 September – David Lloyd George summons a meeting of the Cabinet at Inverness to discuss an independent Ireland's relationship with the British Empire.
- 9 September – Charlie Chaplin visits London and is met by thousands.
- 17 September – Shackleton–Rowett Expedition: Ernest Shackleton sets sail on his last expedition to Antarctica.
- 23 September – The second female MP enters Parliament (Margaret Wintringham, in succession to her late husband at the Louth by-election).
- October – The first women are admitted to study for full academic degrees at the University of Cambridge, but have no associated privileges.
- 8 October – The steamer SS Rowan sinks off the coast of Scotland. Twenty-two people lose their lives.
- 11 October – The Irish Treaty Conference opens in London.
- 11 November – The British Legion holds the first official Poppy Day.
- 21 November – Troops are sent to restore order after rioting breaks out in East Belfast.
- 22 November – At least ten people are killed in widespread shootings in Belfast.
- 30 November – Sir Basil Thomson retires after forty years as the head of the Metropolitan Police Special Branch.
- 6 December – British and Irish negotiators sign the Anglo-Irish Treaty in London giving independence to the Irish Free State.
- 9 December – John William Gott becomes the last person in England imprisoned for blasphemous libel.
- 10 December – Frederick Soddy wins the Nobel Prize in Chemistry "for his contributions to our knowledge of the chemistry of radioactive substances, and his investigations into the origin and nature of isotopes".
- 13 December – In the Four-Power Treaty on Insular Possessions, the Empire of Japan, United Kingdom, United States and French Third Republic agree to recognize the status quo in the Pacific.
- 16 December – Parliament ratifies the Anglo-Irish Treaty.

=== Undated ===
- The Scottish county of Haddingtonshire is renamed East Lothian.
- Wicksteed Park in Kettering opens as the first inland amusement park in England.
- An exceptionally dry year over England and Wales with only 629.0 millimetres (24.8 in) making it the driest year on record since 1788, and not approached subsequently. In South East England the average is only 396.4 millimetres (15.6 in) with some stations recording less than 300 millimetres (11.8 in). It reaches 34C (94F) in Southern and Eastern England on 10 and 11 July.

== Publications ==
- Dorita Fairlie Bruce's children's novel The Senior Prefect, first of The Dimsie books.
- Agatha Christie's first novel The Mysterious Affair at Styles, introducing Hercule Poirot (21 January; issued in the United States October 1920).
- Walter de la Mare's novel Memoirs of a Midget.
- Eleanor Farjeon's children's stories Martin Pippin in the Apple Orchard.
- John Galsworthy's novel To Let, last of The Forsyte Saga.
- A. S. M. Hutchinson's novel If Winter Comes.
- Aldous Huxley's novel Crome Yellow.
- Sheila Kaye-Smith's novel Joanna Godden.
- D. H. Lawrence's novel Women in Love (10 June; issued in a limited edition in the United States November 1920).

== Births ==
- 1 January
  - Barbara Goalen, model (died 2002)
  - John Strawson, English general and military writer (died 2014)
  - Helen Yate, swimmer (died 2020)
- 2 January
  - Kenneth Griffith, actor (died 2006)
  - Walter Harrison, politician (died 2012)
- 4 January
  - Eric Bradbury, comic artist (died 2001)
  - Katharine Macmillan, Viscountess Macmillan of Ovenden, politician and aristocrat (died 2017)
- 8 January – John Lambert, diplomat (died 2015)
- 9 January
  - Robin Coombs, immunologist (died 2006)
  - Roy Farran, soldier and author (died 2006)
- 10 January
  - Peggy Evans, actress (died 2015)
  - Andrew Humphrey, senior officer (died 1977)
- 11 January – Kathleen Byron, actress (died 2009)
- 12 January – Jim Mortimer, trade unionist (died 2013)
- 14 January – Kenneth Bulmer, author (died 2005)
- 15 January
  - John Terraine, military historian (died 2003)
  - Frank Thornton, actor (died 2013)
- 16 January
  - Geoffrey Eastop, potter (died 2014)
  - George Thomson, journalist and politician (died 2008)
- 18 January
  - Alfred Ball, air marshal (died 2012)
  - Roy Orrock, World War II pilot (died 2002)
- 20 January
  - Dick Hern, racehorse trainer (died 2002)
  - Mike Peyton, cartoonist (died 2017)
- 21 January – Charles Eric Maine, writer (died 1981)
- 22 January
  - Kevin Stoney, actor (died 2008)
  - Arthur Turner, footballer (died 2019)
- 23 January – Mary Wixey, track and field athlete (died 2017)
- 24 January – Charles Jacob, stockbroker (died 2015)
- 25 January
  - Peter Bayley, academic (died 2015)
  - Peter Jost, mechanical engineer (died 2016)
- 26 January – Elisabeth Kirkby, English-born Australian actress, writer and politician (died 2026)
- 27 January – Maurice Macmillan, politician (died 1984)
- 31 January
  - Jimmy Deane, Trotskyist (died 2002)
  - Arthur Goddard, English-born Australian engineer (died 2022)
  - Ralph Harris, journalist (died 2008)
- 1 February
  - Peter Sallis, actor (died 2017)
  - Patricia Robins, writer and WAAF officer (died 2016)
- 3 February – George E. Felton, French-born computer scientist (died 2019)
- 4 February
  - Peter Ashmore, admiral (died 2002)
  - Branse Burbridge, World War Two fighter pilot (died 2016)
- 5 February
  - Marion Eames, novelist (died 2007)
  - John Pritchard, conductor (died 1989)
  - Sir Ken Adam, German-born British production designer (died 2016)
- 6 February – Margaret Moncrieff, cellist (died 2008)
- 7 February
  - Tito Burns, musician (died 2010)
  - Denis Shaw, character actor (died 1971)
- 9 February – Leslie Collier, virologist (died 2011)
- 14 February – Graham Leggett, RAF squadron leader (died 2013)
- 16 February
  - Bob Evans, Welsh rugby union player (died 2003)
  - John Galbraith Graham, crossword compiler and priest (died 2013)
  - John Hasted, physicist and musician (died 2002)
  - Gerard Mansell, BBC executive (died 2010)
- 17 February – John Hasted, physicist and musician (died 2002)
- 20 February – Alex Thomson, Scottish rugby union player (died 2010)
- 21 February – Morris Beckman, writer and anti-fascist activist (died 2015)
- 22 February – David Greene, actor and film director (died 2003)
- 24 February – Pat Kirkwood, actress (died 2007)
- 26 February – Frank Caldwell, army general (died 2014)
- 28 February – J. F. C. Harrison, historian (died 2018)
- 1 March
  - Kenny Baker, jazz trumpeter (died 1999)
  - Jack Clayton, film director (died 1995)
  - Michael Kerr, German-born judge (died 2002)
- 2 March
  - Christopher Lloyd, gardener and gardening writer (died 2006)
  - Robert Simpson, composer (died 1997)
- 4 March
  - Jane Fawcett, codebreaker, singer and heritage preservationist (died 2016)
  - Joan Greenwood, actress (died 1987)
  - John Ryan, cartoonist (died 2009)
- 7 March – Eleanor Summerfield, actress (died 2001)
- 10 March
  - William Blezard, composer (died 2003)
  - John Christoforou, painter (died 2014)
- 11 March – Philip Rahtz, archaeologist (died 2011)
- 12 March – Joe Fagan, footballer and manager (died 2001)
- 13 March
  - Cyril Poole, cricketer (died 1996)
  - Gitta Sereny, Austrian-born author (died 2012)
- 15 March
  - David Cobb, marine artist (died 2014)
  - Philip Powell, architect (died 2003)
- 16 March – Eileen Nearne, agent (died 2010)
- 18 March – Arthur Keily, marathon runner (died 2016)
- 19 March
  - Chris Barber, businessman (died 2012)
  - Tommy Cooper, Welsh-born comedian and magician (died 1984)
- 21 March – Antony Hopkins, composer, conductor and pianist (died 2014)
- 22 March – Tim Vigors, World War II fighter pilot (died 2003)
- 23 March
  - Donald Campbell, water and land speed record seeker (died 1967)
  - Geoffrey Chater, actor and poet (died 2021)
  - David Ince, Scottish World War II RAF officer (died 2017)
- 25 March
  - Mary Douglas, social anthropologist (died 2007)
  - Peter Horsley, RAF commander (died 2001)
- 26 March – Julie Harris, costume designer (died 2015)
- 27 March
  - Harry Clarke, footballer and cricketer (died 2015)
  - Richard Marner, actor (born in the Soviet Union; died 2004)
- 28 March – Dirk Bogarde, actor and author (died 1999)
- 29 March
  - Johnny Lawrenson, English rugby league winger (died 2010)
  - Hugh Neill, businessman (died 2017)
  - Tony Sutton, cricketer (died 2019)
- 30 March
  - Tony Honoré, lawyer and jurist (died 2019)
  - Elizabeth Sutherland, 24th Countess of Sutherland, Scottish noblewoman (died 2019)
- 31 March
  - James I. C. Boyd, author and railway historian (died 2009)
  - Milein Cosman, German-born artist (died 2017)
  - Roy Houghton, footballer (died 2017)
- 1 April
  - William J. Fishman, academic (died 2014)
  - Steve Race, pianist, composer and radio presenter (died 2009)
- 5 April
  - Patricia Ford, Northern Irish politician (died 1995)
  - Les Jackson, English cricketer (died 2007)
  - Christopher Hewett, English actor (died 2001)
- 6 April – Philip Moore, Baron Moore of Wolvercote, private secretary to Queen Elizabeth II (died 2009)
- 9 April – George Bryan, businessman (died 2013)
- 10 April
  - Elizabeth Innes, paediatric haematologist (died 2015)
  - Robert Wade, New Zealand-born chess player (died 2008)
- 13 April – Joan Rhodes, actress and entertainer (died 2010)
- 15 April – Charlie Kelsall, Welsh footballer (died 2019)
- 16 April – Peter Ustinov, actor, writer, dramatist and raconteur (died 2004)
- 17 April – Jack Watson, cricketer (died 2012)
- 20 April – Peter Baker, English soldier, author, publisher and politician (died 1966)
- 21 April – Joe Mence, cricketer (died 2014)
- 23 April
  - Gerald Campion, actor (died 2002)
  - Derek Granger, producer and screenwriter (died 2022)
- 25 April
  - Lawrence Allen, Olympic racewalker (died 2018)
  - John Lucas, Army officer (died 2013)
- 27 April – John Stott, British Anglican cleric, Christian author (died 2011)
- 30 April – Gordon Mulholland, actor (died 2010)
- 1 May – Michael Willoughby, 12th Baron Middleton, peer and politician (died 2011)
- 3 May
  - Douglas Milmine, prelate (died 2017)
  - Gordon Murray, television producer and puppeteer (died 2016)
- 4 May
  - John Goodwin, theatre publicist and writer (died 2018)
  - Stephen Hastings, politician (died 2005)
  - Corran Purdon, Irish-born army major general (died 2018)
  - Norman Sillman, sculptor and coin designer (died 2013)
- 5 May
  - Mavis Batey, codebreaker (died 2013)
  - John Cavanagh, neurobiologist (died 2019)
- 6 May – Elizabeth Sellars, Scottish actress (died 2019)
- 7 May – Asa Briggs, historian (died 2016)
- 8 May – Graham Leonard, bishop (died 2010)
- 9 May – Rosemary Pratt, Marchioness Camden, artist, noblewoman and socialite (died 2004)
- 11 May – Geoffrey Crossley, race car driver (died 2002)
- 13 May – Bill Jones, footballer (died 2010)
- 15 May – Alan Huggins, judge (died 2009)
- 17 May
  - Jim Bradley, athletics coach (died 2015)
  - Dennis Brain, horn player (died 1957)
  - Owen Wade, medical researcher and physician (died 2008)
- 18 May
  - Joan Eardley, painter (died 1963)
  - Sir Anthony Epstein, medical researcher (died 2024)
  - Olgierd Zienkiewicz, academic (died 2009)
- 19 May
  - Leslie Broderick, Royal Air Force officer (died 2013)
  - Pauline Clarke, author (died 2013)
  - Leslie Sands, actor (died 2001)
- 21 May
  - Peggy Cripps, children's author and socialite (died 2006)
  - Sandy Douglas, computer scientist (died 2010)
- 22 May – John Francis Marchment Middleton, anthropologist (died 2009)
- 23 May
  - John Cloudsley-Thompson, naturalist and army officer (died 2013)
  - Humphrey Lyttelton, jazz musician and broadcaster (died 2008)
- 26 May – Stan Mortensen, English footballer (died 1991)
- 27 May – Bob Godfrey, animator (died 2013)
- 29 May – Elizabeth Kelly, actress (died 2025)
- 31 May – Edna Doré, actress (died 2014)
- 3 June – John Fage, historian (died 2002)
- 5 June
  - George Dews, cricketer (died 2003)
  - John Fenton, priest and scholar (died 2008)
- 8 June
  - Gordon Campbell, Baron Campbell of Croy, politician (died 2005)
  - Alwyn Williams, geologist (died 2004)
- 10 June – Prince Philip, Duke of Edinburgh, Greek-born royal and consort of the British monarch (died 2021)
- 11 June – Rodney Hill, mathematician (died 2011)
- 12 June – Christopher Derrick, writer (died 2007)
- 14 June – Leslie Gooday, architect (died 2013)
- 22 June – Roland Gibbs, head of the British Army, from 1976 to 1979 (died 2004)
- 23 June – Edward Sismore, RAF officer (died 2012)
- 25 June – Dennis Wilson, poet (died 2022)
- 27 June
  - Alan Colquhoun, architect, historian, critic and teacher (died 2012)
  - Muriel Pavlow, actress (died 2019)
- 29 June
  - Fiennes Cornwallis, 3rd Baron Cornwallis, life peer (died 2010)
  - Jean Kent, actress (died 2013)
- 3 July – R. E. G. Davies, aviation historian (died 2011)
- 4 July – Frederick Sydney Waller, shipbuilder (died 2016)
- 7 July – Joe Wade, English footballer and manager (died 2005)
- 8 July – Derek Rawcliffe, Anglican prelate (died 2011)
- 11 July – Gretel Beer, Austrian-born cookery and travel writer (died 2010)
- 13 July – Gerard Mansfield, admiral (died 2006)
- 14 July – Leon Garfield, children's historical novelist (died 1996)
- 15 July – Jean Heywood, actress (died 2019)
- 18 July – Peter Austin, brewer (died 2014)
- 19 July – Diana Elles, Baroness Elles, British barrister, United Nations representative from the United Kingdom (died 2009)
- 20 July – Bob Block, comedy writer (died 2011)
- 21 July – Felix Hope-Nicholson, aristocrat and genealogist (died 1990)
- 23 July
  - Robert Brown, actor (died 2003)
  - Harry Hookway, civil servant and chief executive (died 2014)
- 26 July – John S. R. Duncan, diplomat (died 2006)
- 29 July
  - Michael Davies, jurist (died 2006)
  - Bettina Shaw-Lawrence, painter (died 2018)
- 30 July – Diana Boddington, stage manager (died 2002)
- 31 July – Peter Benenson, lawyer and human rights campaigner (died 2005)
- 1 August
  - Joyce Baldwin, evangelical biblical scholar and theologist educator (died 1995)
  - Patrick Kay, general (died 2013)
- 4 August – Geoffrey Wellum, fighter pilot and author (died 2018)
- 5 August – Christopher Ewart-Biggs, ambassador and diplomat (died 1976)
- 6 August – Ronald Grierson, German-born banker and businessman (died 2014)
- 8 August
  - Alan Muir Wood, civil engineer (died 2009)
  - David Pears, philosopher (died 2009)
- 9 August – Patricia Marmont, actress (died 2020)
- 10 August – Jack Archer, athlete (died 1997)
- 11 August – Tom Kilburn, co-inventor of the Williams-Kilburn tube, used for memory in early computer systems (died 2001)
- 12 August – Patrick Howard-Dobson, army general (died 2009)
- 13 August - Mary Lee, singer (died 2022)
- 15 August – Patrick Nairne, civil servant (died 2013)
- 17 August – Elinor Lyon, children's writer (died 2008)
- 18 August
  - Francis Arthur Jefferson, World war army veteran (died 1982)
  - Norman MacKenzie, journalist, educationalist and historian (died 2013)
  - Gordon Thomas, Olympic silver-medal cyclist (died 2013)
- 20 August – Edward Williams, composer (died 2013)
- 22 August
  - James Menter, physicist (died 2006)
  - Tony Pawson, cricketer and writer (died 2012)
- 24 August
  - Dudley Kernick, footballer (died 2019)
  - Eric Simms, ornithologist, writer and conservationist (died 2009)
  - Sam Tingle, English-Zimbabwean racing driver (died 2008)
- 26 August – Alan Townsend, cricketer (died 2014)
- 27 August – Trevor Baker, meteorologist (died 2016)
- 29 August
  - Paddy Roy Bates, pirate radio broadcaster (died 2012)
  - Mary Donaldson, Baroness Donaldson of Lymington, politician (died 2003)
- 31 August – James Cleminson, soldier and businessman (died 2010)
- 1 September
  - Daphne Park, diplomat and spy (died 2010)
  - Austin Pearce, industrialist (died 2004)
- 3 September
  - Bert Bushnell, Olympic gold medal-winning rower (died 2010)
  - Thurston Dart, harpsichordist, conductor (died 1971)
  - Bill Dean, actor (died 2000)
  - Cab Kaye, jazz singer and pianist (died 2000)
  - Sydney Knowles, Royal Navy frogman (died 2012)
- 5 September – Kenneth Shearwood, cricketer (died 2018)
- 6 September – John Bickersteth, British Anglican prelate (died 2018)
- 7 September – Ronald Brown, politician (died 2002)
- 8 September – Harry Secombe, entertainer (died 2001)
- 11 September
  - Christopher Freeman, economist (died 2010)
  - Edwin Richfield, actor and screenwriter (died 1990)
- 15 September
  - Richard Gordon, author (died 2017)
  - Clive Rose, diplomat (died 2019)
- 16 September – Peter Russell, poet, translator and critic (died 2003)
- 18 September – Sydney Cohen, South African-born pathologist (died 2017)
- 19 September – Conway Berners-Lee, mathematician and computer scientist (died 2019)
- 20 September
  - Leon Comber, author (died 2023)
  - Horace Gould, racing driver (died 1968)
- 21 September – Jimmy Young, singer and radio broadcaster (died 2016)
- 22 September – Charles Simeons, politician and pollution control consultant (died 2014)
- 25 September – Alf Patrick, footballer (died 2021)
- 27 September – Dennis Nineham, theologian and academic (died 2016)
- 29 September
  - James Cross, Irish-English diplomat (died 2021)
  - Edward Norfolk, priest (died 2017)
  - Albie Roles, footballer (died 2012)
  - Francis Rose, botanist (died 2006)
- 30 September – Deborah Kerr, actress (died 2007)
- 2 October
  - Edmund Crispin, writer and composer (died 1978)
  - Robert Runcie, Archbishop of Canterbury (died 2000)
- 6 October – Val Biro, children's author, artist and illustrator (died 2014)
- 7 October
  - John Gere, art historian and curator (died 1995)
  - Michael Hoban, teacher (died 2003)
- 8 October
  - Michael Fox, judge (died 2007)
  - Robert Scholey, business executive (died 2014)
- 10 October – Neil Carmichael, politician (died 2001)
- 11 October – Paddy Ridsdale, Lady Ridsdale, politician and World War II agent (died 2009)
- 12 October
  - Kenneth Griffith, actor (died 2006)
  - Logie Bruce Lockhart, Scottish rugby player and journalist (died 2020)
- 15 October
  - Alan Smith, footballer (died 2019)
  - Geoffrey Russell, 4th Baron Ampthill, peer and businessman (died 2011)
- 21 October
  - Malcolm Arnold, composter (died 2006)
  - Herbert Gutfreund, Austrian-born biochemist (died 2021)
  - John Wilton, diplomat (died 2011)
- 22 October
  - Charles Ede, publisher (died 2002)
  - David Williams, admiral and governor (died 2012)
- 23 October – Archie Lamb, diplomat, writer and businessman (died 2021)
- 28 October – Stan Palk, footballer (died 2009)
- 2 November
  - Pearl Carr, singer (died 2020)
  - Sally Gilmour, ballerina (died 2004)
- 3 November – Sam Peffer, commercial artist (died 2014)
- 4 November – Hugh Cunningham, army officer (died 2019)
- 6 November – Eric Day, footballer (died 2012)
- 7 November – Vivienne Harris, businesswoman and newspaper publisher (died 2011)
- 10 November – Ernie Gregory, footballer (died 2012)
- 11 November – Ron Greenwood, footballer and manager (died 2006)
- 16 November – Paul Beeson, cinematographer (died 2001)
- 17 November – James Beament, scientist (died 2005)
- 22 November – Brian Cleeve, writer (died 2003)
- 25 November – Johnny Johnson, Royal Air Force officer (died 2022)
- 26 November – Mary Gillham, naturalist (died 2013)
- 27 November – James Kinnier Wilson, assyriologist (died 2022)
- 3 December
  - Arthur Clarke, sports shooter (died 2014)
  - Geoffrey Kirk, classical scholar (died 2003)
- 8 December
  - Horace Barlow, neuroscientist (died 2020)
  - Bill Elsey, racehorse trainer (died 2019)
  - Terence Morgan, actor (died 2005)
- 9 December – Terence Weil, cellist (died 1995)
- 11 December – Liz Smith, character actress (died 2016)
- 12 December – John Papworth, clergyman, writer and activist (died 2020)
- 14 December – Simon Towneley, politician (died 2022)
- 16 December – Alan Thornhill, artist and sculptor (died 2020)
- 18 December – Jack Crompton, footballer (died 2013)
- 19 December – Wilf Proudfoot, politician, businessman and hypnotist (died 2013)
- 21 December
  - Peter Croker, footballer (died 2011)
  - William Reid, RAF pilot (died 2001)
- 22 December – John Aiken, air marshal (died 2005)
- 23 December – Harry Moule, cricketer (died 2016)
- 24 December – Jimmy Clitheroe, comedian (died 1973)
- 25 December – Joseph Pease, 3rd Baron Gainford, aristocrat (died 2013)
- 27 December
  - Gordon Brunton, businessman (died 2017)
  - Cyril Roger, speedway racer (died 2015)

== Deaths ==
- 1 January – Mary Macarthur, trade unionist (born 1880)
- 12 January – Gervase Elwes, tenor (born 1866)
- 18 January – Elizabeth Anne Finn, writer (born 1825 in Poland)
- 26 January – Lord Herbert Vane-Tempest, company director, killed in Abermule train collision (born 1862)
- 8 February – George Formby Sr, entertainer (born 1876)
- 27 February – Schofield Haigh, cricketer (born 1871)
- 22 March – E. W. Hornung, author (born 1866)
- 27 March – Sir Harry Barron, army officer and Governor of Tasmania (1909–1913) and Western Australia (1913–1917) (born 1847)
- 1 April – Sir Edmund Poë, admiral (born 1849)
- 2 April – Charles Blackader, general (born 1869)
- 27 April – Arthur Mold, cricketer (born 1863)
- 12 May – Sir Melville Macnaghten, police officer (born 1853)
- 19 May – Michael Llewelyn Davies, inspiration for Peter Pan, drowned (born 1900)
- 25 May – Sir Arthur Wilson, admiral of the fleet (born 1842)
- 26 June – Alfred Percy Sinnett, theosophist (born 1840)
- 29 June – Lady Randolph Churchill, socialite mother of Winston Churchill (born 1854 in the United States)
- 12 July – Harry Hawker, pioneer of aviation, aircraft accident (born 1889 in Australia)
- 13 July – Emily Davies, pioneer of women's rights and education (born 1830)
- 12 August – Rosalind Howard, Countess of Carlisle, "The Radical Countess", campaigner (born 1845)
- 2 September – Henry Austin Dobson, poet (born 1840)
- 7 September – Alfred William Rich, watercolourist (born 1856)
- 9 September – William Campbell, missionary in Taiwan (born 1841)
- 11 September – Louis Mountbatten, 1st Marquess of Milford Haven, naval officer (born 1854)
- 17 October – Edward John Bevan, chemist, partner of Charles Frederick Cross (born 1856)
- 18 October– Peter Graham, artist (born 1836)
- 23 October – John Boyd Dunlop, inventor (born 1840)
- 10 December – George Ashlin, architect (born 1837)
- 11 December – Hardinge Giffard, 1st Earl of Halsbury, lawyer, Lord Chancellor (born 1823)
- 25 December – Sir George Atkinson-Willes, Royal Navy admiral (born 1847)

== See also ==
- List of British films of 1921
- 1921 in Northern Ireland
- The Troubles in Ulster (1920–1922)
