= GWR 3521 Class =

Class of British 0-4-2T, 0-4-4T and 4-4-0 locomotives

GWR 3521 class
Type and origin
- Power type: Steam
- Designer: William Dean
- Builder: GWR Swindon Works
- Order number: Lots 73, 76
- Serial number: 1095–1114, 1117–1136
- Build date: 1887–1889
Specifications
- Configuration
  - Whyte: Lot 73: 0-4-2T; Lot 76: 0-4-2ST; Loco 3560: 0-4-4T
- Gauge: Lot 73: 4 ft 8 1/2 in (1,435 mm); Lot 76: 7 ft 1/4 in (2,140 mm)
- Driver dia.: 5 ft 0 in (1.524 m)
- Trailing dia.: 4 ft 0 in (1.219 m)
- Wheelbase: 16 ft 6 in (5.03 m)
- Cylinder size: 17 in × 24 in (430 mm × 610 mm) dia × Stroke
Career
- Operators: Great Western Railway
- Numbers: 3521–3540, 3541–3560

The 3521 Class were forty tank locomotives designed by William Dean to haul passenger trains on the Great Western Railway. They were introduced as 0-4-2T locomotives in 1887, but were quickly altered to become 0-4-4Ts to improve their running. Following two serious accidents they were further altered from 1899 to run as 4-4-0 tender locomotives, in which form the last was withdrawn in 1934.

== Locomotives ==
=== 0-4-2T standard gauge ===
The first twenty locomotives were turned out in 1887 as 0-4-2T locomotives for services on the 4 ft 8 1/2 in (1,435 mm) standard gauge lines.

- 3521
- 3522
- 3523
- 3524
- 3525
- 3526
- 3527
- 3528
- 3529
- 3530
- 3531
- 3532
- 3533
- 3534
- 3535
- 3536
- 3537
- 3538
- 3539
- 3540

=== 0-4-2ST broad gauge ===
In 1888 a further batch of twenty were ordered as 0-4-2STs for the 7 ft 1/4 in (2,140 mm) broad gauge lines in Devon and Cornwall.

- 3541 (1888 - 1890)
- 3542 (1888 - 1891)
- 3543 (1888 - 1891)
- 3544 (1888 - 1890)
- 3545 (1888 - 1891)
- 3546 (1888 - 1890)
- 3547 (1888 - 1891)
- 3548 (1888 - 1891)
- 3549 (1888 - 1891)
- 3550 (1888 - 1890)
- 3551 (1888 - 1890)
- 3552 (1888 - 1890)
- 3553 (1888 - 1890)
- 3554 (1889 - 1891)
- 3555 (1889 - 1890)
- 3556 (1889 - 1890)
- 3557 (1889 - 1891)
- 3558 (1889 - 1890)
- 3559 (1889 - 1890)

=== 0-4-4T broad gauge ===
3521 Class
Type and origin
- Power type: Steam
Specifications
- Configuration
  - Whyte: 0-4-4T
- Driver dia.: 5 ft 0 in (1.524 m)
- Trailing dia.: 3 ft 6 in (1.067 m)
- Wheelbase: 21 ft 4 in (6.50 m)
- Only changes are shown

Due to the unsteady running of the 0-4-2STs, the last of the order, 3560, was turned out in August 1889 as a 0-4-4T bogie side tank. The remainder of the class were altered to a similar layout over the following two years. 3560 was slightly different at this time, having a bogie that was six inches (152 mm) shorter and an overall wheelbase of 20 ft 4 in (6.20 m), rather than the 21 ft 4 in (6.50 m) of the converted locomotives.

- 3541 (1890 - 1892)
- 3542 (1891 - 1892)
- 3544 (1890 - 1892)
- 3545 (1891 - 1892)
- 3546 (1890 - 1892)
- 3548 (1891 - 1892)
- 3549 (1891 - 1892)
- 3550 (1890 - 1892)
- 3551 (1890 - 1892)
- 3552 (1890 - 1892)
- 3553 (1890 - 1892)
- 3554 (1891 - 1892)
- 3555 (1890 - 1892)
- 3556 (1890 - 1892)
- 3557 (1891 - 1892)
- 3558 (1890 - 1892)
- 3559 (1890 - 1892)
- 3560 (1889 - 1892)

=== 0-4-4T standard gauge ===
3521 Class
Type and origin
- Power type: Steam
- Designer: William Dean
- Builder: Great Western Railway
Specifications
- Configuration
  - Whyte: 0-4-4T
- Gauge: 4 ft 8 1/2 in (1,435 mm) standard gauge
- Driver dia.: 5 ft 0 in (1.524 m)
- Trailing dia.: 3 ft 6 in (1.067 m)
- Wheelbase: 21 ft 4 in (6.50 m)
- Boiler: GWR 2301
- Cylinder size: 17 in × 24 in (430 mm × 610 mm) dia × Stroke
Career
- Operators: Great Western Railway
- Class: 3521 Class

The standard gauge 0-4-2Ts were converted to 0-4-4Ts in the same manner as the broad gauge locomotives, which were all eventually converted to standard gauge. By the end of 1892 the whole class of forty locomotives was to one standard design for the first time.

- 3521
- 3522
- 3523
- 3524
- 3525
- 3526
- 3527
- 3528
- 3529
- 3530
- 3531
- 3532
- 3533
- 3534
- 3535
- 3536
- 3537
- 3538
- 3539
- 3540
- 3541 (1892 - )
- 3542 (1892 - )
- 3543 (1891 - )
- 3544 (1892 - )
- 3545 (1892 - )
- 3546 (1892 - )
- 3547 (1891 - )
- 3548 (1892 - )
- 3549 (1892 - )
- 3550 (1892 - )
- 3551 (1892 - )
- 3552 (1892 - )
- 3553 (1892 - )
- 3554 (1892 - )
- 3555 (1892 - )
- 3556 (1892 - )
- 3557 (1892 - )
- 3558 (1892 - )
- 3559 (1892 - )
- 3560 (1892 - 1899)

=== 4-4-0 standard gauge ===
All forty 0-4-4T locomotives were rebuilt as 4-4-0 tender locomotives between 1899 and 1902. Twenty-six locos retained their parallel domed boilers while fourteen received new Standard No 3 parallel domeless boilers (later replaced by the taper barrel version of that type). (Holcroft states that twenty-six received Standard No 3 boilers.)

Holcroft was of the opinion that the original inside and outside frames were modified whereas Le Fleming was of the opinion that new inside frames would have been required. However, as the modification also increased the coupled wheelbase from 7 ft 4 in (2.24 m) to 8 ft 6 in (2.59 m), it is unlikely that much of the original framing was re-used.

Two locomotives, 3521 and 3546, were sold to the Cambrian Railways in August 1921 to replace locomotives destroyed in the Abermule accident. They were allocated Cambrian numbers 82 and 95 respectively but these were never carried, the two locomotives being returned to the Great Western Railway with their original numbers when the two railways were amalgamated at the start of 1922.

== Accidents and incidents ==
- On 13 April 1895, locomotives 3536 and 3537, hauling the Cornishman, exceeded the speed limit by 24 miles per hour (39 km/h), damaging the track. A passenger train hauled by 3521 and 3548 consequently derailed between Doublebois and Bodmin Road, Cornwall.
- In 1898, locomotive 3542 derailed near Penryn, Cornwall whilst hauling a mail train. The locomotive rolled down an embankment, killing the driver. The accident was caused by a combination of the condition of the track and the locomotive oscillating. Following this the whole class was rebuilt as 4-4-0 tender locomotives.
