= Lord Herbert Vane-Tempest =

British company director

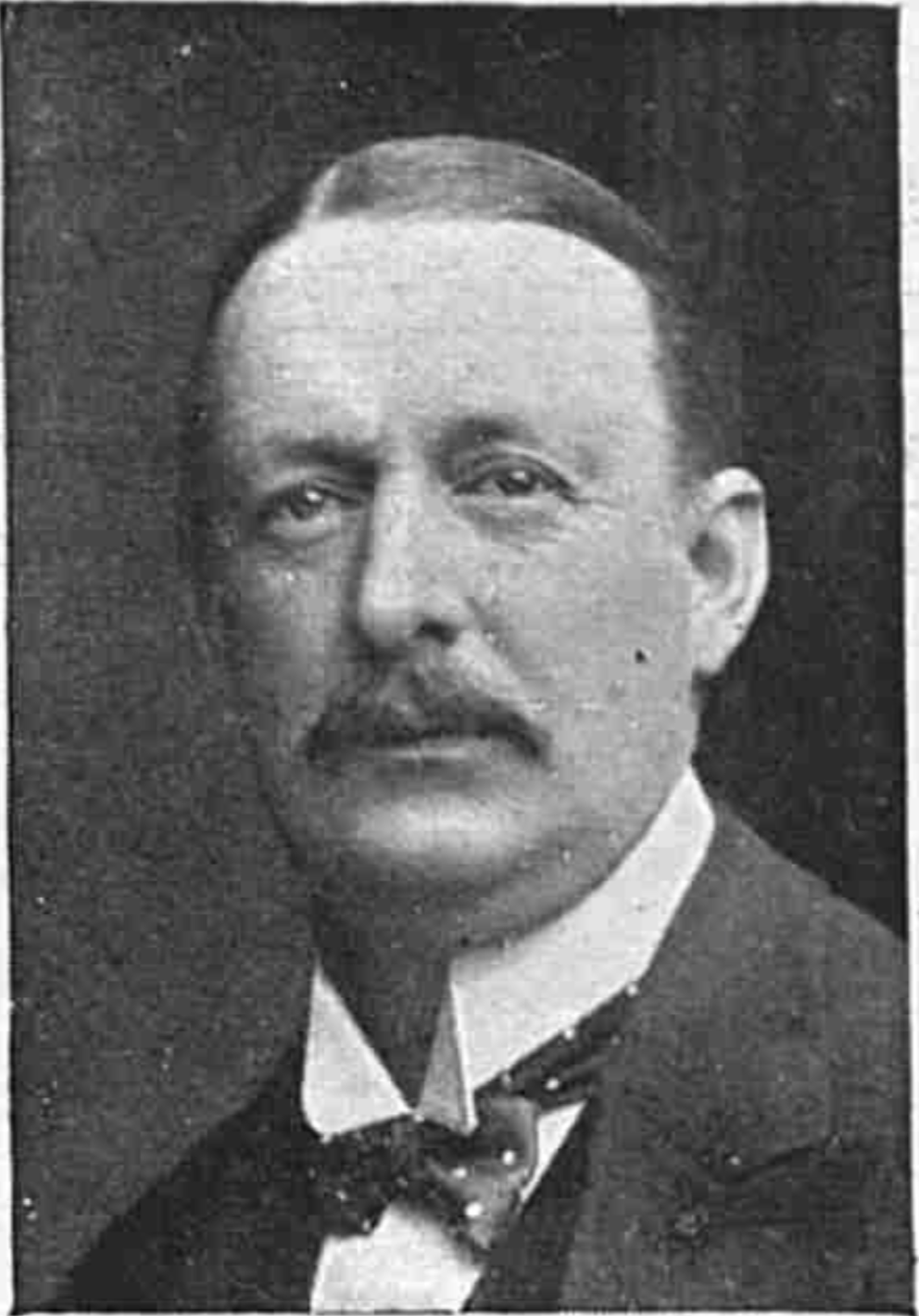
Portrait of Lord Herbert Vane-Tempest

Lord Herbert Lionel Henry Vane-Tempest KCVO VD (6 July 1862 – 26 January 1921) was a British company director. He was a director of the Cambrian Railways and died in the Abermule train collision in January 1921.

== Life ==
Lord Herbert was born into, on his father's side, an aristocratic family of partial Ulster-Scots descent, being the son of the 5th Marquess of Londonderry and his wife, Mary Cornelia Edwards, and brother of the 6th Marquess of Londonderry. He was born on 6 July 1862.

Lord Herbert was a Justice of the Peace of both Montgomeryshire and Merionethshire. He was awarded the Volunteer Officers' Decoration and was appointed Knight Commander, Royal Victorian Order. He was a Major and Honorary Lieutenant-Colonel in the Durham Artillery Militia.

In 1905, Lord Herbert became a director of the Cambrian Railways. The following year, he inherited Plas Machynlleth and a considerable fortune from his mother, Mary. In 1910, Lord Herbert was appointed the High Sheriff of Montgomeryshire. Also in 1910, he became a director of a new company set up to revive the moribund Mawddwy Railway.

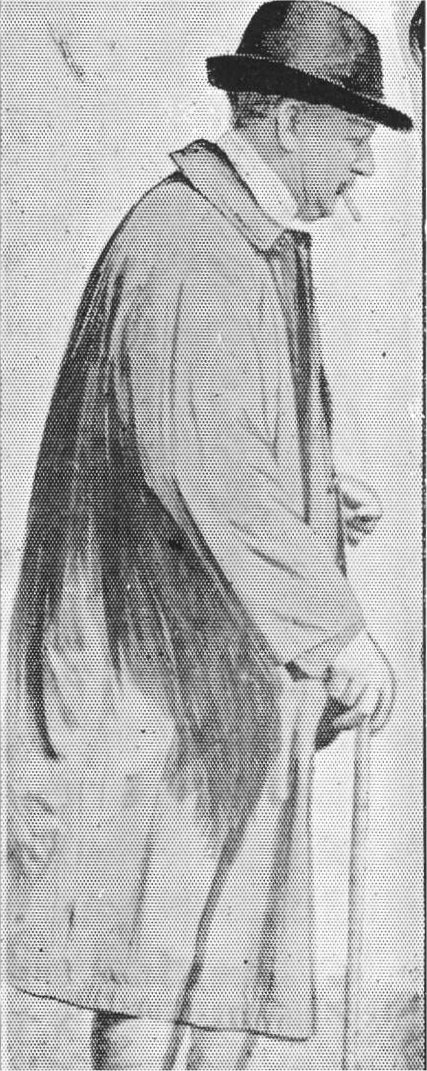
Lord Herbert Vane-Tempest

== Death ==
On Wednesday, 26 January 1921, Lord Herbert joined the east-bound express train from Aberystwyth at Machynlleth. Just before noon, the train was approaching Abermule where it was due to cross the west-bound stopping train from Whitchurch, Shropshire. Due to a failure by the staff at Abermule, the train from Whitchurch was allowed to proceed westward while the express train was approaching the station. The two trains collided west of Abermule station. Seventeen people were killed, including Lord Herbert, aged 58. He was buried in Machynlleth on Saturday, 29 January.

Winston Churchill was Lord Herbert's first cousin once removed and inherited several thousand pounds from a trust set up by Lord Herbert's grandmother (Churchill's great-grandmother), Frances Vane, Marchioness of Londonderry, to aid her male descendants who were not due to inherit the family titles, as Lord Herbert died a bachelor. Churchill was able to put this inheritance towards the purchase of Chartwell.

== Posthumous impersonation by fraudster ==
In 1940, a man was buried as 'Lord Herbert Lionel Henry Vane-Tempest-Stewart', claiming the same birth date as the deceased actual Lord Herbert and adding the 'Stewart' adopted in 1885 by Lord Herbert's brother, the 6th Marquess of Londonderry. This man, who had arrived in Australia in 1886, was previously known as Arthur and John Holmes, and subsequently adopted the names Cumberlege Ware and Bernard Ware Cumberlege. He was a criminal with various convictions for fraud, theft, forgery, and drunkenness, was bankrupt, and had been imprisoned multiple times. He was using the name 'Bernard Vane Tempest' (and noted to be 'alias Holmes, alias Cumberlege') as early as 1890, he having been the previous year sentenced to 12 months of hard labour for the offence of 'false pretenses'. Newspaper reports of his 1889 sentencing for issuing a 'valueless cheque' for £10, which he claimed was done under the influence of morphine and alcohol, stated 'Lord Bernard Vane Tempest' claimed to be 'son of an Irish peer' and was otherwise referred to as 'a connection of the Londonderry family'.

The man latterly succeeded in his identity fraud to some extent, with an obituary published in the Rockhampton, Queensland newspaper The Evening News, in New South Wales's The West Wyalong Advocate, and The Lachlander and Condobolin and Western Districts Recorder, in which he was said to have been settled at Queensland and in New South Wales from the 1890s until his death, and his activities, including gold and sapphire mining, and marriage to a Mary Heal(e)y in 1893, entirely contradict the well-recorded established career and official positions in England of the real Lord Herbert Vane-Tempest. His gravestone was marked with 'Londonderry' and the coat of arms of the Marquess of Londonderry. The impersonator's descendants- he having four sons and three daughters- continued in his false use of the Vane-Tempest-Stewart name. They too had previously used the name 'Cumberlege Ware'.
