= Aubrey Richards =

Welsh actor (1920–2000)

- In Gideon's Way, 1964
- Born: John Aubrey Richards; 6 June 1920; Swansea, Glamorgan, Wales, UK
- Died: 29 May 2000 (aged 79); Barnet, London, England, UK
- Occupation: Actor
- Years active: 1949-1994
- Known for: The Tomb of the Cybermen; The Ipcress File; The Man Who Haunted Himself
- Spouse: Diana Boddington
- Children: 2

Aubrey Richards (6 June 1920 – 29 May 2000) was a Welsh actor who appeared in numerous film and television productions over a 40-year period, often portraying professors.

== Career ==
Richards began his acting career in repertory theatre. His films included The Ipcress File (1965), It! (1967), The Man Who Haunted Himself (1970), Under Milk Wood (1971), Endless Night and Savage Messiah (both 1972). On television he had a major role as Samuel Evans in Carrie's War (1974), and recurring roles in How Green Was My Valley (1975–76), as Mr. Elias, and in Emergency-Ward 10. He also featured as Professor Parry in the Doctor Who adventure The Tomb of the Cybermen (1967).

== Personal life ==
Richards was married to the distinguished stage manager Diana Boddington and they had two children.

== Filmography ==
Year	Title	Role	Notes
1949	The Last Days of Dolwyn	Ellis	
1957	Time Without Pity	Prison Gatekeeper	
1965	The Ipcress File	Dr. Radcliffe	
1967	It!	Prof. Weal	
1970	The Man Who Haunted Himself	Research Scientist	
1971	Under Milk Wood	Rev. Eli Jenkins	
1972	Savage Messiah	Mayor	
1972	Endless Night	Dr. George Philpott	
1989	Twice Under		Uncredited
