= Cambrian Railways 4-4-0 locomotives =

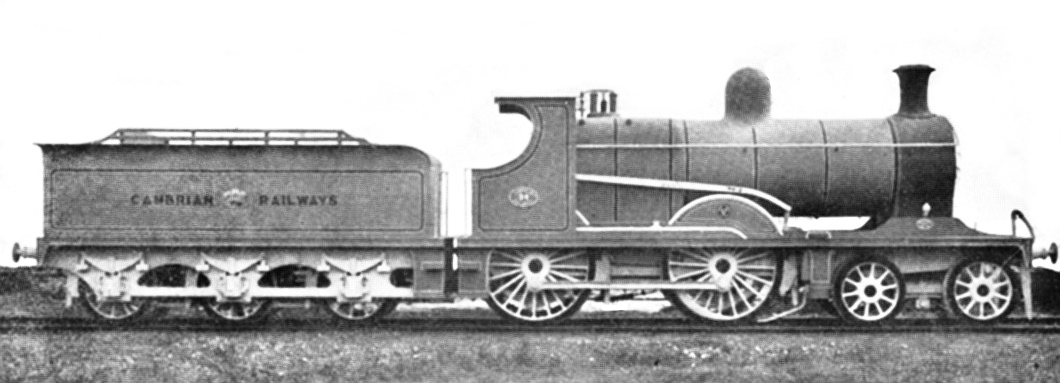
Works photo of no.94 (Large Belpaire Passenger class), c.1921.

The Cambrian Railways 4-4-0 locomotives consisted of five tender locomotive classes introduced between 1878 and 1921. Three of them were designed for the Cambrian Railways and supplied new, the fourth class was rebuilt from 4-4-0 tank locomotives, and the fifth consisted of secondhand purchases. Altogether 37 4-4-0 locomotives were owned by the Cambrian at one time or another, of which 35 passed to the Great Western Railway (GWR) at the start of 1922. The last was withdrawn in 1933.

In addition there was a class of six 4-4-0 tank locomotives introduced in 1905, four of which were not rebuilt as tender locomotives. They all passed to the GWR, and the last were withdrawn in 1923.

None of these locomotives were preserved, but another locomotive from the same class as the six 4-4-0 tank locomotives was preserved.

== Small Bogie Passenger class, or 16 class ==
This class comprised six locomotives, built in pairs by Sharp, Stewart and Company between 1878 and 1891. The first two were named: no. 16 Beaconsfield and no. 17 Hartington; the names were removed by the end of 1891. The others – nos. 20, 21, 50, 60 – were unnamed.

Principal dimensions were: coupled wheels 5 ft 6 1/2 in (1.689 m); cylinders (2 inside) 17 in × 24 in (430 mm × 610 mm); boiler pressure 140 lbf/in^{2} (970 kPa); total heating surface 1,041 ft^{2} (96.7 m^{2}); maximum axle load 11.1 long tons (12.4 short tons; 11.3 t); locomotive weight 33.15 long tons (37.13 short tons; 33.68 t). New boilers were fitted between 1910 and 1915, and by 1922 nos. 50 and 60 (the last two to be reboilered) worked at a pressure of 150 lbf/in^{2} (1,000 kPa).

The Railways Act 1921 caused the Cambrian Railways and several other Welsh railways to amalgamate with the GWR on 1 January 1922, creating an enlarged Great Western Railway. Consequently, the locomotive fleets of these railways were amalgamated with that of the GWR; new numbers were allocated, using blank numbers in the existing GWR list. Accordingly, all six of the Cambrian 16 class passed to the GWR, and were allotted numbers 1110/2/5–8; five of these were duly renumbered, but Cambrian no. 20 was withdrawn in 1922 before its new number (1117) could be applied. The rest were withdrawn between 1924 and 1930. The GWR issued Diagram A34, with power classification "Ungrouped", and weight restriction "Uncoloured".

== Large Bogie Passenger class, or 61 class ==
This class comprised 22 locomotives: sixteen built by Sharp Stewart between 1893 and 1895; four by Robert Stephenson and Company in 1897–98; and two built in the Cambrian workshops at Oswestry, in 1901 and 1904. These two were the only locomotives built new at Oswestry. Numbers were 11, 19, 32, 47, 61–72 and 81–86.

They were larger than the 16 class; the principal dimensions were: coupled wheels 6 ft 0 in (1.83 m); cylinders (2 inside) 18 in × 24 in (460 mm × 610 mm); boiler pressure 150 lbf/in^{2} (1,000 kPa); total heating surface 1,156.5 ft^{2} (107.44 m^{2}); maximum axle load 15 long tons (17 short tons; 15 t); locomotive weight 40.25 long tons (45.08 short tons; 40.90 t). New boilers were fitted to fourteen locomotives between 1912 and 1921. They were the heaviest locomotives permitted on the Mid-Wales line, but in 1926 the part of this route south of Llanidloes was downgraded to "uncoloured" (a maximum axle load of 14 long tons (16 short tons; 14 t)), debarring the 61 class.

One of the class, no. 82, was involved in the Abermule train collision on 26 January 1921. The locomotive was so badly damaged that it had to be cut up on site with oxy-acetylene torches. Only the boiler was salvaged, and put to stationary use at Oswestry. The remaining 21 locomotives passed to the GWR, and were allotted numbers 1068/82/4–6/8/90/1/3/6/7, 1100–9; sixteen of these were duly renumbered, but five (Cambrian nos. 65/8, 70/2, 81) were withdrawn in 1922 before their new numbers (1084/96, 1101/3/5) could be applied. The rest were withdrawn between 1923 and 1931; of these, no. 1106 was renumbered for a second time in 1926, becoming no. 1110 so that a block of numbers could be cleared for the new GWR 1101 Class. The GWR issued Diagram A32, with power classification "Ungrouped", and weight restriction "Yellow".

== Large Belpaire Passenger class, or 94 class ==
This class comprised five locomotives built by Robert Stephenson in 1904. Their numbers were 94–98.

They were larger than the 61 class, and their Belpaire fireboxes gave a significant increase in heating surface. The principal dimensions were: coupled wheels 6 ft 0 in (1.83 m); cylinders (2 inside) 18 1/2 in × 26 in (470 mm × 660 mm); boiler pressure 170 lbf/in^{2} (1,170 kPa); total heating surface 1,283 ft^{2} (119.2 m^{2}); maximum axle load 15.3 long tons (17.1 short tons; 15.5 t); locomotive weight 45.25 long tons (50.68 short tons; 45.98 t). New boilers were fitted to two locomotives in 1920 and 1921. Because of their weight, they were restricted to the line between Whitchurch and Aberystwyth, but from 1915 they were also permitted between Dovey Junction and Pwllheli.

No. 95 was involved in the Abermule train collision, and like no. 82, the locomotive was so badly damaged that it had to be cut up on site. Only the boiler and tender were salvaged, and whilst the tender was reused, the boiler was cut up in 1922. The remaining four locomotives passed to the GWR, and were renumbered 1014/29/35/43. No. 1043 was superheated in 1926, the heating surface being increased to 1,313.5 ft^{2} (122.03 m^{2}) and the pressure raised to 180 lbf/in^{2} (1,240 kPa). They were withdrawn between 1928 and 1933. The GWR issued Diagram A31, with power classification "A", and weight restriction "Yellow".

== Metropolitan A Class rebuilds ==
Between 1864 and 1885, Beyer, Peacock and Company built 66 4-4-0T locomotives in several batches for the Metropolitan Railway. These comprised the Metropolitan A and B classes, and they became redundant in the early 20th century by electrification of the Metropolitan's system from January 1905. Many of them were then put up for sale.

In November 1905, the Cambrian bought six of these locomotives: five of them (Metropolitan 10–13, 15) were A Class and from the original batch of 1864, whilst the sixth (Metropolitan 66) was a B Class locomotive from the last batch of 1885. The Cambrian numbered them 2, 12, 33, 34, 36, 37 and intended to use them on branch lines, but they proved to be too heavy. They were then tried on banking work on the main line eastwards from Machynlleth up to Talerddig (on which the gradient became as steep as 1 in 52 (19.23 ‰ or 1.923%) approaching the summit), but the fuel and water capacities were not sufficient. Confined to yard shunting and to local passenger work on the main line, the Cambrian decided to convert one of them to a 4-4-0 tender engine. No. 34 was sent to Beyer Peacock in 1915, and was returned later that year to work on the Mid-Wales line. Since it was successful on these duties, no. 36 was also converted at Oswestry Works in 1916, but the other four remained as tank locomotives.

Principal dimensions of the tank locomotives were: coupled wheels 5 ft 10 in (1.78 m); cylinders (2 outside) 17 1/2 in × 24 in (444 mm × 610 mm); boiler pressure 150 lbf/in^{2} (1,030 kPa); total heating surface 942.6 ft^{2} (87.57 m^{2}); maximum axle load 16.75 long tons (18.76 short tons; 17.02 t); locomotive weight 44.45 long tons (49.78 short tons; 45.16 t). Changed dimensions of the two rebuilt as tender locomotives were: cylinders (2 outside) 17 1/4 in × 24 in (438 mm × 610 mm); maximum axle load 14.55 long tons (16.30 short tons; 14.78 t); locomotive weight 39 long tons (44 short tons; 40 t).

All six passed to the GWR, and were allotted nos. 1113–4 (tender) and 1129–32 (tank), but only one (Cambrian 12, GWR 1130) was actually renumbered. They were withdrawn in 1922–23. Although all were scrapped and none preserved, one locomotive of the same class (Metropolitan no. 23) which had remained in service with the Metropolitan and its successor, London Transport until 1948 did get preserved upon its final withdrawal. The GWR issued three Diagrams: the tender engines were Diagram A33; Cambrian no. 37 was Diagram F; and the remainder were Diagram E. The power classification was "Ungrouped" for all six, and the weight restriction was "Blue" for the tank engines, and "Ungrouped" for the tender engines.

== GWR 3521 class ==
The last 4-4-0s acquired by the Cambrian were two of the GWR 3521 Class, purchased secondhand from the Great Western Railway in August 1921. They were bought to replace the two engines lost at Abermule earlier that year, and were allotted the same numbers, 82 and 95, but these were never carried – they retained their GWR numbers, 3521 and 3546. A few months later, they returned to GWR stock along with the whole of the Cambrian fleet when the Cambrian Railways amalgamated with the GWR on 1 January 1922. They were withdrawn in 1927 and 1931.

GWR no. 3521 had been built as a standard-gauge 0-4-2T in 1887, and no. 3546 as a broad-gauge 0-4-2ST in 1888. They had each gone through several stages of rebuilding, becoming standard-gauge 4-4-0 tender locomotives in 1899 and 1900 respectively. They were each reboilered at least twice after that, and were superheated in 1920 and 1915 respectively – they were the only superheated locomotives ever owned by the Cambrian Railways. In this form, they were to GWR Diagram A13, with power classification "A", and weight restriction "Yellow".

Unlike the four previous designs, which all had plate frames inside the wheels, these used double frames. In addition to inside plate frames for locomotive and bogie, there were also outside frames: the bogie outside frames were plate, whilst the locomotive outside frames were of sandwich construction – two thin plates separated by wooden blocks. The principal dimensions were: coupled wheels 5 ft 2 in (1.57 m); cylinders (2 inside) 17 in × 24 in (430 mm × 610 mm); boiler pressure 180 or 200 lbf/in^{2} (1,240 or 1,380 kPa); total evaporative heating surface 1,091.15 ft^{2} (101.371 m^{2}); superheater area 97.34 ft^{2} (9.043 m^{2}); maximum axle load 14.8 long tons (16.6 short tons; 15.0 t); locomotive weight 41.8 long tons (46.8 short tons; 42.5 t).

After the Grouping, the GWR allocated further locomotives of this class to former Cambrian locomotive depots – for example, at the time of their withdrawal, no. 3545 was at Machynlleth (as were 3521 and 3546), and nos. 3542/4/54 were at Aberystwyth. Withdrawal of these occurred between 1926 and 1931. Some were also allocated to Oswestry but were subsequently transferred elsewhere.
