= Black Friday (1921) =

Event in British labour history

Black Friday, in British labour history, refers to 15 April 1921, when the leaders of transport and rail unions announced a decision not to call for strike action in support of the miners. The epithet 'black' derives from a widespread feeling amongst labour radicals that the decision amounted to a breach of solidarity and a betrayal of the miners.

Black Friday caused the 1921 United Kingdom census, which had been planned for 24 April, to be pushed back to June.

== Triple Alliance ==
In the 1890s and the first two decades of the 20th century, increasing efforts were made to bring about amalgamations of small, local trade unions and to forge links between different organisations, with a view to securing united action. The National Transport Workers' Federation was created in 1910 to co-ordinate the actions of trade unions representing dockers, seamen, tramwaymen and others and in 1912 the National Union of Railwaymen was created as an amalgamation of a large number of local and sectional organisations representing rail workers. In 1914, the rail and transport unions came together with the Miners' Federation of Great Britain to form the Triple Alliance. Although the agreements did not constitute a binding agreement, the formation of the alliance was recognised as a vehicle for united action by the largest and most powerful industrial groups.

== Mining crisis, March 1921 ==
In the aftermath of the First World War, the Triple Alliance and united action in general were regarded by many trade unionists as a defence against the threat of wage reductions occasioned by the onset of economic depression. A complicating factor was that both the coal industry and railways had been controlled by the state during the war and were not immediately returned to private hands. The Coalition-Liberal Government of David Lloyd George was unwilling to impose wage reductions, as this would provoke strike action against the government, with political implications. Reductions for miners were postponed until the industry was de-controlled on 31 March 1921. Miners who refused to accept the reductions were locked out of employment.

== Decision ==
Following the imposition of the reductions, it was widely expected that the transport and rail unions would strike in support of the miners. However, on 15 April, the executives of the NTWF and NUR announced that they would not recommend strike action. One reason cited by the union leaders was that the miners' representatives had made comments suggesting that they, themselves, were not prepared to strike against the reductions. More broadly, transport and rail union leaders accused the MFGB of expecting support from other unions but refusing to involve those unions in negotiations over the dispute. The principal seamen's union, the National Sailors' and Firemen's Union held a ballot which resulted in the proposal for strike action being defeated by 59 votes.

== Aftermath ==
Despite the decision against fully-fledged strike action, transport and railworkers were ordered not to handle imported coal. Some workers were unhappy with this limited action. In Glasgow, for example, the Scottish Union of Dock Labourers broke with the policy of the Transport Workers' Federation and called its members out on strike on 7 May. On the same day, wage reductions were imposed on merchant seamen, leading to a well-supported general strike at the docks which lasted for over a month. Transport and rail leaders were widely criticised for their actions, with J. H. Thomas of the NUR and Robert Williams of the NTWF being singled out for particular criticism. For their part, union leaders pointed to the difficulties of resisting the wage reductions in a period which had a lot of unemployment, alleged that there was little support for sympathy action amongst rank-and-file dockers and railwaymen and argued that the involvement of other workers would only lead to needless sacrifices on their part. Williams was expelled from the Communist Party following this.

In 1925, when the government agreed to grant a temporary subsidy to the mining industry so as to avoid wage reductions, the day on which the decision was announced became known as Red Friday, in imitation of Black Friday.
