= The Wyalong Star and Temora and Barmedman Advertiser =

Former newspaper in New South Wales, Australia

The Wyalong Star and Temora and Barmedman Advertiser was an English language newspaper published in Wyalong, New South Wales, Australia.

Front page of The Wyalong Star and Temora and Barmedman Advertiser, 3 August 1894

== History ==
The Wyalong Star and Temora and Barmedman Advertiser was first published on 30 March 1894 under the partnership of James Joseph Crowley and Michael Joseph Canty. Crowley and Canty were formerly the publishers of the Temora "Advocate" which was one of the first newspapers on the expanding gold fields of New South Wales. T. A. Crowe was the first editor of The Wyalong Star and Temora and Barmedman Advertiser. He left the paper around 1906 and became the first clerk of the Bland Shire Council. From there he took up dairy farming also trying his hand at running an orchard and held several prominent public office positions sitting on the first Hospital Committee and the first School of Arts Committee. After Crowe left the paper, editorial duties were managed for several years by John Crowley, brother of proprietor James Crowley.

In the early 1920s T. A. Crowe returned to the newspaper this time buying into the enterprise and forming a partnership with M. J. Lynch. He later bought out Lynch and became the sole proprietor of the newspaper. Crowe sold the newspaper to John William Parker in 1928 and The Wyalong Star was formally incorporated into The Wyalong Advocate on 3 August 1928.

== Digitisation ==
The Wyalong Star and Temora and Barmedman Advertiser has been digitised as part of the Australian Newspapers Digitisation Program of the National Library of Australia.

== See also ==
- List of newspapers in New South Wales
- List of newspapers in Australia
