= Alan Townsend =

English cricketer

Personal information
- Full name: Alan Townsend
- Born: 26 August 1921; Stockton-on-Tees, Co. Durham, England
- Died: 27 January 2014 (aged 92); Solihull, Warwickshire, England
- Batting: Right-handed
- Bowling: Right-arm medium, right-arm off-spin

Domestic team information
- Years: Team
- 1948–1960: Warwickshire

Career statistics
Competition	FC
Matches	342
Runs scored	12,054
Batting average	24.95
100s/50s	6/59
Top score	154
Balls bowled	21,486
Wickets	325
Bowling average	28.84
5 wickets in innings	7
10 wickets in match	1
Best bowling	7/84
Catches/stumpings	412/0
- Source: Cricket Archive, 20 June 2014

Alan Townsend (26 August 1921 – 27 January 2014) was an English cricketer who played for Warwickshire from 1948 to 1960.

Townsend was a constant member of the Warwickshire team for 13 seasons, batting in the middle order, bowling medium pace and off-spin, and fielding in the slips. His most successful season with the bat and in the field was 1953, when in 30 matches he scored 1227 runs at an average of 29.92 and took 46 catches. Of his performances that year Wisden remarked that he "at last justified expectations with the bat and he brought exciting moments to many games by his extraordinary catches in the slips".

His highest score was 154 in the first match of the 1957 County Championship, made in just under five hours, against Worcestershire. His best innings bowling figures were 7 for 84 against Essex in 1949, a match that Essex nevertheless won by an innings. His best match bowling figures were 10 for 95 (6 for 67 and 4 for 28) against Cambridge University in 1957.

Townsend was awarded a benefit match in 1960, but he retired later that year after a season of moderate form.
