= John Christoforou =

British painter (1921–2014)

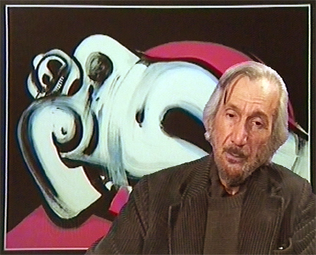
John Christoforou

John Christoforou (10 March 1921 – February 2014) was a British painter of Greek heritage. He spent his childhood in Greece, but returned to England in 1938. With the outbreak of the war, he joined the Royal Air Force where he flew missions in the Far East.

Christoforou had his first exhibition in 1949. In 1957, he moved to Paris and participated in a show with Enrico Baj, Jorn and Mihailovitch at Galerie Rive Gauche. Galerie Birch (Copenhagen), with whom Christoforou worked for many years, paid tribute to his legacy with a solo exhibition, "Hommage à Christoforou", on 3 May 2014.

Collections include: Tate Gallery, London; Frissiras Museum, Greece; Nottingham City Museums and Galleries; Beaux Art Museum, Toulouse; Beaux Art Museum Nantes; Contemporary Art Society, London; Museum of 20th Century Art, Vienna; Kunst Museum, Randers, Denmark; Kunst Museum Silkeborg, Denmark; Fonds National d'Art Contemporain, Paris.
