= Gretel Beer =

Gretel Beer (born Margaret Weidenfeld; 11 July 1921 – 11 August 2010) was an Austrian-born English author of cooking books and travel reports. She also served as a cookery writer for The Daily Telegraph and Daily Express newspapers.

== Biography ==
Beer was born in Vienna into a Jewish family. She was mostly raised by her aunt Olga Springer (Bechin, Bohemia 1879–1942 Maly Trostenets extermination camp) the widow of a physician (in 1937: 9th district, Porzellangasse 45), as her mother Regina Weidenfeld née Pisk died when Margaret was six years old and her father, Dionys (Duny) Weidenfeld, did not keep up a household. (At Porzellangasse, until 1938 Eric Pleskow and Ari Rath spent their childhood, as they told the Austrian broadcaster ORF in 2012.) After attending primary school at Marchegg, a small town east of Vienna near the border with Slovakia, she attended a federal Realschule at Vereinsgasse in Vienna's 2nd district, where many Jewish Viennese lived.

In the spring of 1938, after the annexation of Austria by Germany, she and 48 other pupils were forced to leave this school and attend a Jewish class elsewhere in Vienna. At the entrance hall of her school, which is now called Bundesrealgymnasium Vereinsgasse, since 1989 the names of the expelled pupils are displayed on a memorial inscription.

Her father managed to emigrate to England and arranged for her to leave the Third Reich with a Kindertransport arranged by British NGOs. In March 1939 she arrived in Harwich and worked in several professions in England. In 1943 she married Dr Johann (Hans) Beer, son of the lawyer Oskar Beer. Hans had studied law at the Vienna University until 1938 and finished his studies in England. He was later able to work as British lawyer. The couple later lived in an apartment at Gray's Inn in London and in a manor house in Deal, Kent.

She worked in advertising and public relations, and after the war she was successful with her cookery books and her journalistic work, e.g. for the Daily Telegraph and Vogue. She travelled to Austria at least once a year and kept the typical Viennese German useful to describe the secrets of Viennese cuisine. Her husband died in 1981 in their manor house, during a fire which he could not escape in his wheelchair. She died in Deal in 2010.

== Works ==
- Ice Cream Dishes, 1952
- Sandwiches for Parties and Picnics, 1953
- Classic Austrian Cooking, 1954
- Beer, Gretel; Davies, Paula (1977) [1974]. The Diabetic Gourmet. St Albans: Mayflower Books. ISBN 0583125794. OCLC 1193394584. OL 29376390M.
- Austrian Cooking and Baking, 1975
- Austrian Cooking (1st paperback ed.). London: André Deutsch. 1983 [1954]. ISBN 0233976531. OCLC 1285479736. OL 9714994M.
- Exploring Rural Austria. London: Helm. 1990. ISBN 0747002215. OCLC 1244723380. OL 3673112W.
- Eating Out in Austria, 1992
- A Little Hungarian Cookbook. Illustrated by Des Fox. Belfast: Appletree Books. 1993. ISBN 086281362X. OCLC 1310737344. OL 3673113W.
- The QE2 Cook Book. London: André Deutsch. 1999. ISBN 0233994904. OCLC 1194926205. OL 3673114W.
- Austria
- The Sunday Express Cookbook
- Wieden (Polish for Vienna), by Fred Mawer, Gretel Beer, Deirdre Coffey, Rosemary Bircz, Caroline Bugler; Hachette Polska, Warsaw, 2009
