= Dudley Kernick =

English footballer (1921–2019)

Personal information
- Full name: Dudley Henry John Kernick
- Date of birth: 24 August 1921
- Place of birth: Camelford, England
- Date of death: 15 December 2019 (aged 98)
- Place of death: England
- Position: Forward

Senior career*
Years	Team	Apps	(Gls)
1939–????	Torquay United	38	(7)
1948–1948	Northampton Town	0	(0)
1948–????	Birmingham City	0	(0)
1949–1950	Shrewsbury Town	0	(0)
1950–????	Kettering Town	0	(0)
- Brierley Hill
1953–1955	Nuneaton Borough	0	(0)
1955–????	Hinckley Athletic	0	(0)
- * Club domestic league appearances and goals

Dudley Henry John Kernick (24 August 1921 – 15 December 2019) was an English professional footballer who played as a forward. He played in the English football league for Torquay United, Northampton Town and Birmingham City.

Kernick later retired to Florida, but moved back to Nuneaton in his final years. He died on 15 December 2019, at the age of 98.
