= Kenneth Shearwood =

English cricketer (1921–2018)

Ken Shearwood
Personal information
- Full name: Kenneth Arthur Shearwood
- Born: 5 September 1921; Derby, England
- Died: 5 July 2018 (aged 96)
- Batting: Right-handed
- Role: Wicket-keeper

Domestic team information
- Years: Team
- 1949–1951: Oxford University
- 1949: Derbyshire
- FC debut: 30 April 1949 Oxford Univ. v Gloucestershire
- Last FC: 2 June 1951 Oxford Univ. v Free Foresters

Career statistics
Competition	First-class
Matches	5
Runs scored	45
Batting average	9.00
100s/50s	0/0
Top score	28
Catches/stumpings	5/5
- Source: CricketArchive, January 2012

Kenneth Arthur Shearwood (5 September 1921 – 5 July 2018) was an English cricketer who played first-class cricket for Oxford University between 1949 and 1951 and for Derbyshire in 1949.

Shearwood was born in Derby and was educated at Shrewsbury School before going to Brasenose College, Oxford. He played minor counties cricket for Cornwall in 1947 and for Derbyshire second XI in 1948. He made five appearances as wicketkeeper for Oxford University between 1949 and 1951 when he made 5 catches and 4 stumpings. He played one match as wicketkeeper for Derbyshire in the 1949 season against Gloucestershire when he stumped one batsman. As a right-handed batsman he played 6 innings in 5 first-class matches at an average of 9 with a top score of 28.

Shearwood was also an amateur footballer and represented Oxford University. He played in the Pegasus side which won the FA Amateur Cup at Wembley Stadium in 1951 and 1953.

After retiring from the game, Shearwood spent the rest of his working life at Lancing College. He was appointed a schoolmaster in 1952, teaching English, History and Mathematics, as well as coaching both cricket and football. Additionally, he was housemaster of Sanderson’s House from 1958 to 1975, and went on to become the Head Master’s Deputy from 1982-1986. During this time, he spent a 10 year period as President of the Common Room. After his retirement from teaching in 1986, Shearwood then undertook the role of Registrar – the first to be appointed as such – until he fully retired in 1996. He was an honorary Fellow of Lancing College, and maintained close links with the school in the capacity of Patron of the 1848 Legacy Society (which exists to thank those who have made provision for the College in their Will).

Shearwood published four books: Whistle the Wind in 1959 (illustrated by Alex J Ingram); Evening Star:The Story of a Cornish Fishing Lugger in 1972; Pegasus in 1975, and the autobiography Hardly a Scholar in 1999 (first edition) and 2009 (second edition). He died in July 2018 at the age of 96.
