= Harry Hookway =

First Chief Executive of the British Library

Sir Harry Thurston Hookway

Chief Executive of the British Library
- In office 1973–1984

Personal details
- Born: 23 July 1921 London, England
- Died: 25 June 2014 (aged 92)
- Education: Trinity School of John Whitgift
- Alma mater: Battersea College of Technology (now the University of Surrey)
- Occupation: Civil servant

Sir Harry Thurston Hookway (23 July 1921 – 25 June 2014) was a chief executive and civil servant. He was the first Chief Executive of the British Library, serving from 1973 to 1984. He was born in London in 1921, and attended the Trinity School of John Whitgift in Croydon. His academic studies culminated in the award of a PhD in Chemistry from Battersea College of Technology (now the University of Surrey), after which he worked as a scientific attaché to the British Embassy in Washington, reporting on the technological revolution in the USA that was causing the ‘brain drain’ of British scientists to organisations such as NASA. In Washington he forged a partnership with the National Endowment for the Humanities to take forward the English Short Title Catalogue covering the 18th century. He foresaw the digital revolution and made plans for the catalogue to be digitised.

Though not a librarian himself, he worked closely with members of the profession during his time at the British Library, and served as President of the Institute of Information Scientists from 1973 to 1976.
