= Charlie Kelsall =

Welsh footballer (1921–2019)

Personal information
- Date of birth: 15 April 1921
- Place of birth: Hawarden, Flintshire, Wales
- Date of death: 20 April 2019 (aged 98)
- Place of death: Hawarden, Flintshire, Wales
- Position: Left-back

Youth career
- ????–1938: Mynydd Isa Wanderers

Senior career*
Years	Team	Apps	(Gls)
1938–1939	Buckley Town		
1939–1952	Wrexham	39	(0)
1952–1954	Holywell Town		
1954–1955	Buckley Rovers		
- * Club domestic league appearances and goals

Charles Kelsall (15 April 1921 – 20 April 2019) was a Welsh professional footballer who played as a left-back. He made appearances in the English Football League for Wrexham, and also played for Welsh teams Buckley and Holywell Town. Kelsall died on 20 April 2019 at the age of 98.
