= John Cavanagh (neurobiologist) =

British neurobiologist (1921–2019)

John Barr Cavanagh (5 May 1921 – 15 October 2019) was professor of applied neurobiology at the Institute of Neurology in London. He was a founder member of the British Neuropathological Society who award a prize in his memory. A collection of papers relating to his investigations into Minamata disease are held by the Wellcome Library.

== Selected publications ==
- The Brain in Unclassified Mental Retardation. Churchill Livingstone, London, 1972. (Editor) ISBN 0443009163
