= Elizabeth Innes =

Scottish haemotologist

Elizabeth "Elma" Innes FRCPE
- Born: Elizabeth Marion Innes; 10 April 1921; Ardrossan, Scotland
- Died: 10 April 2015 (aged 94)
- Education: University of Edinburgh
- Occupations: physician, academic
- Medical career
- Sub-specialties: paediatric haematology

Elizabeth Marion Innes (10 April 1921 – 10 April 2015) was a Scottish paediatric haematologist.

== Early life and education ==
Elizabeth Marion Innes (nickname, "Elma") was born in Adrossan, 10 April 1921. She grew up in Burntisland, Scotland.

Innes attended The Mary Erskine's School in Edinburgh, commuting by train each day from her home in Fife. She studied for her medical degree at the University of Edinburgh in 1943 and was the most distinguished woman graduate in her year.

== Career and research ==
As a junior doctor, she treated soldiers returning from the World War II at Gogarburn Emergency medical services hospital, going on to later specialise in paediatrics and community child health. In 1962, she established the paediatric haematology unit in Edinburgh's Royal Hospital for Sick Children, and was unpaid for the first two years of this work. Innes became a Member of the Royal College of Physicians of Edinburgh in 1946, and a Fellow in 1966.

Innes spent a year working as a haematology research fellow in St Louis, United states in the late 1940s. She participated in multi-centre trials of chemotherapy and radiotherapy for children with leukaemia, and became a member of the Medical Research Council's working party on childhood leukaemia in 1969. Innes was appointed as a senior lecturer at the University of Edinburgh in 1976.

== Personal life ==
She married her husband, James, in 1946 who had told her that he would only marry her if she passed the Royal College of Physicians examinations. Together the couple had two daughters and a son. After retiring in 1981, she enjoyed travelling with James, particularly to Barra, and spending time with her family, gardening, reading and playing piano. Innes was widowed in 2009, after 63 years of marriage. She died on her 94th birthday, on 10 April 2015.
