= The Lachlander =

The Lachlander and Condobolin and Western Districts Recorder was a weekly, later bi-weekly, English language newspaper published in Condobolin, New South Wales, Australia beginning around 1895 and continuing until 1952. It absorbed The Condobolin Argus and Lachlan Advertiser and was continued by The Lachlander.

Front page of The Lachlander and Condobolin Western Districts Recorder, 6 January 1899

== Newspaper history ==
The Lachlander and Condobolin and Western Districts Recorder began publication in approximately 1895. It absorbed The Condobolin Argus and Lachlan Advertiser (1892–1900). In 1952 it was continued by The Lachlander, a current publication.

== Digitisation ==
The Lachlander and Condobolin and Western Districts Recorder has been digitised as part of the Australian Newspapers Digitisation Program of the National Library of Australia.

== See also ==
- List of newspapers in Australia
- List of newspapers in New South Wales
