= Ronald Grierson =

British businessman and army officer (1921–2014)

Sir Ronald Grierson
- Born: Rolf Hans Griessmann; 6 August 1921; Nuremberg, Germany
- Died: 23 October 2014 (aged 93)
- Occupations: Banker, businessman, government advisor, and British Army officer

Sir Ronald Hugh Grierson (6 August 1921 – 23 October 2014) was a German-born British banker, businessman, government advisor, and British Army officer. After service in the Black Watch, attached to the Special Air Service and mentioned in despatches, during the Second World War, he became a lieutenant colonel in the post-war SAS. He was managing director of the investment bank S.G. Warburg from 1948 to 1985, and vice-chairman of General Electric Company plc, an industrial conglomerate, from 1968 to 1996. From 1972 to 1974, he was Director-General for Industry at the European Commission.

== Early life ==
Grierson was born Rolf Hans Griessmann in Nuremberg, Germany, on 6 August 1921, the son of Ernest Griessmann. After early schooling in Nuremberg and Paris, he was educated at Highgate School from 1935 to 1939 and at Balliol College, Oxford.
