= The West Wyalong Advocate =

Newspaper in New South Wales, Australia

The West Wyalong Advocate is a weekly, English language newspaper published in West Wyalong, New South Wales, Australia. It has previously been titled The Wyalong Advocate and Mining, Agricultural and Pastoral Gazette.

== History ==
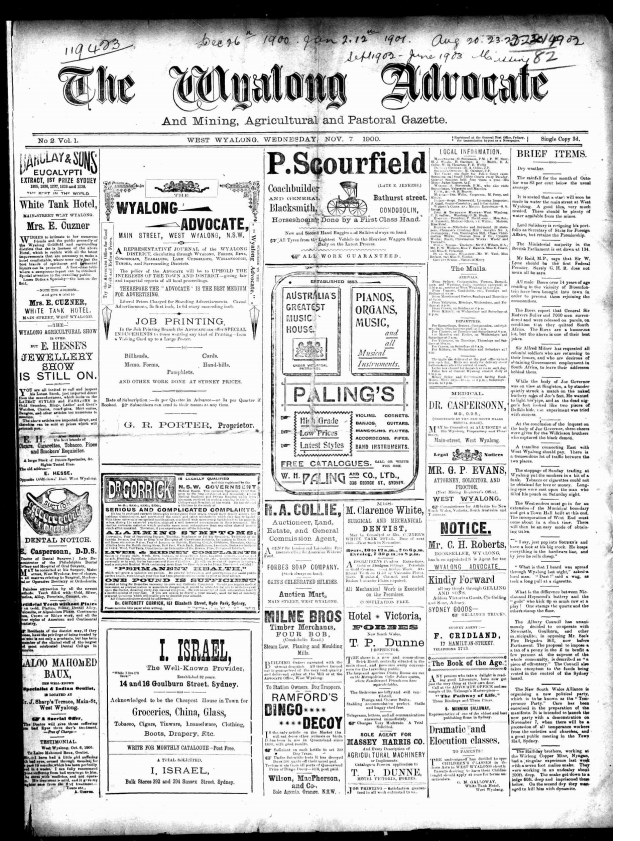
The West Wyalong Advocate and Mining, Agricultural and Pastoral Gazette, 7 November 1900

The paper began in 1900 as The Wyalong Advocate and Mining, Agricultural and Pastoral Gazette was published by George R. Porter. This publication ceased in February 1928 and became The West Wyalong Advocate which it remains today. It also absorbed The Wyalong Star and Temora and Barmedman Advertiser at this time.

In more recent times, drought and economic downturn during the COVID-19 pandemic resulted in the paper changing from bi-weekly to weekly production. In 2020 the paper was offered for sale when the Bradley family of nearby Temora but a buyer was not found. In a front page story The West Wyalong Advocate announced its final issue would be published on 23 December 2020 and the paper would close. Evolution Mining, which has a gold operation at nearby Lake Cowal, consulted with owners, community stakeholders and Bland Shire Council to find a way to revive the paper while retaining its independence. This resulted in the formation of the West Wyalong Advocate Foundation, a not-for-profit organisation with an independent board of directors and many of the original staff. After a four-month hiatus, The West Wyalong Advocate was again published in May 2021.

== Digitisation ==
Issues of the paper from March 1928 to December 1954 have been digitised as part of the Australian Newspapers Digitisation Program project hosted by the National Library of Australia.

== Owners and editors ==
The West Wyalong Advocate was independently owned from 1986 to December 2020 by the Bradley family, who also owned The Temora Independent. From 2022 it was printed and published by Heatherbelle Vearing for The West Wyalong Advocate Foundation.

Editors of The West Wyalong Advocate have included Ron Cooper, Garry Shaw, Terence Cunningham and Heatherbelle Vearing. The current Managing Editor is Tony Bosworth, previously editor of the Barrier Truth (Broken Hill) and founding editor of Hawkesbury Post. The West Wyalong Advocate is a member of the Country Press Association.

== See also ==
- List of newspapers in New South Wales
- List of newspapers in Australia

== Bibliography ==
- Country conscience : a history of the New South Wales provincial press, 1841-1995 / by Rod Kirkpatrick, Canberra City, A.C.T. : Infinite Harvest Publishing, 2000
- Looking good : the changing appearance of Australian newspapers / by Victor Isaacs, for the Australian Newspapers History Group, Middle Park, Qld. : Australian Newspaper History Group, 2007.
- Press timeline : Select chronology of significant Australian press events to 2011 / Compiled by Rod Kirkpatrick for the Australian Newspaper History Group
- Australian Newspaper History : A Bibliography / Compiled by Victor Isaacs, Rod Kirkpatrick and John Russell, Middle Park, Qld. : Australian Newspaper History Group, 2004.
- Newspapers in Australian libraries : a union list. 4th ed.
