= Charles Jacob (stockbroker) =

British stockbroker and ethical investing pioneer

Charles Jacob

Charles William Jacob CBE (24 January 1921 – 1 June 2015) was a British stockbroker in the City of London who was a pioneer and promoter of ethical investment.

Jacob was born into poverty in Hornsey, north London, and became a Methodist at a young age. After working his way up from office boy, he became a stockbroker specialising in gilt-edged and fixed-interest stocks. In 1972 he was asked to manage the Methodist Church's investment fund and his interest in ethical investment developed from there. He became a director of a number of investment companies and was the director and patron of the UK Sustainable Investment & Finance Association.

Jacob was a Methodist preacher. He was made MBE in 1988, and CBE in 2011.
