= Triple Alliance (Trade unionism) =

Alliance of British trade unions

The Triple Alliance was an alliance of British trade unions: the Miners Federation of Great Britain, the National Union of Railwaymen and the National Transport Workers' Federation (an association of dockers, seamen, tramwaymen and road vehicle workers' unions).

== Formation and pre-war activity ==
After a period of intense industrial unrest beginning in July 1910, the Triple Alliance was formed in early 1914 by the Miners Federation of Great Britain, the newly-unified National Union of Railwaymen and the National Transport Workers' Federation. It appeared to signal a significant step towards greater unity and syndicalist ideology within British trade unionism.

The onset of the First World War, however, curtailed any imminent action by the Alliance. In his 1936 book, The Strange Death of Liberal England, George Dangerfield argued that if war had not broken out, there would have been a devastating general strike, coordinated by the Triple Alliance, in October 1914.

== First World War ==
There was a cessation of trade union activity during the war. The industries represented by the Triple Alliance (mining, the railways and other transport systems) were temporarily brought under state control during the war.

== Post-war ==
=== Black Friday ===
The mining industry was privatised on 1 April 1921, and the mine owners immediately threatened wage reductions. The Miners' Federation of Great Britain planned a co-ordinated response with its allies in the Triple Alliance on Friday the 15th.

Following some confusion over what terms the Miners' Union would be prepared to accept, the transport workers' and railwaymen's unions decided not to call their members on strike in sympathy with the miners. That was subsequently remembered as Black Friday by many socialists and trade unionists, who regarded the collapse of the Triple Alliance as a betrayal of solidarity and a major defeat for trade unionism.

=== General strike ===
The Triple Alliance was significant in securing government subsidies for miners' wages on Red Friday in July 1925 by threatening a general strike. The Triple Alliance agreed to back the miners in their dispute against mine owners who had announced future wage cuts and had increased work hours a month previously. That threatened a complete halt to the production and transport of coal.

== Sources ==
- Coates, Ken & Topham, Tony (1994). The Making of the Labour Movement. Nottingham. ISBN 0-85124-565-X.
- Laybourn, Keith (1999). The General Strike. London. ISBN 0-7509-2254-0.
- Lowe, Norman (2009). Mastering Modern British History. Palgrave Macmillan, Beccles.
