= Jack Watson (cricketer) =

English cricketer

Personal information
- Full name: John Martin Watson
- Born: 17 April 1921; High Spen, County Durham, England
- Died: 10 March 2012 (aged 90); Darlington, County Durham, England
- Batting: Left-handed
- Bowling: Right-arm off break

Domestic team information
- Years: Team
- 1956–1966: Durham
- 1949–1955: Northumberland
- 1946–1948: Durham

Career statistics
Competition	List A
Matches	2
Runs scored	2
Batting average	–
100s/50s	–/–
Top score	2*
Balls bowled	78
Wickets	–
Bowling average	–
5 wickets in innings	–
10 wickets in match	–
Best bowling	–
Catches/stumpings	–/–
- Source: Cricinfo, 15 March 2012

John Martin Watson (17 April 1921 – 10 March 2012) was an English cricketer. Watson was a left-handed batsman who bowled right-arm off break. He was born at High Spen, County Durham, and was educated at Blackhall Mill Elementary School.

Watson made his debut for Durham against Northumberland in the 1946 Minor Counties Championship. He played Minor counties cricket for Durham in 1946 and 1947, before joining Northumberland in 1949. He played Minor counties cricket for Northumberland from 1949 to 1955, making 67 Minor Counties Championship appearances for Northumberland. He rejoined Durham for the 1956 season, playing Minor counties cricket for the county until 1972, making a total of 119 Minor Counties Championship appearances, which also included those played in his first spell with Durham. He made his List A debut against Hertfordshire in the 1964 Gillette Cup. In this match he wasn't required to bat or bowl. He made a further List A appearance against Sussex in the following round of the same competition. He bowled 13 wicket-less overs, while with the bat he scored an unbeaten single. Sussex won the match by 200 runs. In his Minor counties career for Durham, he took 394 wickets at an average of 16.63, with best figures of 8/88 against Staffordshire in 1953. An all-rounder, Watson scored 2,816 runs with the bat for Durham, which came at a batting average of 23.08, with a high score of 73. His highest score in Minor counties cricket came for Northumberland, making 102 in 1954.

Before making his cricketing debut, he completed his National Service in the Royal Air Force, and while posted in Canada he met and married his wife, Ruth, in 1944. The couple settled in Ashington, Northumberland, where their son, Ian, was born. Outside of cricket, Watson had worked as a police officer with Northumberland Constabulary and later as the chief fire and security officer at Shildon Wagon Works. He also had a keen interest in football, and had worked as a coach and scout, working with Tony Mowbray at all the clubs he had managed. Watson was once the caretaker manager of Darlington, while his work as a scout had seen him work for Sunderland, Middlesbrough, Hartlepool United, Carlisle, Birmingham City, Sheffield Wednesday, Celtic, and West Brom. He continued to work for Middlesbrough right up until his death. Having become ill at his County Durham home, Watson was taken to the Darlington Memorial Hospital in Darlington, County Durham, where he died following a short illness on 10 March 2012. His funeral was held at Newton Aycliffe, County Durham, on 23 March 2012, and was attended by 300 mourners. At the time of his death he was the oldest surviving Durham cricketer.
