= Diana Boddington =

British stage manager

- Born: 30 July 1921; Blackpool, England
- Died: 17 January 2002 (aged 80); London, England
- Occupation: Stage manager
- Years active: 1941–1987
- Spouse(s): Aubrey Richards; 2 children

Diana Boddington, MBE (30 July 1921 – 17 January 2002) was an English stage manager.

== Career ==
Born in Blackpool in 1921, Boddington's first worked as an assistant electrician for Tyrone Guthrie at the Old Vic in 1941. Later she worked with Orson Welles on his production of Othello in 1951.

Boddington frequently worked with Laurence Olivier. She was stage manager at the Old Vic under Olivier and Sir Ralph Richardson's leadership in the 1940s, moving with Olivier when he ran the St James' Theatre in the 1950s, the Chichester Festival Theatre and later with the National Theatre company in 1963. Boddington formed a strong working relationship with Laurence Olivier. Her lifelong bond with Olivier was essentially one of camaraderie, epitomized by the fact that they had once taken refuge together under a table one rehearsal during the war, when surprised by an air raid. According to Simon Callow something of those days characterised their relationship.

She was dubbed "Marshal Boddington" by the young actors at the National (such as Michael Gambon and Derek Jacobi) during the 1960s, bluffly organising and rallying her troops. She stayed at the National Theatre, until her retirement in 1987. Boddington was the first stage manager to receive the MBE for services to the theatre.

== Family life ==
Boddington married actor Aubrey Richards (6 June 1920 – 29 May 2000). They had two children. Boddington died of a stroke on 17 January 2002, aged 80.
