= Red Friday =

1925 British government agreement with miners

On Friday 31 July 1925 the British government agreed to the demands of the Miners Federation of Great Britain to provide a subsidy to the mining industry to maintain miners' wages. The Daily Herald called this day Red Friday; a union defeat four years earlier had been called "Black Friday". The 1926 General Strike followed nine months later.

== Background ==
There had been a long history of labour unrest in the British coal mining industry. A triple alliance had been formed in 1914 of the Miners Federation, the Transport and General Workers Union and the National Union of Railwaymen, for mutual support in trade disputes, but had been unable to undertake united action due to World War I. In 1916, at the height of World War I, Lloyd George's government had taken control of the industry, but with inflation the purchasing power of miners' wages had fallen.

After the war government control was relaxed, and the triple alliance was revived. In 1919, as a conciliatory measure, the government appointed a royal commission to investigate the industry under Mr Justice Sankey, which recommended the nationalisation of mining royalties but did not explain how this would be achieved. The government, citing the lack of unanimity of the commission, declined to implement its report. The government responded to a strike by the Yorkshire miners in July 1919 by planning measures to maintain the mines during the strike.

In April 1921 the miners went on strike, seeking equalisation of wages between coalfields, but the unity of the triple alliance collapsed, leaving the miners to fight on until hunger drove them back to work on Black Friday, leaving the employers (who had come together in the Mining Association) in control. There was a small concession to the miners of a temporary subsidy of £10M, but their average pay fell by 30% during 1921.

== Red Friday ==
In April 1925 Britain returned to the gold standard. This was effectively a revaluation of sterling, and led to deflation in the British economy over the following years. This made it difficult for the coal owners to export coal profitably in the face of resurgent German exports. On 30 June the Mining Association gave notice to terminate the 1924 wage agreement, after which wages would be cut (with no national minimum) and hours increased. Negotiations took place, but it was soon apparent that, without a subsidy, a strike or lock-out was inevitable. The miners had secured an agreement from the railwaymen that they would not handle coal. This was likely to result in the railway companies sacking those who refused, leading to a railway strike.

The government reviewed emergency arrangements and Prime Minister Baldwin concluded, "We were not ready". In consequence the government backed down, and negotiated a subsidy for the coal industry to last nine months to enable the employers to maintain wages and conditions. This cost £23M. It seems that an emergency plan existed on paper, but would require the recruitment of many volunteers to implement it, and the staff did not exist.

== Reaction ==
The subsidy could only be a temporary measure. The government immediately put in hand measures to be implemented in the event of a general strike, which seemed inevitable when the subsidy ended.
