= Graham Leggett =

Royal Air Force officer

Percival Graham Leggett
- Born: 14 February 1921
- Died: 26 May 2013 (aged 92)
- Allegiance: United Kingdom
- Branch: Royal Air Force
- Service years: 1939–1958
- Rank: Squadron Leader

Percival Graham Leggett (14 February 1921 – 26 May 2013) was a Squadron Leader in the Royal Air Force and was one of the youngest pilots to survive the Battle of Britain during World War II.

Leggett joined the Royal Air Force Volunteer Reserve in June 1939 as an Airman under training Pilot. He was called up for active duty on 1 September 1939 and he completed his training and arrived at No.5 OTU at Aston Down in September 1940. On 18 September he crashed at Oldbury-on-Severn, Gloucestershire but was unhurt.

Leggett was posted to No. 615 Squadron RAF at RAF Prestwick soon afterwards, moving to No. 245 Squadron RAF at RAF Aldergrove on 28 September and then to No. 46 Squadron RAF at RAF Stapleford on 18 October 1940.

He claimed a Fiat BR.20 probably destroyed and shared in the destruction of another on 11 November. Leggett was posted to No. 145 Squadron RAF in late November 1940 and then No. 96 Squadron RAF when it was formed at RAF Cranade on 18 December 1940. In late June 1941 Leggett joined No. 249 Squadron RAF in Malta and he claimed a Macchi C.200 on 17 July. He was shot down by enemy fighters on 21 December 1941, baled out and was admitted to hospital with slight abrasions. He then joined No. 73 Squadron in North Africa in October 1942, until August 1943.

On return to the UK he became Adjutant at RAF Kirton-in-Lindsay, after which he served in Ceylon. In 1949 he became CO of 32 squadron, flying de Havilland Vampires from Cyprus. Graham Leggett retired from the RAF on 23 May 1958 holding the rank of Squadron Leader.

Leggett died peacefully on 26 May 2013 at the age of 92. His funeral, held on 12 June, was attended by Air Vice Marshal Carl Dixon CB, OBE, who was representing the Prince of Wales. RAF Air Chief Marshal Stephen Dalton sent a letter of condolence to Leggett's wife and their family.
