= Tony Sutton (cricketer) =

English cricketer (1921–2019)

Personal information
- Full name: Michael Antony Sutton
- Born: 29 March 1921; Weymouth, Dorset, England
- Died: 28 June 2019 (aged 98)
- Batting: Right-handed
- Bowling: Right-arm off-spin
- Role: Bowler

Domestic team information
- Years: Team
- 1946–1947: Oxford University
- 1948: Somerset
- First-class debut: 22 May 1946 Oxford University v Yorkshire
- Last First-class: 25 June 1948 Somerset v Oxford University

Career statistics
Competition	First-class
Matches	19
Runs scored	144
Batting average	8.00
100s/50s	–/–
Top score	30
Balls bowled	2678
Wickets	47
Bowling average	25.91
5 wickets in innings	1
10 wickets in match	–
Best bowling	5/63
Catches/stumpings	23/–
- Source: CricketArchive, 27 February 2011

Michael Antony Sutton (29 March 1921 – 28 June 2019) played first-class cricket for Oxford University in 1946 and 1947 and also appeared in a single first-class match for Somerset in 1948, playing against Oxford University. He was born at Weymouth, Dorset. CricketArchive lists him as "Tony Sutton" and this is confirmed in a book published in 2018 that includes material from interviews with him.

Sutton was educated at Ampleforth College and at Worcester College, Oxford. In the Second World War, he was part of the Westminster Dragoons involved in the Normandy landings and was awarded a Military Cross and latterly a Legion d'Honneur for his service.

As a cricketer he was a right-handed lower-order batsman and a right-arm off-spin bowler. In the 1946 season, he was the most economical of Oxford's regular bowlers, with 31 wickets at an average of 22.93 runs each. The best bowling figures of his career came in the match against Leicestershire when he took five second innings wickets for 63 runs, his only five-wicket return. He took three wickets in the 1946 University match against Cambridge.

Sutton played for the Oxford University side again in 10 matches in 1947 but his bowling was less effective and the English-born Canadian off-spin bowler Basil Robinson was preferred in the team for the 1947 University match. In 1948 he played his one first-class match for Somerset and in 1954 he played once in the Minor Counties for Devon as well as in two other minor matches.

Sutton's premature obituary appeared in the January 1993 issue of The Cricketer, an erratum notice was published followed by a letter from Sutton laying out some of his other cricketing achievements that did not make his obituary. His death was announced in The Times on 2 July 2019.
