= James Kinnier Wilson =

English assyriologist (1921–2022)

James Vincent Kinnier Wilson (27 November 1921 – 22 December 2022) was a British Assyriologist. He was Eric Yarrow Lecturer, from 1955 until 1989, and Emeritus Fellow, Wolfson College, Cambridge.

== Life and career ==
Kinnier Wilson was born in Marylebone, London on 27 November 1921. The youngest son of the neurologist Samuel Alexander Kinnier Wilson, he combined a skill in reconstructing Mesopotamian legends and epics with an enduring interest in the study of the organic and mental diseases of ancient Mesopotamia.

Kinnier Wilson lived in Cambridge. He last published works in 2016.

The Ancient India and Iran Trust held a 100th birthday celebration for Wilson on 26 November 2021. He died on 22 December 2022, at the age of 101.

== University career ==
- 1946: Admitted to Christ Church, Oxford
- 1949: BA (Oxon), in (Classical) Hebrew and Assyriology. 1952, MA
- 1950: Appointed Lecturer in Assyriology, Durham University
- 1951–52: Research year at The Oriental Institute, University of Chicago
- 1953–55: Lecturer and (one year) Asst. Prof., University College, Toronto
- 1955–89: Appointed Eric Yarrow Lecturer in Assyriology, University of Cambridge
- 1965–67: Chairman, Faculty of Oriental Studies, Cambridge

== Publications ==
- The Nimrud Wine Lists: A study of men and administration at the Assyrian capital in the Eighth Century BC (The British School of Archaeology in Iraq, London, 1972)
- Indo-Sumerian: A new approach to the problems of the Indus Script (Clarendon Press, Oxford, 1974)
- The Rebel Lands: An investigation into the Origins of Early Mesopotamian Mythology (Cambridge University Press, 1979)
- The Legend of Etana: A new edition (Aris and Phillips, Warminster, 1985)
- Studia Etanaica: new texts and discussions, Alter Orient und Altes Testament, Band 338 (Ugarit-Verlag, Münster, 2007)
- James Kinnier Wilson, ed. (2007). The Wisdom and the Beauty: A Selection of Short Passages from the Qur'an. Shepheard-Walwyn. ISBN 978-0-85683-247-5.
- Towards Novaluation: God's Work and Ours at the End of the Age (Janus Publishing Company, 2010)

=== Selected chapters and articles ===
- "An Introduction to Babylonian Psychiatry", The Oriental Institute of the University of Chicago, Assyriological Studies, No. 16, Chicago, pp. 289–298, 1965
- "Organic diseases of Ancient Mesopotamia", and "Mental diseases of Ancient Mesopotamia", in D Brothwell and A T Sandison, eds., Diseases in Antiquity: a Survey of the Diseases, injuries and Surgery of Early Populations, (Charles C. Thomas, Springfield, Illinois), Chaps. 15 and 56, 1967
- "Medicine in the Land and the Times of the Old Testament", in Studies-in the period of David and Solomon and other Essays, ed. Tomo Ishida (Yamakawa-Shuppansha, Tokyo), pp. 339–365, 1982
- "The 'Seven Cities' of the Indus Script: a Restatement", South Asian Studies, 12, pp. 99–104, 1996
- “'On the Ud-shu-bala [Weather change] at Ur towards the End of the Third Millennium BC", Iraq LXVII/2, pp. 47–60, 2005
- "On Stroke and Facial Palsy in Babylonian Texts" (with E. H. Reynolds), in Disease in Babylonia. ed. I.L. Finkel and M.J. Geller (Brill, Leiden), pp. 67–99, 2007

== Media ==
- Narrator in the short film, "The Poor Man of Nippur — World's first film in Babylonian" produced by the University of Cambridge Department of Archaeology (2018)
