= Abermule train collision =

1921 railway incident in Wales

Coordinates: 52.54281°N 3.23662°W

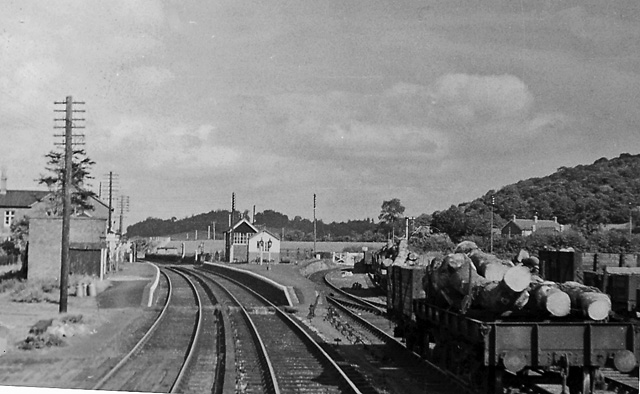
- Abermule station in 1953, looking north-east towards Welshpool. There are few changes since 1921. The station buildings are on the up platform to the left, the signal box on the down platform to the right.

Details
- Date: 26 January 1921; 12:06
- Location: Abermule, Montgomeryshire
- Country: Wales
- Line: Cambrian Line
- Cause: Single-line token error

Statistics
- Trains: 2
- Deaths: 17
- Injured: 36

The Abermule train collision was a head-on collision which occurred at Abermule, Montgomeryshire, Wales, on Wednesday, 26 January 1921, killing 17 people. The crash arose from misunderstandings between staff which effectively over-rode the safe operation of the Electric Train Tablet system protecting the single line. A train departed carrying the wrong tablet for the section it was entering and collided with a train coming the other way.

== Background ==
The Cambrian Railways, which traversed Wales from Whitchurch in Shropshire to Aberystwyth and Barmouth, via Dovey Junction, contained a number of single line sections. The small station of Abermule was a crossing station between two such sections. To the east was Montgomery, to the west was Newtown.

To protect the single line sections, Tyer's Electric Train Tablet apparatus was used. Two linked tablet instruments were used on each section, one at each end. To allow a train to proceed into the section, a call button would be pressed on one instrument, alerting the operator at the other end of the section. If the other operator was able to accept the train, he would then press a release button on his instrument, which allowed a tablet (a metal plate inscribed with the name of the section) to be withdrawn from the caller's instrument. The tablet would then be placed inside a pouch fitted with a metal loop (which allowed it to be easily picked up or handed over by a train crew while in motion) and given to the driver of the train as proof of his authority to occupy the section. Until the tablet was replaced in one of the instruments, another tablet could not be withdrawn from either of them. Tablets of adjacent sections had differently-shaped and -positioned holes and notches in them to prevent a tablet being inserted into wrong instrument.

This system had protected the Cambrian Railways for many years. There was a weakness at Abermule, in that the electric tablet machines and the other block telegraph instruments were kept in the main station buildings, while the signals were worked from a separate signal box at the east end of the station, and some of the points from a ground frame at the other end of the station. Regulations specified that only the stationmaster or signalman were to work the tablet machines, but it was common for both to be occupied with duties away from the station buildings, and it became accepted practice for any member of the station staff to work them.

== Collision ==
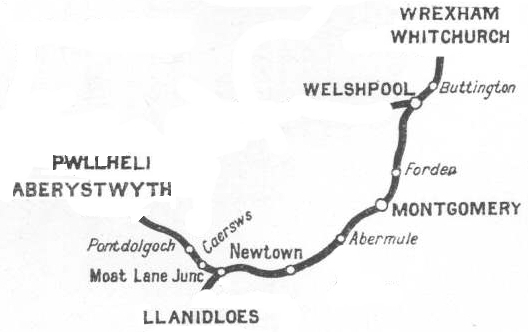
The section of the Cambrian Railways adjacent to Abermule Station, where the accident occurred

Shortly before midday on 26 January 1921, a west-bound stopping train from Whitchurch and an east-bound express from Aberystwyth were approaching Abermule from opposite directions, and were due to cross there. The regular Abermule Stationmaster, Parry, was on leave, and Relief Stationmaster Lewis, who was deputising for him, had gone for his lunch. The other three station staff at Abermule were Signalman Jones, Porter Rogers, who was seventeen, and a trainee booking clerk named Thompson, who was only fifteen years old.

The staff at Montgomery station requested clearance for the stopping train to run to Abermule, and Signalman Jones pressed the release on the tablet instrument for the Montgomery-Abermule section, allowing the train to proceed. He then checked that the express was running to time, and was informed that it had just passed Moat Lane Junction on the far side of Newtown, as scheduled. Jones went to the signal box to open the level crossing gates and clear the signals for the stopping train. Meanwhile, Relief Stationmaster Lewis returned from his lunch. A permanent way sub-inspector attracted his attention with an urgent enquiry, and he immediately went with the sub-inspector to the goods yard, without entering the instrument room or inquiring as to the position of any trains approaching Abermule.

Newtown station then requested permission for the express to proceed to Abermule. Porter Rogers pressed the release on the tablet machine for the Newtown-Abermule section which allowed it to do so. He then went to the ground frame at the west end of the station to set the points for the express, but found the frame locked against him because Jones had already "set the road" for the stopping train to arrive on the down road. While Rogers was occupied at the ground frame, Newtown signalled that the express was entering the Newtown-Abermule section. However, there was no-one in the Abermule station buildings to note the signal.

Before Porter Rogers could call to Signalman Jones to release the ground frame lock, the stopping train arrived. The youth, Thompson, collected the tablet for the Montgomery-Abermule section from the driver of the stopping train, and was heading back to the station buildings to put it in the tablet instrument when he met Lewis returning from the goods yard. He gave the tablet to Lewis, saying that he had to go and collect the tickets (although only one passenger had alighted from the train). He did not mention that he had yet to exchange the tablet for one for the Abermule-Newtown section (which he could not have done, because the Abermule-Newtown tablet machine was still locked). Thompson also mistakenly told Lewis that the express was still "about Moat Lane", presumably from having overheard some of Jones's earlier telephone conversation.

Lewis assumed that because the express had apparently not reached Newtown, the two trains would cross at Newtown rather than Abermule, and he did not look at the tablet closely enough to see that it was the one for the Montgomery-Abermule section that had just been handed over by the driver of the stopping train. He crossed back to the down platform and, because the driver was oiling around the engine, handed the tablet back to the stopping train's fireman, who did not notice the error either. Lewis gave the "Right away" signal by hand. Jones, who was also on the down platform, assumed that the express had been delayed or held at Newtown for some reason. Rogers, who was still at the ground frame, assumed the same, because of Lewis's actions and because the frame was locked, and so he lowered the down advance starting signal. Lewis, Jones and Rogers did not realise the truth until the stopping train had already departed.

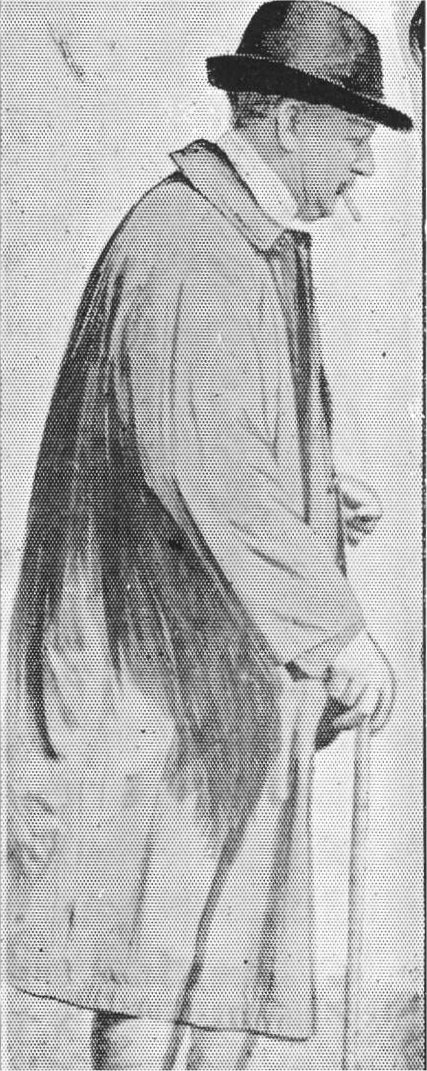
Lord Herbert Vane-Tempest, a director of the Cambrian Railways, killed in the accident.

The express was travelling at about 50 miles per hour (80 km/h) and the crew were about to begin slowing for the arrival at Abermule, when they saw the stopping train heading for them on the same track. Although they immediately braked, they could not stop in time. The crew of the stopping train did not appear to have seen them, because they continued to put on steam. The crew of the express were just able to jump clear in time, although they were both severely injured. Fifteen passengers, including a director of the railway, Lord Herbert Vane-Tempest, and the driver and fireman of the stopping train, were killed in the collision.

After the crash, Driver Pritchard Jones of the express train was desperately concerned that he had made an error, until his fireman, Owen, retrieved both their own correct tablet for the section and the tablet for the Montgomery-Abermule section from the wreckage. The tablets were handed to the Traffic Controller for the Cambrian Railways, who had been travelling on the stopping train, and the Chief Traffic Inspector, who had been a passenger on the express. The Inspector (George) took the Montgomery-Abermule tablet on foot to Abermule station and replaced it in the correct machine in the presence of witnesses, to allow a breakdown train from Oswestry to reach the scene of the crash and assist with freeing the injured.

The engines involved were 4-4-0 passenger locomotives, no. 95 of the 94 Class was hauling the express from Aberystwyth, and no. 82 of the 61 Class was hauling the stopping train from Whitchurch. Both were reduced to wreckage and written off. There was severe telescoping of the passenger carriages, especially in the express train, which caused most of the casualties. This was apparently the result of the collision occurring on a slight curve, causing the buffers to be slightly misaligned, and allowing the fourth carriage of the express to override the buffers of the third.

== Causes and lessons ==
The obvious cause of the Abermule collision was the unauthorised working of the tablet machines by anyone who happened to be around, and the failure of the staff at Abermule to notify each other of their actions. The slack working practices had been allowed to develop over several years by Stationmaster Parry and Signalman Jones.

A contributory cause was the failure of anyone to examine the tablet they received by removing it from its pouch and checking that it was the correct one. Although inspection of the tablet was required in the working rules, it was clearly taken for granted that the tablet was correct, since the system had worked faultlessly for years. Indeed, for anyone to ostentatiously examine a tablet may have been a breach of etiquette, as it would imply that the person handing it over might not be competent or trustworthy. Driver Pritchard Jones and Fireman Owen of the express train were conscientious in inspecting every tablet they received; the crew of the stopping train were not.

Finally, the awkward layout of tablet instruments, signals and points levers at Abermule meant that it was possible for conflicting movements to be made. The inquiry recommended that tablet machines be placed in the signal box under the sole control of the signalman, and also that starting signals (which gave trains authority to leave the station) be interlocked with the tablet instruments, so that they could not be cleared until the correct tablet had been released. However, this would involve the rebuilding of the station buildings and signal boxes at Abermule and several other small stations, and it was suggested that alternate single-line sections use the electric tablet system and the older electric staff system; there would be no possibility of mistaking a staff for a tablet. The signalling method continued in use on the line until 1988, when it was replaced by the Radio Electronic Token Block system.

The obvious, though costly, solution to the problems of working single lines would be to double the tracks. As finances allowed, the Cambrian Railways (and the Great Western Railway, with which the Cambrian amalgamated in January 1922 as a consequence of the Railways Act 1921) had been slowly carrying out the necessary work. British Rail actually removed much of the doubled track and some of the crossing stations as part of the Beeching Axe.

In August 2019, two passenger trains travelling towards each other entered a single track section on the Romney, Hythe and Dymchurch Railway, a light excursion railway in Kent. Although both trains stopped 312 m (1,024 ft) apart before any collision occurred, a subsequent safety investigation cited the Abermule accident as having "clear parallels with the events leading up to the incident at Romney Sands".

== Aftermath ==
Lord Herbert Vane-Tempest was unmarried. Part of his estate went to his first cousin once removed, Winston Churchill. Churchill used this inheritance to purchase his house at Chartwell in Kent.

== See also ==
- 2024 Talerddig train collision 2024 head-on collision on the same line
- List of rail accidents in the United Kingdom
