= Carson (surname) =

Carson is a surname of Scottish origin. It is also common in Northern Ireland, and has spread to other English-speaking countries, including the U.S.

The surname first appeared in Galloway in the 13th century, in the forms Acarsan and Acarson. It may have originated as a Gaelic patronymic, Ua Crosáin, meaning "descendant of Crosán". Alternatively, it may be a habitational name taken from an unidentified place.

The surname may refer to:

== People ==
=== A ===
- Adam Carson (disambiguation), multiple people
- Aglionby Ross Carson (1780–1850), Scottish educationalist
- Al Carson (1882–1962), American baseball player
- Alex Carson (1923–1981), Canadian football player
- Alexander Carson (disambiguation), multiple people
- Alfred Carson (1859–1944), Australian journalist
- Alyssa Carson (born 2001), American astronaut
- André Carson (born 1974), American politician
- Ann Carson (c.1785–1824), American counterfeiter and memoirist
- Ann Elizabeth Carson (1929–2023), Canadian poet
- Anne Carson (born 1950), Canadian poet
- Annette Carson (born 1940), English author
- Anthony Carson (disambiguation), multiple people
- April Carson, American epidemiologist
- Arthur Carson (1895–1985), American missionary

=== B ===
- Barbara Carson (1927–2015), Australian nurse
- Ben Carson (born 1951), American neurosurgeon and politician
- Big Al Carson (1953–2020), American singer
- Bill Carson (disambiguation), multiple people
- Brad Carson (born 1967), American lawyer and politician
- Brett Carson (born 1985), Canadian ice hockey player
- Bruce Carson, Canadian political aide
- Bud Carson (1930–2005), American football player and coach

=== C ===
- Caelen Carson (born 2002), American football player
- Callum Carson (born 1999), Welsh rugby union footballer
- Candy Carson (born 1953), American author
- Carlos Carson (born 1958), American football player
- Carol Carson (born 1945), Canadian politician
- Carol S. Carson, American economic statistician
- Cathryn Carson (born 1968), American historian
- Charles Carson (disambiguation), multiple people
- Chris Carson (born 1994), American football player
- Ciaran Carson (1948–2019), Northern Irish poet and novelist
- Clarence Buford Carson (1925–2003), American historian
- Clarice Carson, (1929–2015), Canadian soprano
- Clayborne Carson (born 1944), American professor
- Clyde Carson (born 1981), American rapper
- Clyde Carson (politician), American politician
- Crystal Carson (born 1967), American actress
- Culley C. Carson III (born 1945), American urologist

=== D ===
- D. A. Carson (born 1946), Canadian author
- Dale Carson (1922–2000), American politician
- Danny Carson (born 1981), English footballer
- Darren Carson, New Zealand curler
- David Carson (disambiguation), multiple people
- Deb Carson, American radio personality
- Delia E. Wilder Carson (1833–1917), American art educator
- Dennis A. Carson, American physician
- Dick Carson (1929–2021), American television director
- Don Carson (rugby union), Canadian rugby union footballer
- Don Carson (wrestler) (1934–2013), American professional wrestler
- Donald Carson (1929–2000), American pianist

=== E ===
- Eden Carson (born 2001), New Zealand cricketer
- Edris Rice-Wray Carson (1904–1990), American doctor
- Edward Carson (1854–1935), Irish unionist politician, barrister and judge
- Ella Stuart Carson (1880–??), American screenwriter
- Ernest Crawford Carson (1894–1952), Canadian politician
- Essence Carson (born 1986), American basketball player
- Everett "Brownie" Carson (born 1947), American politician

=== F ===
- Finlay Carson (born 1967), Scottish politician
- Frances Carson (1895–1973), American actress
- Frank Carson (1926–2012), Irish comedian
- Frank Carson (ice hockey) (1902–1957), Canadian ice hockey player

=== G ===
- Gary Carson (1949–2014), American author
- George Carson (disambiguation), multiple people
- Gerald Carson (1903–1956), Canadian ice hockey player
- Gerald Carson (writer) (1899–1989), American advertising executive
- Gilbert Carson (disambiguation), multiple people
- Gladys Carson (1903–1987), English swimmer
- Glenn Carson (born 1990), American football player
- Glenn Carson (Canadian football) (born 1978), Canadian football player

=== H ===
- Hamish Carson (born 1988), New Zealand runner
- Hampton L. Carson (disambiguation), multiple people
- Harry Carson (born 1953), American football player
- Harry Roberts Carson (1869–1948), American cleric
- Henderson H. Carson (1893–1971), American politician
- Henry Carson (1866–1948), Australian politician
- Howard Carson (disambiguation), multiple people
- Hugh A. Carson (??–1913), American politician
- Hunter Carson (born 1975), American actor

=== I ===
- Irving W. Carson (1838–1862), American army captain

=== J ===
- Jack Carson (disambiguation), multiple people
- Jackie Carson (born 1978), American basketball coach
- Jahii Carson (born 1993), American basketball player
- James Carson (disambiguation), multiple people
- Jan Carson, Northern Irish writer
- Jean Carson (1923–2005), American actress
- Jeannie Carson (born 1928), British comedian
- Jim Carson (1912–??), Scottish footballer
- Jimmy Carson (born 1968), American ice hockey player
- Jeff Carson (1963–2022), American singer
- Jenny Lou Carson (1915–1978), American singer-songwriter
- Jessie Carson, American librarian
- Jo Carson (1946–2011), American playwright
- Joan Carson (born 1935), Northern Irish politician
- JoAnne Carson (born 1953), American artist
- Joanne Carson (model) (1931–2015), American model
- Joe Carson (disambiguation), multiple people
- Joel M. Carson III (born 1971), American judge
- John Carson (disambiguation), multiple people
- Johnnie Carson (born 1943), American diplomat
- Johnny Carson (1925–2005), American comedian
- Johnny Carson (American football) (1930–2009), American football player
- Jon Carson (born 1991), Canadian politician
- Joseph Carson (disambiguation), multiple people
- Josephine Carson (1919–2002), American writer
- Josh Carson (born 1993), Northern Irish footballer
- Julia Carson (1938–2007), American politician

=== K ===
- Karen Carson (born 1943), American artist
- Ken Carson (disambiguation), multiple people
- Kendel Carson (born 1985), Canadian singer
- Kern Carson (1941–2002), American football player
- Kevin Carson, American political theorist
- Kit Carson (disambiguation), multiple people
- Kyle Carson, Canadian football executive

=== L ===
- Lance Carson (1945–2020), American businessman and politician
- Lane Carson (born 1947), American real estate broker
- Lauren H. Carson (born 1954), American politician
- Lee Carson (1921/1922–1973), American journalist
- Leonard K. Carson (1923–1994), American fighter pilot
- Leonardo Carson (born 1977), American football player
- Letitia Carson (1814–1888), American pioneer
- Lindsay Carson (born 1960), Canadian ice hockey player
- Lisa Nicole Carson (born 1969), American actress
- L. M. Kit Carson (1941–2014), American actor
- Lori Carson (born 1958), American singer-songwriter

=== M ===
- Mackenzie Carson (born 1998), Canadian born, English rugby union footballer
- Malcolm Carson (1959–2020), American football player
- Maradan Carson (1788–1843), French-born British milliner and dressmaker
- Margaret Carson (1911–2007), American publicist
- Maria Josefa Jaramillo Carson (1828–1868), American social figure
- Martha Carson (1921–2004), American singer
- Mary Ann Carson, American politician
- Matthew Carson (disambiguation), multiple people
- Michael Carson (disambiguation), multiple people
- Mindy Carson (1927–2025), American vocalist

=== N ===
- Neil Carson (born 1973), Irish cricketer
- Neil Carson (businessman) (born 1957), British businessman

=== P ===
- Patricia Carson (1929–2014), Belgian historian
- Paul Carson (disambiguation), multiple people
- Perry H. Carson (1842–1909), American politician
- Peter Carson (disambiguation), multiple people
- Phil Carson, English record owner
- Presley Carson (1968–2024), Honduran footballer

=== R ===
- Rachel Carson (1907–1964), American biologist and author
- Rae Carson (born 1973), American writer
- Richard Carson (born 1955), American economist
- Richard E. Carson, American researcher
- Robert Carson (disambiguation), multiple people
- Rocky Carson (born 1979), American racquetball player
- Russell Carson (born 1943), American businessman

=== S ===
- Sal Carson (1920–2007), American trumpeter
- Sally Carson, Canadian marine biologist
- Sally Carson (author) (1902–1941), English author
- Samuel Carson (disambiguation), multiple people
- Sandra Carson, American doctor
- Scott Carson (born 1985), English footballer
- Scott Patrick Carson, American microbiologist
- Sharon Carson (born 1957), American politician
- Silas Carson (born 1965), English actor
- Sofia Carson (born 1993), American actress
- Sorrel Carson (1920–2005), Irish actress
- Stafford Carson (born 1951), Northern Irish minister
- Stephen Carson (born 1980), Northern Irish footballer
- Stephen Carson (jockey) (born 1979), English jockey
- Steve Carson (born 1968), Irish television producer
- Stewart Carson (born 1976), South African badminton player
- Sunset Carson (1920–1990), American actor

=== T ===
- Tarik Carson (1946–2014), Uruguayan-Argentine writer and painter
- Terrence C. Carson (born 1958), American actor
- Thomas Carson (disambiguation), multiple people
- Towa Carson (born 1936), Swedish singer
- Tra Carson (born 1992), American football player
- Trevor Carson (born 1988), Northern Irish footballer

=== V ===
- Violet Carson (1898–1983), British actress

=== W ===
- Wallace P. Carson Jr. (born 1934), American attorney
- Wayne Carson (1943–2015), American musician
- William Carson (disambiguation), multiple people
- Willie Carson (disambiguation), multiple people
- Witney Carson (born 1993), American dancer

== Fictional characters ==
- Cave Carson, a character in DC Comics
- Mitchell Carson, a character in Marvel Comics
- Roy Carson, a character from Final Destination 5
- Mr Carson, in the Downton Abbey television series
- At least one character claiming to be named Carson in the Krakatit novel

== See also ==
- Carson (disambiguation), a disambiguation page for Carson
- Carson (given name), people with the given name Carson
- Attorney General Carson (disambiguation), a disambiguation page for attorneys general surnamed Carson
- General Carson (disambiguation), a disambiguation page for generals surnamed Carson
- Senator Carson (disambiguation), a disambiguation page for senators surnamed Carson
