= William Carlson =

William Carlson may refer to:

- William H. Carlson (1864–1937), American land developer and politician
- William S. Carlson (1905–1994), academic administrator and president of four universities
- William E. Carlson (1912–1999), American educator, businessman, and politician
- William F. Carlson (1959–2003), American military veteran and a CIA paramilitary officer
- Bill Carlson (footballer) (1885–1964), Australian rules footballer
- Bill Carlson (1934–2008), American journalist and television anchor
- Billy Carlson (1889–1915), American auto racer
- Billy Carlson (baseball) (born 2006), baseball player
- William Carlson (racewalker), winner of the 1500 m walk at the 1933 USA Indoor Track and Field Championships

== See also ==
- Bill Carson (disambiguation)
- William Carson (disambiguation)
- William Karlsson (ice hockey)
