= Donald Carson =

Donald or Don Carson may refer to:

- D. A. Carson (born 1946), theologian and professor of the New Testament
- Donald "Tee" Carson (died 2000), American jazz pianist
- Don Carson (rugby union), Canadian rugby union player
- Don Carson (wrestler), professional wrestler and wrestling manager
