= The Saddle Boys =

Juvenile adventure book series

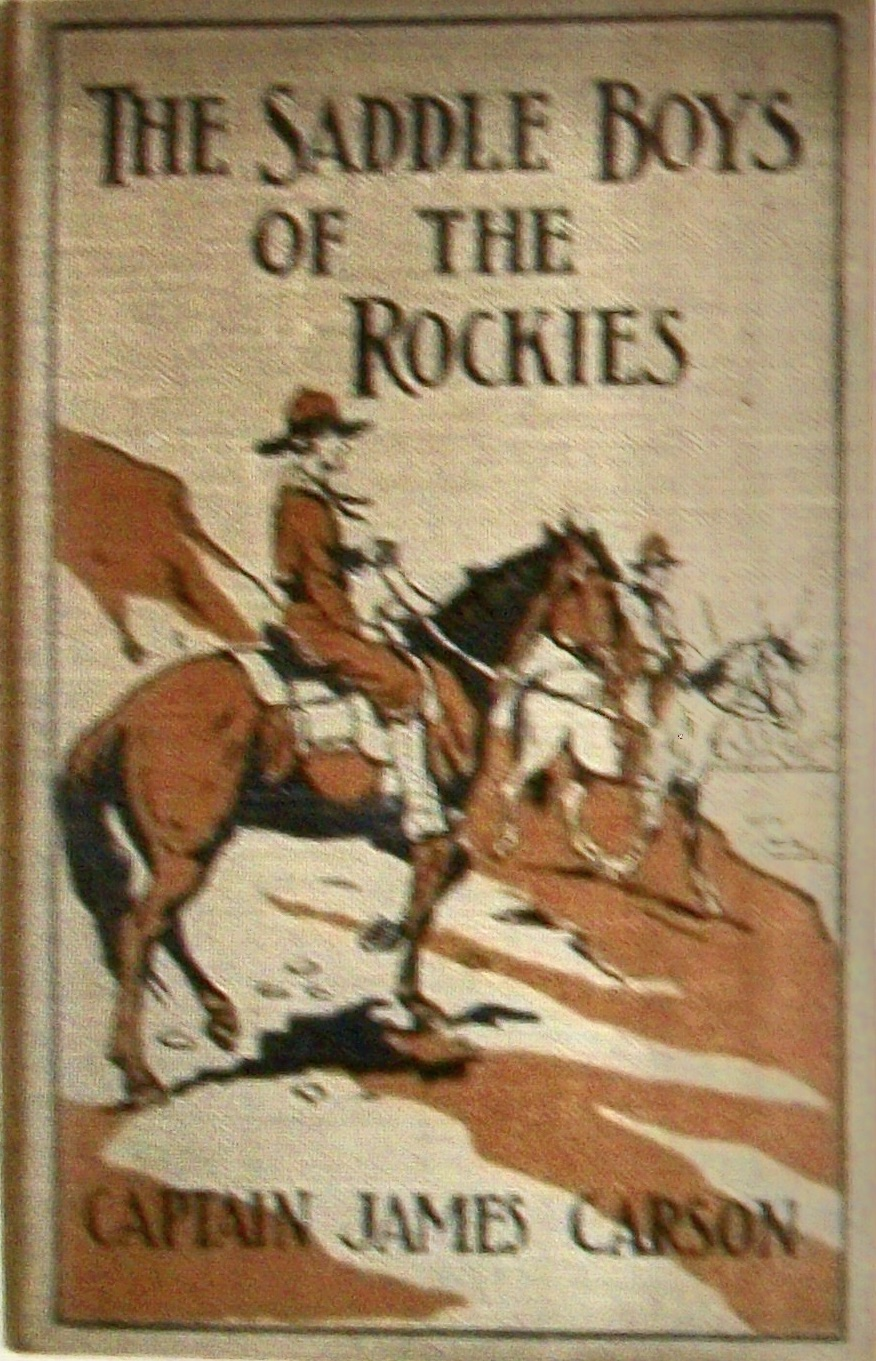
- The Saddle Boys cover
- Author: Captain James Carson (pseudonym)
- Language: English
- Genre: Juvenile adventure
- Publisher: Cupples & Leon
- Publication date: 1913-1915
- Publication place: United States

The Saddle Boys is a Western-themed series of juvenile adventure novels written by Captain James Carson, a pseudonym used by the Stratemeyer Syndicate. Illustrations are by W. S. Rogers. The series was published between 1913 and 1915 by Cupples & Leon. Advertising shows that the series was sold in the United States until at least 1929.

A 1920 advertisement lists the series as being published in Canada by Ryerson Press.

== Main characters and synopsis ==
The Saddle Boys are Frank Haywood, the only son of the rich owner of a ranch and mines, and Bob Archer, who'd been raised in Kentucky.

Cupples & Leon advertised the series by stating: "All lads who love life in the open air and a good steed, will want to peruse these books. Captain Carson knows his subject thoroughly, and his stories are as pleasing as they are healthful and instructive."

== Book titles and publisher's summary ==
When Cupples & Leon advertised this series these are the summaries they used.

1. The Saddle Boys Of The Rockies or, Lost on Thunder Mountain (1913) "Telling how the lads started out to solve the mystery of a great noise in the mountains – how they got lost – and of the things they discovered."
2. The Saddle Boys In The Grand Canyon or, The Hermit of the Cave (1913) "A weird and wonderful story of the Grand Canyon and the Colorado, told in the most absorbing manner. The Saddle Boys are to the front in a manner to please all young readers."
3. The Saddle Boys On The Plains or, After a Treasure of Gold (1913) "In this story the scene is shifted to the Great Plains of the southwest, and then to the Mexican border. There is a stirring struggle for gold, told as only Captain Carson can tell it."
4. The Saddle Boys At Circle Ranch or, In at the Grand Round-up (1913) "Here we have lively times at the ranch, and likewise the particulars of a grand round-up of cattle and encounters with wild animals and also cattle thieves. A story that breathes the very air of the plains."
5. The Saddle Boys On Mexican Trails or, In the Hands of the Enemy (1915) "The scene is shifted in this volume to Mexico. The boys go on an important errand, and are caught between the lines of the Mexican soldiers. They are captured and for a while things look black for them; but all ends happily."

== Series reprints ==
As of 2023 Barnes & Noble lists copies of the series titles being available in paperback, eBook and audiobook editions.
