= James Carson =

James Carson may refer to:

- James H. Carson (1821–1853), Second Sergeant in the US Army in the mid-1850s
- James Harvey Carson (1808–1884), Virginia politician and militia general (Confederate)
- Captain James Carson, pseudonym used by the Stratemeyer Syndicate for the five volume "Saddle Boys" series
- James Carson (American football) (1940–1999), head coach of Jackson State University
- James Carson (physician) (1772–1843), Scottish physician
- Jim Carson (musician) (1934–2008), New Zealand tuba player and military band leader
- James Carson (rugby union) (1870–1903), Australian rugby union player
- James Carson (water polo) (1901–1964), American Olympic water polo player
- James Carson (field hockey) (born 1994), Welsh field hockey player
- James S. Carson (1874–1960), American corporate executive and Spanish–American War veteran
- James H. Carson Jr. (1935–2015), American lawyer
- Jimmy Carson (born 1968), American ice hockey player
