= Paul Carson =

Paul Carson may refer to:

- Paul Carson (actor) (1934–1989), American actor
- Paul Carson (composer), composer of music for The American Scene, the Grove Play of 1942
- Paul Carson (sportscaster) (1950–2010), Canadian sports broadcaster
- Paul Carson, fictional character in "Shadow Play" of The Twilight Zone, 1959
