= William Carson (disambiguation) =

Sir William Carson (1770–1843) was a politician from Newfoundland

William Carson may also refer to:

- William A. Carson (1863–1949), New York statesenator
- William Carson (Virginia) (1774–1855), Shenandoah Valley farmer and politician
- William E. Carson (conservationist) (1870–1942), Irish-born businessman and conservationist who helped found federal and state parks in Virginia
- William J. Carson (Medal of Honor) (1840–1913), Union Army soldier
- Bill Carson (ice hockey) (1900–1967), Canadian ice hockey forward
- William Carson (cricketer) (1866–1955), New Zealand cricketer
- William Carson Jr. (born 1950), American politician in the Delaware House of Representatives
- Billy Carson (actor) (William Hosley Carson, born 1955), American actor
- MV William Carson, a CN Marine passenger/vehicle icebreaker ferry

== See also ==
- Carson Mansion, built for William Carson (1825–1912), the Northern California lumber baron
- Bill Carson (disambiguation)
- Willie Carson (disambiguation)
- William Carlson (disambiguation)
