= Charles Carson =

Charles Carson may refer to:

- Charles C. Carson (1925–2002), American mortician
  - Charles C. Carson Center for Mortuary Affairs at Dover Air Force Base
- Charles Frederick Carson (1886–1960), Canadian-born soldier who served with the British Army
- Charles L. Carson (1847–1891), American architect
- Charles Carson (actor) (1885–1977), British actor
- Charles Carson (painter) (born 1957), Canadian painter
- Charles Carson, a character from the television series Downton Abbey

== See also ==
- Carson Charles, Trinidad and Tobago politician
