= Paul Joseph Kelly Jr. =

American judge (born 1940)

Paul Kelly
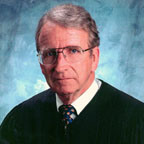

Senior Judge of the United States Court of Appeals for the Tenth Circuit
- Incumbent
- Assumed office December 31, 2017

Judge of the United States Court of Appeals for the Tenth Circuit
- In office April 13, 1992 – December 31, 2017
- Appointed by: George H. W. Bush
- Preceded by: Seat established
- Succeeded by: Joel M. Carson III

Personal details
- Born: Paul Joseph Kelly Jr. December 6, 1940 (age 85) Freeport, New York, U.S.
- Education: University of Notre Dame (BBA); Fordham University (JD)

Paul Joseph Kelly Jr. (born December 6, 1940) is a senior United States circuit judge of the United States Court of Appeals for the Tenth Circuit. His chambers are in Santa Fe, New Mexico.

== Education and career ==
Born in Freeport, New York, Kelly received a Bachelor of Business Administration degree from the University of Notre Dame in 1963 and a Juris Doctor from Fordham University School of Law in 1967. Kelly began his career at the law firm Cravath, Swaine, and Moore in New York City. He was then in private practice with the firm Hinkle, Bondurant, Cox & Eaton in Roswell and Santa Fe, New Mexico from 1967 to 1992. Kelly was a highly successful jury trial attorney. Upon returning to his office after each successful trial result, his staff would inquire about the result and Kelly's response was always, "Does a cat have a tail?" Kelly approached his practice in a relentless fashion, insisting that every angle of a case be investigated. He always enjoyed teaching young lawyers.

He was a New Mexico state representative from 1977 to 1981.

== Federal judicial service ==
On November 19, 1991, Kelly was nominated by President George H. W. Bush to a new seat on the United States Court of Appeals for the Tenth Circuit created by 104 Stat. 5089. He was confirmed by the United States Senate on April 8, 1992, and received his commission on April 13, 1992. He assumed senior status on December 31, 2017.

== Honors and other interests ==
In October 2008, Judge Kelly was honored in the Great Hall of the United States Supreme Court Building with the Professionalism Award of the American Inns of Court for the Tenth Circuit.

Kelly still works as a volunteer fire and emergency service volunteer. He is also an avid golfer and skier.

== Judicial philosophy ==
A law review article entitled "Who Would Win a Tournament of Judges" lists Kelly as one of the most commonly cited appellate judges currently serving. Only Judge Posner and Judge Easterbrook consistently bested Kelly. Kelly stated in an Above the Law article that he has no set judicial philosophy—he has decisions landing on both sides of the spectrum.

== Sources ==
Legal offices
New seat	Judge of the United States Court of Appeals for the Tenth Circuit; 1992–2017	Succeeded by Joel M. Carson III
