= Raoul Van Caenegem =

Belgian historian (1927–2018)

Raoul Van Caenegem Baron
- Born: Raoul Charles J. Van Caenegem; July 14, 1927; Ghent, Belgium
- Died: June 15, 2018 (aged 90); Ghent, Belgium
- Occupations: Historian, jurist
- Spouse: Patricia Carson (m. 1954; died 2014)
- Children: 3
- Awards: Francqui Prize (1974); Solvay Prize (1990); Sarton Medal (1994)
- Honors: Foreign member of the Royal Netherlands Academy of Arts and Sciences (1977); President of the Royal Flemish Academy of Belgium for Science and the Arts (1988); Ennobled as baron (1994/1995)

Academic background
- Education: Ghent University (Dr. iur., 1951; PhD history, 1953)

Academic work
- Discipline: Legal history; medieval history; comparative legal history
- Institutions: Ghent University
- Notable works: The Birth of the English Common Law; A Historical Introduction to Private Law; Judges, Legislators and Professors

Raoul Charles, Baron Van Caenegem (14 July 1927 – 15 June 2018) was a Belgian historian and jurist, and a leading scholar of European legal history. He is best known for comparative work on the divergence between common law and civil law, and for analyses of how power struggles between judges, legislators, and legal scholars shaped European legal institutions.

== Biography ==
=== Early life and education ===
Van Caenegem was born in Ghent in 1927. He completed secondary education at Sint-Barbaracollege in Ghent. He studied at Ghent University, earning a doctorate in law in 1951 and a doctorate in history in 1953, and regarded medievalist François Louis Ganshof as his principal mentor.

He pursued further specialist training in Paris (Sorbonne Faculty of Law, the École nationale des chartes, and the École pratique des hautes études) and in London (London School of Economics and the Institute of Historical Research).

=== Academic career ===
From 1954 Van Caenegem worked as an assistant at Ghent and obtained the (then) higher-education habilitation/aggregation in 1958. He was appointed lecturer and later full professor (1964) at Ghent University, teaching a wide range of courses in legal history, medieval history, and the history of England in both the Faculty of Law and the Faculty of Arts and Philosophy.

He served as Dean of the Faculty of Arts and Philosophy (1972–1974) and subsequently sat on the university’s governing board until 1977.

Van Caenegem also played a long leadership role in the local historical society Maatschappij voor Geschiedenis en Oudheidkunde te Gent: secretary-treasurer (1955–1986), vice-chair (1986–1990), and chair (1990–2007).

=== Research and writing ===
Van Caenegem published more than twenty monographs, many becoming standard works and appearing in translation. His scholarship ranged across Flemish and broader European legal history, medieval institutions, and English history.

A central theme of his comparative work was explaining why English common law and continental civil law developed so differently, and how institutional and professional rivalries—between courts, legislators, and academic jurists—shaped legal evolution. He was also noted for a wide comparative horizon, interest in synthetic interpretations across periods and regions, and engagement with sociological models (including curiosity about counterfactual approaches).

Many of his influential books grew out of his teaching at Ghent. For example, his introductory courses in private law history underpinned A Historical Introduction to Private Law, and his public-law and constitutional teaching informed A Historical Introduction to Western Constitutional Law. A specialist elective led to Judges, Legislators and Professors.

== Honours and memberships ==
Van Caenegem received major Belgian research distinctions, including the Francqui Prize (1974) and the Solvay Prize (1990). (The Solvay Prize is commonly identified as the Ernest-John Solvay Prize among FWO excellence prizes.) Ghent University awarded him the Sarton Medal in 1994.

He was elected to the Royal Flemish Academy of Belgium for Science and the Arts (KVAB) in 1974 and served as its president in 1988; he later became an honorary member (2002).

Internationally, he held visiting appointments and named lectureships, including the Arthur L. Goodhart Professorship at Cambridge (1984–1985), the Sir Henry Saville Fellowship at Merton College, Oxford (1989), and an Erasmus lectureship at Harvard (1991). He also served as adviser to institutions including the Max Planck Institute for European Legal History.

Van Caenegem became a foreign member of the Royal Netherlands Academy of Arts and Sciences in 1977.

In 2014, the European Society for Comparative Legal History established a biennial Van Caenegem Prize for the best publication by a young legal historian.

In July 1994 King Albert II of Belgium ennobled him as a baron; Ghent University later reported the grant of the title in 1995. His chosen motto was suum cuique tribuere.

== Personal life ==
Van Caenegem married the British-born historian Patricia Carson in 1954. The couple had three children. Carson was later ennobled with the personal title of baroness.

== Works ==
=== Selected books ===
- The Birth of the English Common Law, Cambridge University Press, 1973 (2nd ed. 1988).
- A Historical Introduction to Private Law, translated by D. E. L. Johnston, Cambridge University Press, 1992.
- A Historical Introduction to Western Constitutional Law, Cambridge University Press, 1995. ISBN 0521476933
- Judges, Legislators and Professors.
- Royal Writs in England from the Conquest to Glanvill.
- English Lawsuits from William I to Richard I.
- European Law in the Past and the Future.
- History of European Civil Procedure.
- Geschiedenis van het strafrecht in Vlaanderen.
- Geschiedenis van het strafprocesrecht in Vlaanderen.
- Les arrêts et jugés du Parlement de Paris sur appels flamands.
- Introduction aux sources de l’histoire médiévale.

== Literature ==
- G.R. Elton, Return to Essentials: Some Reflections on the Present State of Historical Studies, Cambridge University Press, 1991.
- Th. Denoël, Le nouveau dictionnaire des Belges, 1992.
- S. Dauchy, J. Monballyu, A. Wijffels (eds.), Auctoritates. Xenia R.C. Van Caenegem oblata (De auteurs van de rechtsontwikkeling), Brussels, Paleis der Academiën, 2000.
- Oscar Coomans de Brachène, État présent de la noblesse belge, Annuaire 2002; Annuaire 2004.
