= Charles Carson (painter) =

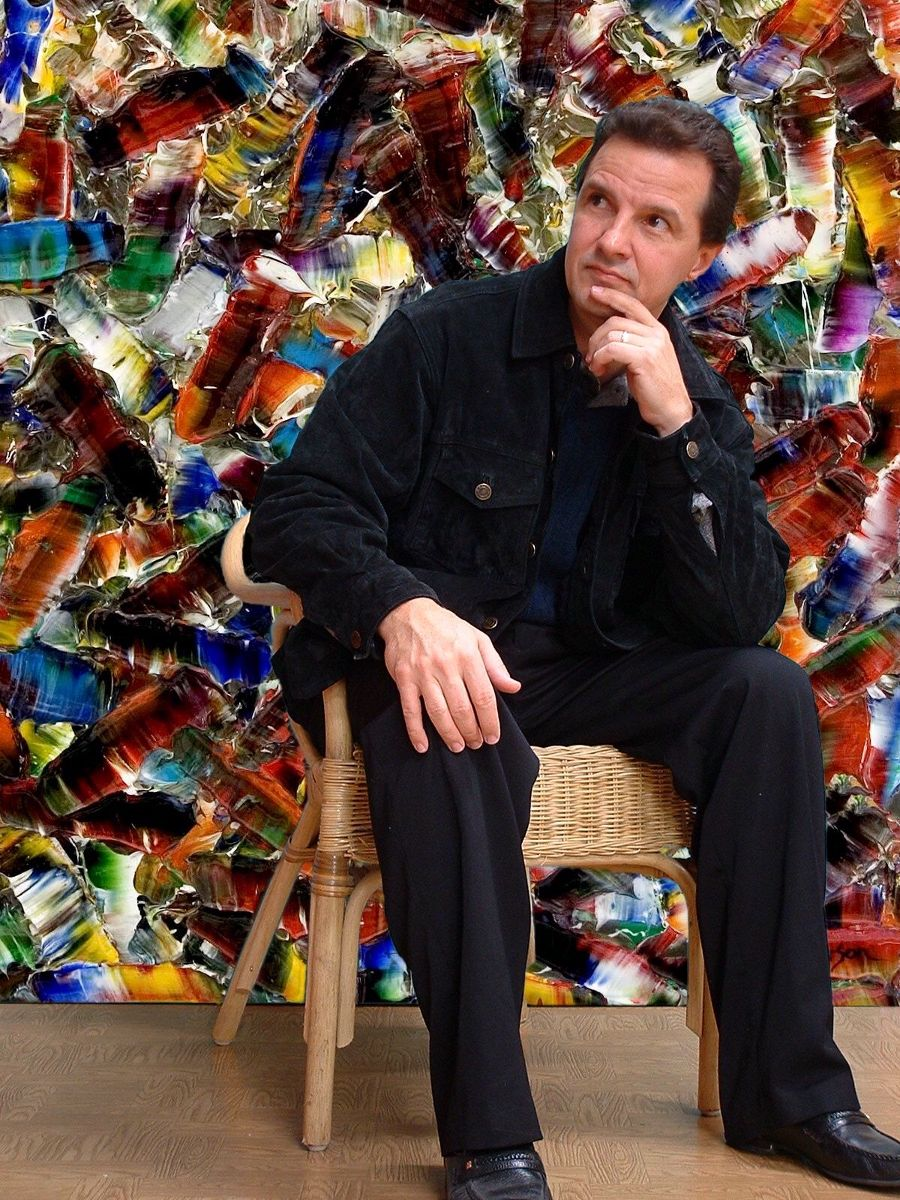
- Charles Carson
- Born: March 13, 1957; Montreal, Quebec, Canada
- Education: Self-taught
- Known for: Painter and Sculptor
- Movement: Carsonism

Charles Carson (born March 13, 1957) is a Canadian painter and sculptor. In 2013, he was named "Grand Master of Fine Arts" by The International Academy of Fine Arts of Quebec.

He is the inventor of Carsonism (from French carsonisme), a painting technique named after him.

== Biography ==
Charles Carson was born in the St-Michel neighborhood of Montreal, the fifth child in a modest family of ten.

== Career ==
A self-taught painter and sculptor, Carson began his career in Montreal. He then spent ten years in Colombia, living in Cartagena, Bogotá, and Medellín, where he exhibited his work in various galleries and museums.

He later divided his time between his studios in the Laurentians in Quebec and in Courbevoie, France. He also regularly stayed in the United States, where he spent several months a year.

== Classical period ==
Carson's classical figurative period predates 1992 and features more traditional academic works such as still lifes, portraits, and landscapes. One of the pivotal works from the end of this period is a tribute painting titled Hommage à Stefanoff (1898–1949), subtitled "The end of a cycle and the birth of Carsonism."

== Carsonism ==
In the early 1990s, writer Louis Bruens analyzed Carson's new semi-figurative works and published a study of them.Louis Bruens, "Le monde de Charles Carson un nouvel « isme »", Éditions Poly-Inter, 1992 The term onomastism was later taken up by Guy Robert.Guy Robert, "Carsonisme", Iconia Editions, 1993 In 2013, the term "Carsonism" was included in the Dictionnaire des onomastismes québécoisGabriel Martin, Dictionnaire des onomastismes québécois, Éditions du Fleurdelysé, 2013 and in the Multidictionnaire de la langue française in 2015.

Carson presented his first major Carsonist pieces at a 1993 exhibition presided over by Guy Robert at the Musée régional de Vaudreuil-Soulanges.

== Mosaic style ==
Carson's mosaic style is one of his defining artistic languages. In this approach, he constructs compositions using translucent overlays of color that interact much like the pieces of a stained glass window. These paintings are characterized by bold, spontaneous gestures where color harmony and spatial rhythm guide the viewer’s eye.

Carson works with acrylic pigments applied in thick or fluid layers, often with a painting knife, allowing color transparency to remain visible. The forms are not rigidly defined; instead, they emerge organically through the balance of color values, line flow, and textural play. The result evokes a mosaic in spirit—structured yet fluid, meticulously composed yet intuitively driven.

This style reflects Carson’s continuous exploration of light, movement, and the emotional power of color. It complements Carsonism in its dynamism and chromatic richness, remaining a vibrant and enduring part of his practice.

== Awards and distinctions ==
1993

  - Gold Medal, Centre international d’information et de diffusion des arts du Québec.

1994

  - Knight of the Order of Saint-Hubert, Sainte-Agathe-des-Monts, Canada, for the artwork titled La Chasse.

2002

  - Grand Gold Medal for International Influence, Salon international d’automne des beaux-arts de Montréal.

2003

  - Golden MIM Award, Grand Salon du MIM Award.

2006

  - Gold Medal, Gala Academia XXI at the Montreal Museum of Fine Arts.
  - Honorary Medal, Salon international de l’Académie européenne des arts (AEAF), Paris.

2007

  - Inducted as Master of Fine Arts, International Academy of Fine Arts of Quebec (AIBAQ), at the Montreal Museum of Fine Arts.
  - Guest of Honor and Gold Medalist, AEAF Salon, France.
  - Master Academician of Verbano, Accademia Internazionale Greci-Marino.
  - International Ambassador, Gala Academia XXI at the Montreal Museum of Fine Arts.

2009

  - "Artist of the Year".
  - Leonardo da Vinci Prize and Martin Luther King Human Rights Award, Associazione Italia in Arte, Italy.

2011

  - Tribute label on "Bourgogne Hautes-Côtes-de-Nuits, Chardonnay 2009", Domaine Nudant, France.
  - Special Human Rights Award, Grand Gala of Arte Internationale, Italy.
  - Vincent Van Gogh Award and General Giuseppe Garibaldi Award.

2012

  - Neptune Award, Italy.
  - Peace and Freedom Prize, Sogliano Cavour.
  - Visual Arts Master and Honorary Member, Associazione Culturale del Arte in Italia.
  - Spartacus Human Rights Award, Grand International Visual Arts Gala, Italy.
  - Grand Master of Fine Arts, Associazione Culturale del Arte contemporaneo, Italy.

2013

  - Apollo Award, Italy.
  - Grand Master in Fine Arts title from the International Academy of Fine Arts of Quebec.
  - Tribute label for "Bourgogne Hautes-Côtes-de-Nuits, Chardonnay 2009", Domaine Nudant.

2014

  - International Raffaello Sanzio Art Prize, Italy.
  - "Officer Academician", Mondial Art Academia.

2015

  - Hero of Creativity Award, New York.
  - Imperial Prize of Rome.
  - Diploma awarded for the Raffaello Sanzio title as Honorary and Meritorious Associated Art Master.

2016

  - International Colosseo Art Prize, recognizing Carson's career and talent (Palazzo Brancaccio, Rome).
  - Florida Ambassador for Mondial Art Academia.
  - Tribute label for "Bourgogne Hautes-Côtes-de-Nuits, Chardonnay 2009", Domaine Nudant.

2018

  - International Art Professionals Gold Medal in Abstract Painting from Mondial Art Academia, for L'Automne vue à vol d'oiseau, a mixed media mosaic.

== Critical reception ==
=== Quebec recognition ===
Carsonism is an artistic movement founded around Charles Carson's work in the early 1990s. Art historian Louis Bruens and Guy Robert, founder of the Montreal Museum of Contemporary Art, praised the singular use of color and rhythm in Carson's work. Bruens stated that Carson's work did not belong to any known "-ism" but represented "a truly distinct form of painting unlike anything being done in our time." He considered Carson a one-of-a-kind creator and noted that his painting style was both contemporary and accessible to all.

The term "Carsonism" was also included in the Multi Dictionnaire de la langue française, where it is defined as a pictorial technique created by Charles Carson characterized by "a totally unique pictorial writing style, transparency, clarity, and color juxtaposition."

=== International reception ===
In a 2015 article in Fine Art Magazine (New York), Victor Forbes called Carson a "Grand Master" and a "Hero of Creativity," likening his approach to that of Hemingway in literature. He wrote:

"Just as Hemingway developed a unique literary style often imitated but never equaled, Carson has created a singular pictorial language now referred to as 'Carsonism'."

Forbes described Carson as an inventive painter whose technique draws on the spiritual and aesthetic childhood experiences in Quebec's Catholic churches. His style, according to Forbes, is the result of years of experimentation with glass, lacquer, acrylics, light effects, and unconventional materials. Carson reportedly refused to exhibit his works until he had reached a truly personal style, one that no school or movement could assimilate.

He concluded:

"What Carson did was invent a way of life: that of a warrior with a brush, a ninja of color."Victor Forbes, ibid.

Art expert Guy Robert saw "a freshness, dynamism, and pictorial spontaneity comparable to Vivaldi's music or jazz." He considered Carson's work to stand "on the fertile border between abstraction and figuration," inviting viewers to interpret back and forth between recognizable forms and free visual language.

Jacques de Roussan, writer, publisher, and art historian, described Carson's style as "pictorial subliminism," an aesthetic that navigates between conscious and subconscious, driven by a unique sensitivity to motion, color, and light.

Colombian critic Gustavo Tatis Guerra dubbed Carson "the captain of the world's colors" and claimed his art "transcends stylistic boundaries to embody a universal language of emotion."

Leonor De la Cruz, writing in El Heraldo, compared his work to jazz, highlighting "mastered improvisation and rhythmic vitality rare in contemporary painting."

Finally, Italian expert Michele Miuli described Carsonism as a "phenomenological revolution," a style that captures the tensions of the natural world in a choreography of light and matter, both accessible and innovative.
