= Carol Channing =

American actress (1921–2019)

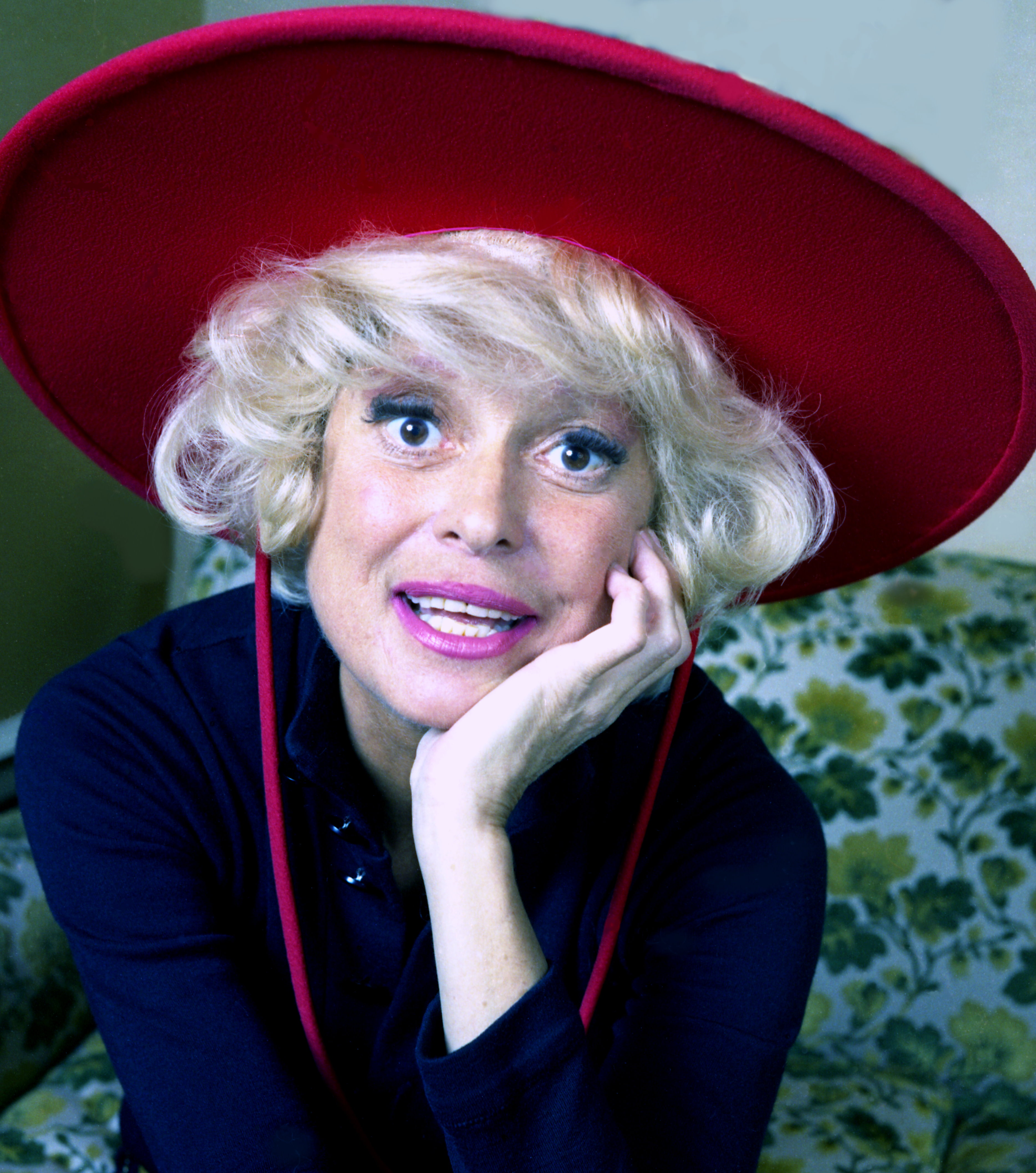
- Channing in 1973
- Born: Carol Elaine Channing; January 31, 1921; Seattle, Washington, U.S.
- Died: January 15, 2019 (aged 97); Rancho Mirage, California, U.S.
- Education: Bennington College
- Occupations: Actress; comedian; singer; dancer
- Years active: 1941–2016
- Spouses: Theodore Naidish (m. 1941; div. 1944) Alex Carson (m. 1953; div. 1956) Charles Lowe (m. 1956; died 1999) Harry Kullijian (m. 2003; died 2011)
- Children: 1

Carol Elaine Channing (January 31, 1921 – January 15, 2019) was an American actress, comedian, singer and dancer who starred in Broadway and film musicals. Each of her characters typically possessed a fervent expressiveness and an easily identifiable voice.

Channing originated the lead roles in Gentlemen Prefer Blondes in 1949 and Hello, Dolly! in 1964, winning the Tony Award for Best Actress in a Musical for the latter. She revived both roles several times throughout her career, playing Dolly on Broadway for the final time in 1995. She was nominated for her first Tony Award in 1956 for The Vamp, followed by a nomination in 1961 for Show Girl. She received her fourth Tony Award nomination for the musical Lorelei in 1974.

As a film actress, she won the Golden Globe Award and was nominated for the Academy Award for Best Supporting Actress for her performance as Muzzy in Thoroughly Modern Millie (1967). Her other film appearances include The First Traveling Saleslady (1956) and Skidoo (1968). On television, she appeared as an entertainer on variety shows. She performed The White Queen in the TV production of Alice in Wonderland (1985), and she had the first of many TV specials in 1966, titled An Evening with Carol Channing.

Channing was inducted into the American Theater Hall of Fame in 1981 and received a Lifetime Achievement Tony Award in 1995. She continued to perform and make appearances well into her 90s, singing songs from her repertoire and sharing stories with fans, cabaret-style. She was one of the "legends" interviewed in the award-winning documentary Broadway: The Golden Age, by the Legends Who Were There. She released her autobiography, Just Lucky I Guess, in 2002, and Larger Than Life—a documentary film about her life and career—was released in 2012.

== Early life ==
Channing was born in Seattle, Washington on January 31, 1921, the only child of Adelaide (née Glaser; 1886–1964) and George Channing (1888–1957). Adelaide Channing was of German-Jewish ancestry. George Channing, born George Christian Stucker, changed his surname for religious reasons before Carol's birth. His birth certificate described him as "colored"; his mother was Black, and his father was German-American. George Channing became a Christian Science practitioner, editor, and teacher. A city editor at The Seattle Star, he took a job at The San Francisco Chronicle; the family moved to California when Carol was two years old. Carol Channing was raised as a Christian Scientist.

During a 1994 interview, Channing revealed that she first wanted to perform on stage as a singer when she was in the fourth grade. She recalled being emotionally drawn to the stage after seeing Ethel Waters perform. Channing has said that in the fourth grade she ran for and was elected class secretary: "I stood up in class and campaigned by kidding the teachers. The other kids laughed. I loved the feeling — it was a very good feeling; it still is." She read the class minutes every Friday, often impersonating the children who were discussed. Her election to class secretary continued through grammar and high school: "It was very good training—like stock." She also considered the fact that she was able to see plays while very young to have been an important inspiration:

I was lucky enough to grow up in San Francisco and it was the best theater town that Sol Hurok knew and he brought everybody from all over the world and we schoolchildren got to see them with just 50-cent tickets.

Channing attended Aptos Junior High School and Lowell High School in San Francisco, graduating in 1938. She won the Crusaders' Oratorical Contest and a free trip to Hawaii with her mother in June 1937. When she was 17, Channing left home to attend Bennington College in Vermont. At that time, Channing's mother told her for the first time that her father George had Black ancestry. Channing's mother felt that she ought to have this information since she was going off to college; she did not want her daughter to be surprised if she ever had a Black baby. (Note: Channing told Larry King in an interview that because her father's birth certificate was destroyed in a fire, she was unable to verify the details of his ancestry beyond some old photos and the information her mother had given her.)

Channing majored in drama and dance at Bennington. She would entertain every Friday night. During her junior year, she began trying out for acting parts on Broadway. After playing a small part in the revue, The New Yorker noted her performance: "You'll be hearing more from a comedienne named Carol Channing." The inspiration she received from that brief notice made her decide to quit school. However, it was four years before she found another acting job. During that period, she performed at small functions or benefits, including some in the Catskill resorts. She also worked in a Macy's bakery.

== Career ==
=== Stage ===
Channing was introduced to the stage while helping her mother deliver newspapers to the backstage of theatres. (Note: We went through the stage door alley (for the Curran Theatre), and I couldn't get the stage door open. My mother came and opened it very well. Anyway, my mother went to put the Monitors where they were supposed to go for the actors and the crew and the musicians, and she left me alone. And I stood there and realized – I'll never forget it because it came over me so strongly – that this is a temple. This is a cathedral. It's a mosque. It's a mother church. This is for people who have gotten a glimpse of creation and all they do is recreate it. I stood there and wanted to kiss the floorboards.)

Her first job on stage in New York City was in Marc Blitzstein's No for an Answer, starting January 1941, at the Mecca Temple (later New York City Center). She was 19. She moved to Broadway for Let's Face It!, where she was an understudy for Eve Arden, who was 13 years older than Channing. Much later, in 1966, Arden was hired for the title role in Hello Dolly! in a road company when Channing left to star in the film Thoroughly Modern Millie. Channing won the Sarah Siddons Award for her work in Chicago's theatres in 1966 (Eve Arden won the next year).

Finding roles that suit the strange and wonderful charms of Carol Channing has always been a problem to Broadway showmen. She looks like an overgrown kewpie. She sings like a moon-mad hillbilly. Her dancing is crazily comic. And behind her saucer eyes is a kind of gentle sweetness that pleads for affection.

— Life magazine cover story, 1955

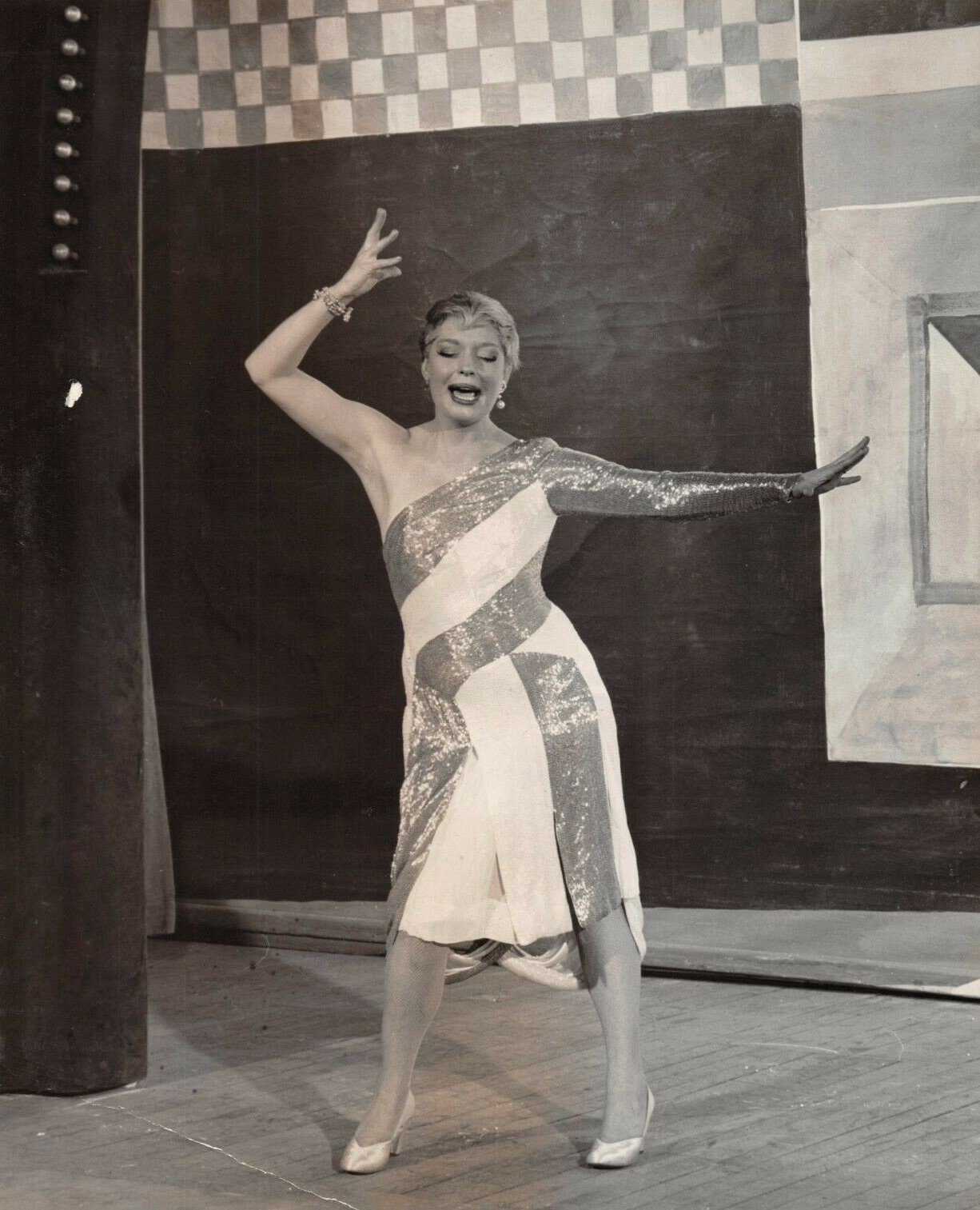
Channing performing Diamonds are a Girl's Best Friend in Gentlemen Prefer Blondes (1949)

Five years later, Channing had a featured role in Lend an Ear (1948), for which she received her Theatre World Award and launched her as a star performer. She credited illustrator Al Hirschfeld for helping make her a star when he put her image in his widely published illustrations. She said that his drawing of her as a flapper was what helped her get the lead in her next play, the Jule Styne and Anita Loos musical Gentlemen Prefer Blondes. From that role, as Lorelei Lee, she gained recognition, with her signature song from the production, "Diamonds Are a Girl's Best Friend," among the most widely known.

In January 1950, Time magazine ran a cover story about her becoming a new star on Broadway, followed by cover stories in Life magazine in 1955 and 1964. (Note: Hirschfeld illustration of Channing as Lady Macbeth) (Note: Hirschfeld illustration of Channing with George Burns) (Note: Hirschfeld illustration of Channing with Liza Minnelli and Zero Mostel) (Note: Hirschfeld illustration of Channing with Matt Mattox in The Vamp)

In 1956, Channing married her manager and publicist Charles Lowe. During the 1950s, he produced the Burns and Allen comedy show, which starred George Burns and Gracie Allen. When Allen was forced to discontinue performing due to heart ailments, she saw that Burns needed a partner to play against on stage since he was best as a straight man. She remembered that Channing, like she, had one of the most distinctive and recognizable voices in show business, and Lowe asked Channing if she would perform with Burns. She accepted immediately, and Channing worked on and off with Burns through the late 1950s. Burns also appeared in her TV special, An Evening with Carol Channing, in 1966.

In 1961, Channing became one of the few performers nominated for a Tony Award for work in a revue (rather than a traditional book musical); she was nominated for Best Actress in a Musical for the short-lived revue Show Girl.

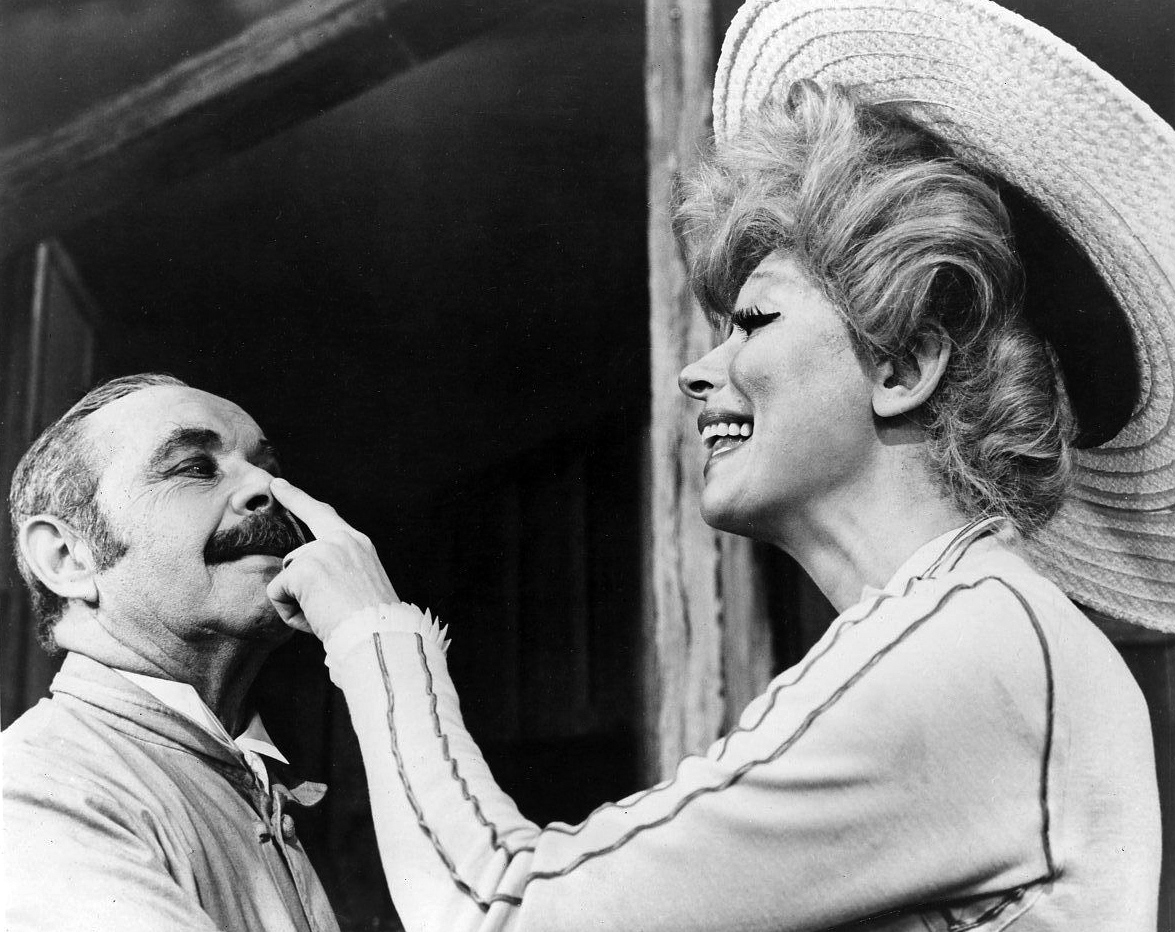
David Burns and Channing in Hello, Dolly! (1964)

Channing came to national prominence as the star of Jerry Herman's Hello, Dolly! (1964). Her performance as Dolly Levi won the Tony Award for Best Actress in a Musical. She recalled that playwright Thornton Wilder so loved the musical, which was based on his play, The Matchmaker, that he came once a week. He also planned to rewrite his 1942 play The Skin of Our Teeth, with Channing playing the parts of both Mrs. Antrobus and Sabina but died before he could finish it.

Approval of her performance in the 1960s meant she was often invited to major events, including those at the White House, where she might sing. Channing was invited to the Democratic convention in 1964 in Atlantic City, New Jersey where she sang "Hello, Lyndon" for Lyndon B. Johnson's campaign. She was a favorite of Lady Bird Johnson, who once gave her a huge bouquet after a show. In 1967, she also became the first celebrity to perform at the Super Bowl halftime show.

The old-fashioned plot of Hello, Dolly, when first described, might seem uninspired, says columnist Dick Kleiner:

But then you sit in the audience and Carol Channing comes out, turns on her huge eyes and monumental smile—and you sit there with a silly grin on your face for 2 1/2 hours, bathed in the benevolent spell of a great comedienne...It is hard to imagine her doing anything else but making people smile. She is that human curio, the born female comic.

The show had first opened on Broadway on January 16, 1964, and by the time the show closed in late December 1970, it had become the longest-running musical in Broadway history, with nearly 3,000 performances. Besides Channing, six other stars played the title role during those seven years: Ginger Rogers, Martha Raye, Betty Grable, Pearl Bailey, Phyllis Diller and Ethel Merman.

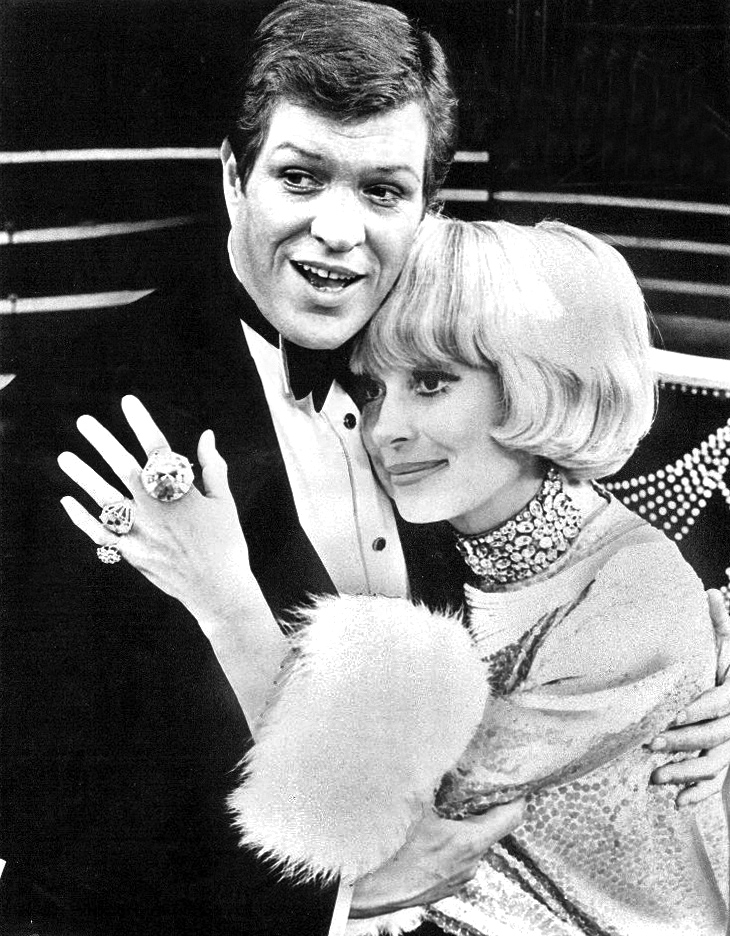
Peter Palmer and Channing in Lorelei (1973)

Al Hirschfeld's illustration of her was printed on the front page of the "Sunday Theatre" section of The New York Times. She felt that this image captured the essence of her character, having posited in writing, "How did the great Hirschfeld know precisely what I was thinking? ... To be Hirschfelded is an eerie experience. You better not have anything to hide, because he'll expose it like a neon sign" ... (Note: Hirschfeld illustration of Channing in Hello, Dolly) The illustration was also printed on the cover of magazines, including Horizon. She later appeared in the movie biography about his life, The Line King, in 1996.

Channing reprised her role of Lorelei Lee when the musical Lorelei, directed by Robert Moore and choreographed by Ernest O. Flatt, premiered in 1973 at the Oklahoma City (6000 seat) Civic Center Music Hall and broke all box office records after six days' worth of performances sold out within 24 hours.

To commemorate this record event, the street running in front of the Music Hall was renamed Channing Square Drive in her honor. Also in the cast were Peter Palmer, Brandon Maggart, Dody Goodman, and Lee Roy Reams. For nearly a year, the stage musical then toured 11 cities across the country. Lorelei had earned a hefty profit by the time it opened on Broadway at the Palace Theatre on January 27, 1974, and ran for a total of 320 performances. Channing also appeared in two New York City revivals of Hello, Dolly!, and toured with it extensively throughout the United States.

She performed songs from Hello, Dolly during a special television show in London in 1979.

=== Film ===
Channing also appeared in a number of films, including The First Traveling Saleslady (1956), in which she gave future star Clint Eastwood his first onscreen kiss; the cult film Skidoo; and Thoroughly Modern Millie (starring Julie Andrews, Mary Tyler Moore, John Gavin, and Beatrice Lillie). For Millie she received a nomination for the Academy Award for Best Supporting Actress, and was awarded a Golden Globe Award for Best Supporting Actress – Motion Picture. Channing said she was especially grateful to Andrews for helping her develop her character: "She will forever be my angel," she says.

Due to her success on Broadway in Hello Dolly! and her co-starring role in Thoroughly Modern Millie, Channing attracted the attention of Lucille Ball and Desi Arnaz, who were interested in starring her in a sitcom. Directed and produced by Arnaz and written by Bob Carroll Jr. and Madelyn Davis (who co-wrote I Love Lucy and The Lucy Show), The Carol Channing Show starred Channing as Carol Hunnicut, a small-town girl trying and failing to make it in New York City show business. Character actors Richard Deacon and Jane Dulo were in the supporting cast. The pilot was filmed in front of a live audience (with a laugh track added) at Desilu in 1966 but did not sell as a series.

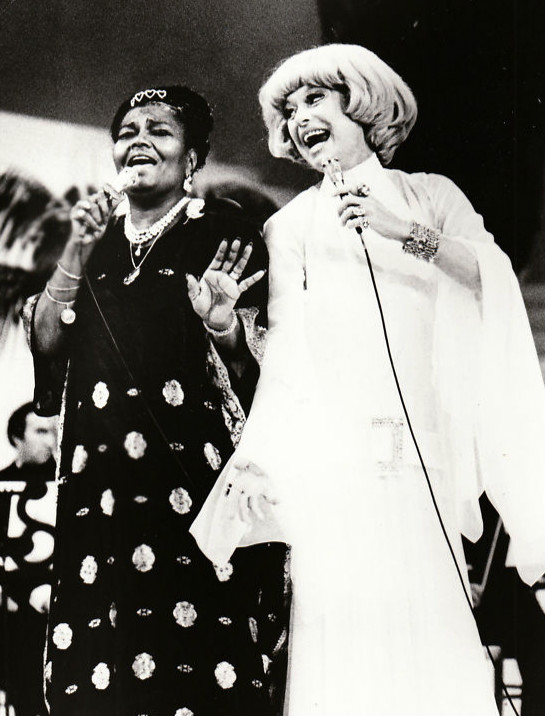
Channing performing with Pearl Bailey in 1973

During her film career, Channing also made some guest appearances on television sitcoms and talk shows, including What's My Line? where she appeared in 11 episodes from 1962 to 1966. Channing did voice-over work in cartoons, most notably as Grandmama in an animated version of The Addams Family from 1992 to 1995.

=== Television ===
During most of her career, Channing was asked to perform in various skits or appear as a guest on regular shows. In the 1960s, she was on The Andy Williams Show. In 1974, she participated in the television special Free to Be... You and Me, based on Marlo Thomas' best-selling album of 1972, in which Channing also appeared. Free... won the Emmy Award for Outstanding Children's Special and The Peabody Award. In 1980, she guest starred on The Muppet Show where she participated in several skits, performed a medley of Jeepers Creepers, and sang her signature song, Diamonds are a Girl's Best Friend, as a duet with Miss Piggy. In 1985, she played the role of the White Queen in the television special Alice in Wonderland. In 1986, Channing appeared on Sesame Street and sang a parody of the song "Hello, Dolly!" called "Hello, Sammy!", a love song being sung by Carol to a character known as Sammy the Snake (as voiced by Muppets creator Jim Henson). Carol, in this parody segment, serenades Sammy telling him just how much she loves and adores him while Sammy coils himself around Carol's arms. Carol's song includes lyrics such as: "So..turn on your charm, Sammy/Coil yourself around my arm, Sammy/Sammy the Snake, I'll stake a claim on you". Songwriter Jule Styne, who wrote the score for Gentlemen Prefer Blondes, invited her on his television special in 1987 where she performed another one of her signature songs, "Little Girl from Little Rock".

In 1993, she poked fun at herself in an episode of The Nanny. The episode "Smoke Gets in Your Lies" shows the producer auditioning for a new musical, and Channing, playing herself, is trying out. Just after the producer announces he wants a stage presence that is instantly recognizable to the entire country, Channing begins with her signature "Hello, Dolly!", but he stops her with a resounding "Next!".

In January 2003, Channing recorded the audiobook of her best-selling autobiography Just Lucky, I Guess: A Memoir of Sorts, directed and produced by Steve Garrin at VideoActive Productions in New York City. It was during the recording sessions that she received a phone call from her childhood sweetheart Harry Kullijian that rekindled their romance and led to their marriage a few months later. In January 2008, the documentary Carol Channing: Larger Than Life (which chronicles Channing's life and career) was released.

In January 2006 Channing made a guest appearance as herself on the adult animated comedy Family Guy. She appeared in a scene where she was in a boxing match between her and professional boxer Mike Tyson. Brian bets on Tyson and loses, as Channing kept getting up no matter how many times Tyson knocks her down and Tyson passed out due to exhaustion. In a later interview, she revealed that the show's writers initially asked her to say a specific curse word, which she refused, compromising on the word "friggen" instead. "I did an episode of 'Family Guy', in which they wanted me to say the F-word. You know that one? Well, I refused. We finally agreed that I would say 'friggen'… That was our compromise. And I think it was just as funny as the other".

== Personal life ==
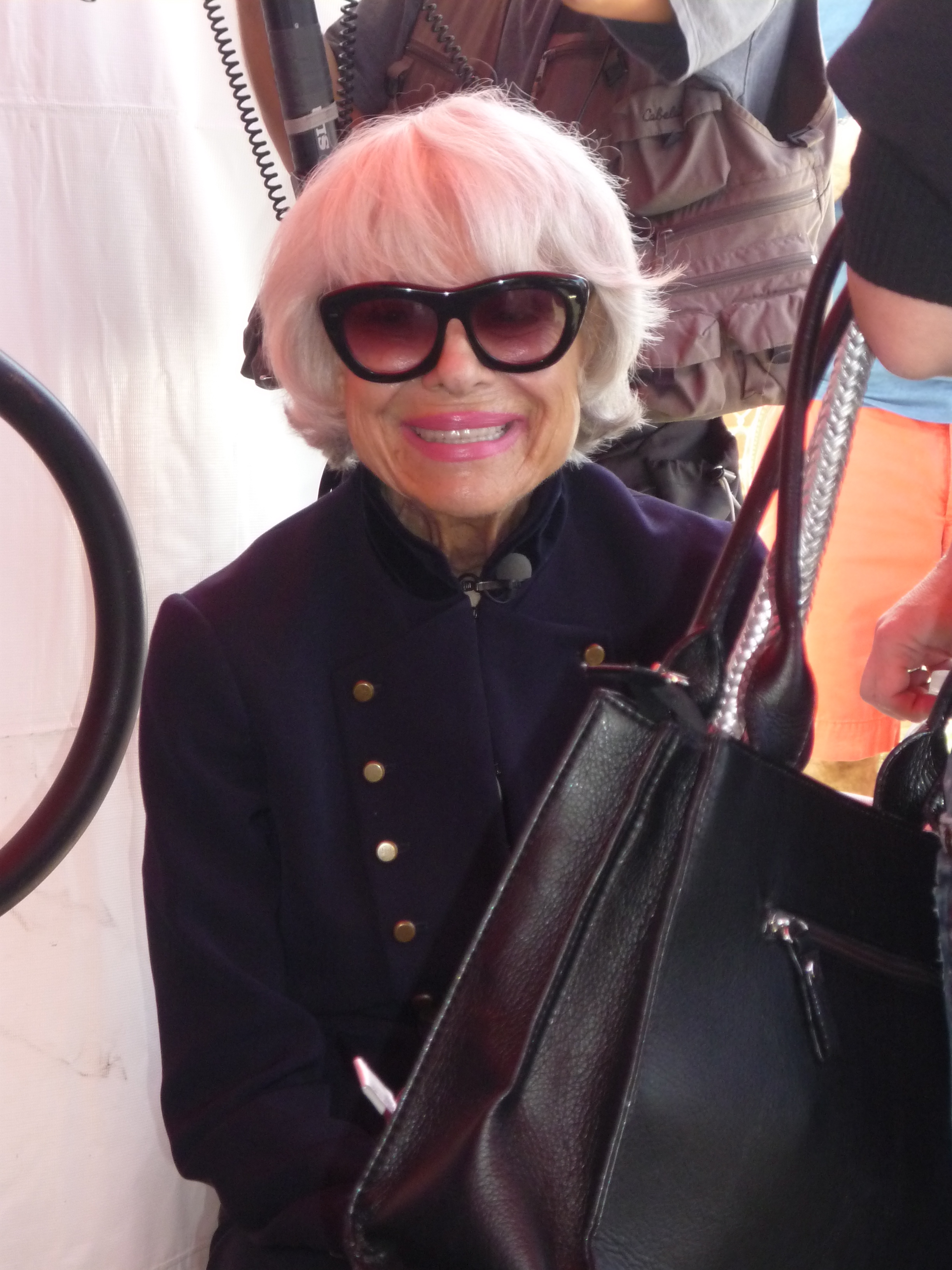
Channing in 2009

Channing publicly revealed her black ancestry in 2002. In her 2002 autobiography, Just Lucky I Guess, Channing wrote:

I know it's true the moment I sing and dance. I'm proud as can be of [my Black ancestry]. It's one of the great strains in show business. I'm so grateful. My father was a very dignified man and as white as I am.

In the 2011 documentary Carol Channing: Larger Than Life, Channing publicly stated that her mother had been Jewish.

Channing was a Christian Scientist and a survivor of ovarian cancer.

=== Marriages, relationships, and child ===
Channing was married four times. Her first husband was Theodore Naidish, whom she married in 1941 when she was 20. He was a writer who in 1944 wrote Watch Out for Willie Carter, but during the nearly five years of their marriage, earned little income: "There was no money for food, clothing or housing." Still, Channing adored his émigré Jewish family, stating in her memoir, "There is nothing so safe and secure as an immigrant, foreign-language-speaking family all around you. It was a dream come true for me. They look after you, you look after them. They make chicken in the pot if you're sick. You learn marvelous new-sounding words every minute." Channing and Naidish lived near his grandparents in Brighton Beach in the borough of Brooklyn in New York City. She remembered his grandfather Sam Cohen introducing her to some of his neighborhood friends, who were amazed that she enjoyed hearing their funny stories. "They were delighted that I almost ate them up alive," she wrote, "because they were so funny, especially since such appreciation was coming from what we all thought then was a shiksa (me)." She learned to speak fluent Yiddish from "Grandpa Cohen", a skill that helped her understand the boardwalk conversations that went on around her in town.

Channing's second husband, Alexander F. Carson, known as Axe, or "The Murderous Ax", played center for the Ottawa Rough Riders Canadian football team and was also a private detective. They married in 1950 and divorced in September 1956. They had one son.

In September 1956, "immediately following the entry of the divorce decree" from Carson, Channing married her manager and publicist Charles Lowe. In 1960, Carson's parental rights to the couple's son were severed due to his abandonment, and his and Channing's son took his stepfather's surname. As the judge stated, "The differences in environment and miles would result in a gross injustice in itself to the child, who at this very tender stage does not even know what his real father looks like. He probably doesn't even realize that the present husband of Mrs. Channing is not his father." Channing Lowe publishes his cartoons as Chan Lowe. Channing filed for divorce from Lowe in 1998, but her estranged husband died before the divorce was finalized.

After Lowe's death and until shortly before her fourth marriage, Channing's companion was Roger Denny, an interior designer.

In 2003, while recording the audiobook of her autobiography Just Lucky, I Guess, at VideoActive Productions, NYC, produced and directed by Steve Garrin, Channing rekindled her romance with her junior high school sweetheart, Harry Kullijian, and they married on May 10, 2003. They later performed at their old junior high school in a benefit for the school. They also promoted arts education in California schools through their Dr. Carol Channing and Harry Kullijian Foundation. They resided in both Modesto, California, and Rancho Mirage, California. They would also spent some of their time in Palm Springs. Harry Kullijian died on December 26, 2011, the eve of his 92nd birthday.

=== Diet ===
Channing had unique dietary habits. In 1978, she said she had not eaten restaurant food in 15 years and preferred only organic food. When invited to restaurants, she brought several sealed containers with her own food, such as zucchini or chopped celery, and simply asked for an empty plate and glass. For dessert, she ate seeds. By 1995, Channing had resumed eating food served by restaurants. However, she did not drink alcoholic beverages of any kind.

=== Death and tributes ===
Channing died from natural causes on January 15, 2019, at her home in Rancho Mirage, California, at the age of 97. On January 16, 2019, the lights on Broadway were dimmed in her honor. A crowd congregated outside the St. James Theatre, as it had also been the anniversary of the opening of the original Broadway production of Hello, Dolly! Betty Buckley dedicated the January 15, 2019 performance of the national tour of the revival of Hello, Dolly! in San Diego to Channing following her death. Channing's ashes were scattered between the Curran Theatre and the Geary Theater in San Francisco.

== Legacy and honors ==
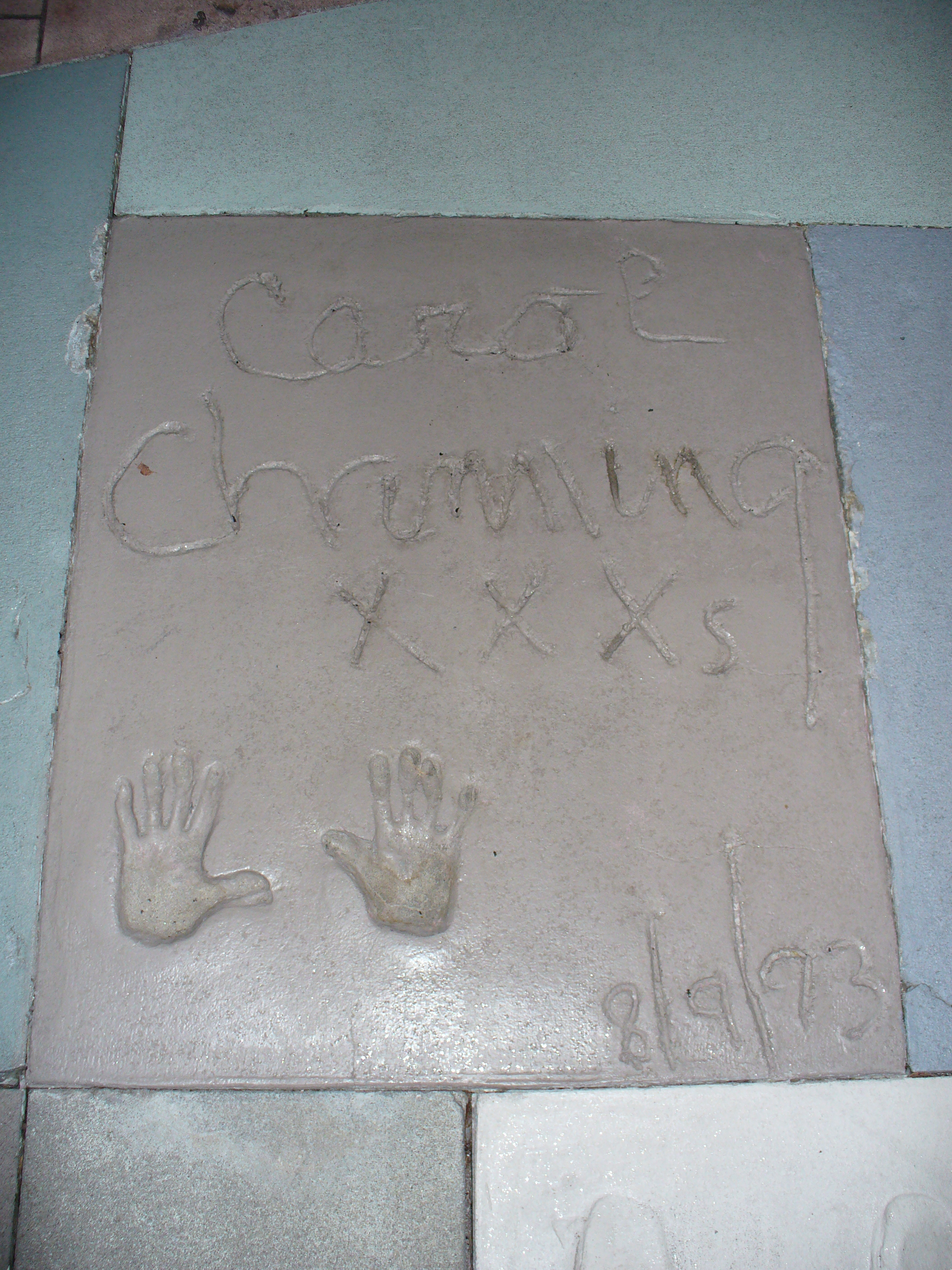
The handprints of Carol Channing in front of The Great Movie Ride at Disney's Hollywood Studios at the Walt Disney World Resort

- 1970, Channing was the first celebrity to perform at a Super Bowl halftime.
- In 1973, it came to light during the Watergate hearings that Channing was on a master list of Nixon's political opponents, informally known as Nixon's "enemies list". She subsequently said that her appearance on this list was the highest honor in her career.
- 1981, Channing was inducted into the American Theater Hall of Fame.
- 1984, Lowell High School renamed its auditorium The Carol Channing Theatre in her honor.
- 1988, The city of San Francisco, California, proclaimed February 14, 1988, to be "Carol Channing Day."
- 1995, she was awarded a Lifetime Achievement Tony Award.
- 2004, she was awarded an honorary doctorate in Fine Arts by California State University, Stanislaus.
- 2004, she received the Oscar Hammerstein Award for Lifetime Achievement in Musical Theatre.
- 2010, a Golden Palm Star on the Palm Springs Walk of Stars was dedicated to her.
- In December 2010, Channing was honored at Broadway Cares/Equity Fights AIDS Gypsy of the Year competition.
- On November 30th, 1977, Channing received a star on the Hollywood Walk of Fame at 6233 Hollywood Blvd for her contributions to television.

== Theater ==
Year	Title	Role	Notes
1941	No for an Answer		
1941	Let's Face It!	Maggie Watson	Understudy for Eve Arden
1942	Proof Thro' the Night	Steve	
1948	Lend an Ear	Mrs. Playgoer	
1949–52	Gentlemen Prefer Blondes	Lorelei Lee	
1953	Pygmalion	Eliza Doolittle	
1954	Archy and Mehitabel (musical)	Mehitabel the cat	
1954	Wonderful Town	Ruth Sherwood	Replacement for Rosalind Russell
1955	The Vamp	Flora Weems	
1959	Show Business		
1961	Show Girl	Lynn	
1963	The Millionairess	Epifania Ognisanti di Parerga	
1963–66; 1977–79; 1981–83; 1994–96	Hello, Dolly!	Mrs. Dolly Gallagher Levi	
1971	Four on a Garden	Mrs. Dunkelmayer, Betty, Irene, Mrs. Wexel	
1973–75	Lorelei	Lorelei Lee	
1974	Jule's Friends at the Palace	Herself	Broadway Special; benefit concert
1976	The Bed Before Yesterday		
1980	Sugar Babies	Carol (Herself)	
1984	Jerry's Girls	Herself	
1985	Legends!	Sylvia Glenn	
1987	Happy Birthday, Mr. Abbott!	Herself	Broadway Special; benefit concert
1988	Broadway at the Bowl	Herself	
1991	Give My Regards to Broadway	Herself	Broadway Special; benefit concert
2003	Singular Sensations	Herself	
2004	Razzle Dazzle!		
2014	Hello, Dolly! 50th Anniversary	Herself	
2014	Time Steppin'	Herself	
2016	95th Birthday in Celebration of a Broadway Legend	Herself	

== Awards and nominations ==
Year	Award	Category	Work	Result
1956	Tony Award	Best Actress in a Musical	The Vamp	Nominated
1961	Tony Award	Best Actress in a Musical	Show Girl	Nominated
1964	Tony Award	Best Actress in a Musical	Hello, Dolly!	Won
1968	Academy Awards	Best Supporting Actress	Thoroughly Modern Millie	Nominated
1968	Golden Globe	Best Supporting Actress – Motion Picture	Thoroughly Modern Millie	Won
1968	Tony Award	Special Award		Won
1974	Tony Award	Best Actress in a Musical	Lorelei	Nominated
1979	Olivier Award	Best Actress in a Musical	Hello, Dolly!	Nominated
1991	Grammy Award	Album for Children	Prokofiev: Peter and the Wolf; A Zoo Called Earth/Gerald McBoing Boing	Nominated
1995	Tony Award	Lifetime Achievement Award		Won
1996	Drama Critics Circle	Lifetime Achievement Award		Won
2002	Grammy Award	Grammy Hall of Fame	Hello, Dolly! Original Broadway Cast Recording	Won
2002	Tony Award (West)	Lifetime Achievement Award	Benefit for AIDS and Actors' Fund	Won
