= Alexander Carson =

Alexander Carson may refer to:

- Alexander Carson (author) (1776–1844), Irish author
- Alexander Carson (filmmaker) (born 1982), Canadian filmmaker

== See also ==
- Alex Carson (1923–1981), Canadian football player
