= Joseph Carson =

Joseph Carson is the name of:

- Joseph Carson (pharmacist) (1808–1876), American physician and botanist
- Joseph K. Carson (1891–1956), mayor of Portland, Oregon, United States
- Jo Carson (Josephine Catron Carson; 1946–2011), American author
- Joe Carson (footballer) (born 1953), Scottish footballer
- Joe Carson (musician) (1936–1964), American country-music performer
- Joe Carson (Petticoat Junction), a main fictional character on the television sitcom Petticoat Junction
