= Robert Carson =

Robert Carson may refer to:

- Robert Carson (numismatist) (1918–2006), British numismatist
- Robert Carson (actor) (1909–1979), American actor
- Robert Carson (baseball) (born 1989), American baseball player
- Robert Carson (writer) (1909–1983), American screenwriter, novelist, and short story writer
- Robert Henry Carson (1885–1971), Canadian life insurance agent and politician
- Robert "Sonny" Carson (1936–2002), activist and community leader in Brooklyn

== See also ==
- Carson (surname)
- Carson (disambiguation)
- Robert Carsen (born 1954), Canadian opera director
