= Delia E. Wilder Carson =

American educator

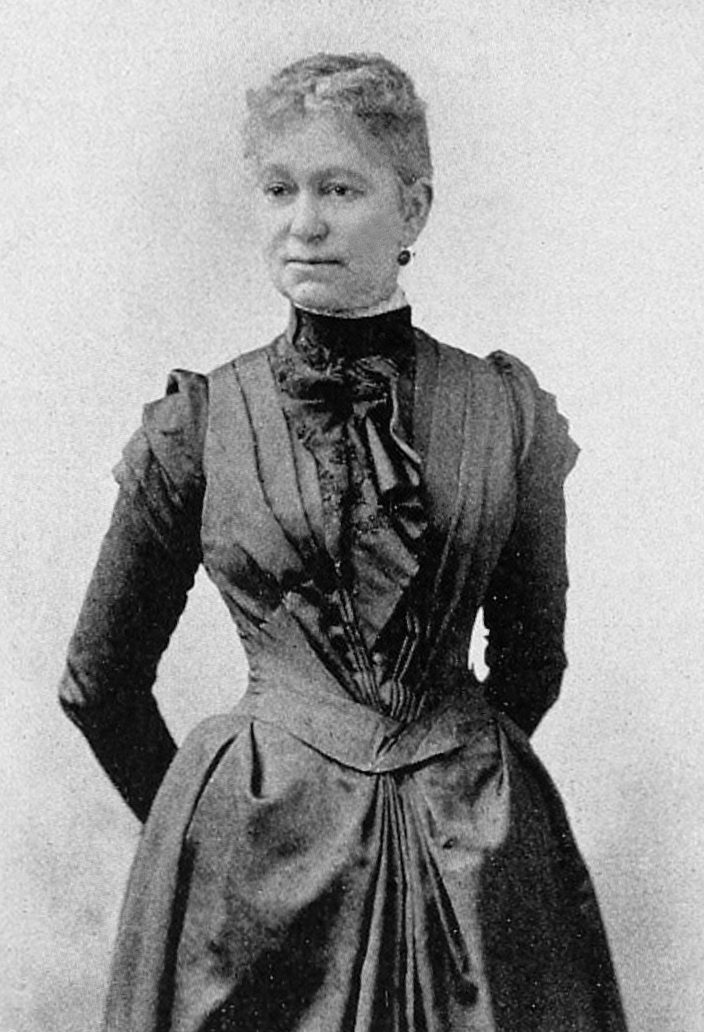
Delia E. Wilder Carson

Delia E. Wilder Carson (January 25, 1833 – 1917) was an American educator from the U.S. state of New York. She taught mathematics, and served as preceptress of Ladies' Hall, at the University of Wisconsin (now University of Wisconsin–Madison).

== Early years and education ==
Wilder was born in Athens, New York, January 25, 1833. Her father, Thomas Wilder, was one of eight brothers who migrated from Massachusetts when the eldest was a young man. Several were teachers, and all were closely identified with the development and progress of Genesee and Wyoming counties, New York, where they ultimately settled. Her mother's maiden name was Hannah Dow (b. July 20, 1806). Her siblings included: Henry Fayette Wilder, Sarah D. Wilder, Mary Wilder, Thomas Eugene Wilder, and Helen T. Wilder.

Carson was educated in the Alexander Classical Academy. She spent one term in the Albany Normal School (now University at Albany, SUNY), from which she received a diploma.

== Career ==
From 1853 to 1856 she taught Mathematics at the Central Illinois Female Institute in Bloomington, Illinois and in 1859, took a similar position at the Bloomington Female College till it closed in 1871. She taught in Beloit, Wisconsin from 1871 to 1887 and she was preceptress of Ladies' Hall and a teacher of mathematics at the University of Wisconsin. Carson devoted much time to the study of art, and become identified with general art interests in Wisconsin, giving courses of lectures and leading classes of women in the study of the history of art. She traveled extensively, spending time in Italy, Sicily, Morocco, Algiers, Egypt, and Greece.

== Personal life ==
In 1853, she married Delos Carson (born Wyoming County. N.Y., September 12, 1828). The next year, they moved to Bloomington, Illinois where he was engaged in business until October 28, 1862, when he enlisted in Company I, 3rd Regiment Illinois Volunteer Cavalry, from which he was promoted to Captain in the Sixth United States Heavy Artillery (colored) and was killed at Fort Pillow. They had one child.
