= Joel M. Carson III =

American judge (born 1971)

Joel Carson
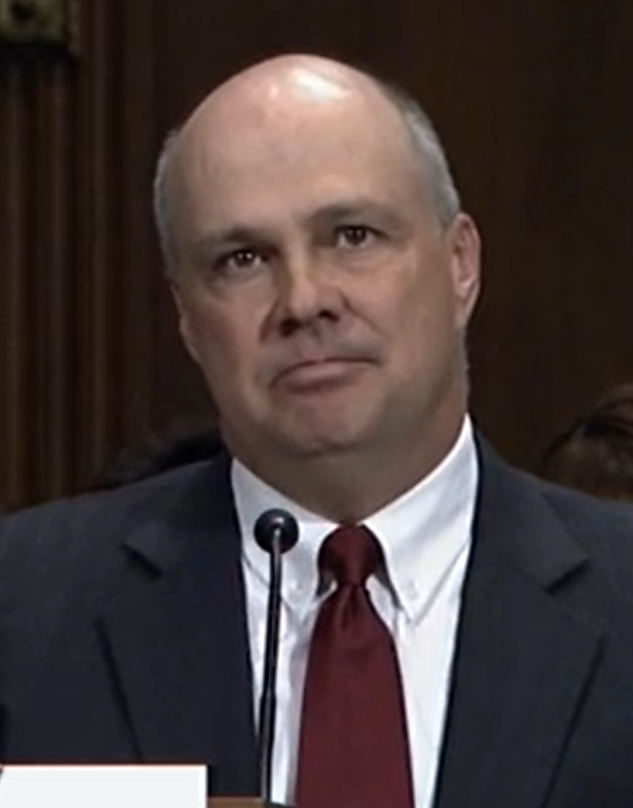

Judge of the United States Court of Appeals for the Tenth Circuit
- Incumbent
- Assumed office May 17, 2018
- Appointed by: Donald Trump
- Preceded by: Paul Joseph Kelly Jr.

Personal details
- Born: Joel McElroy Carson III; 1971 (age 54–55) Artesia, New Mexico, U.S.
- Education: Texas Tech University (BBA); University of New Mexico (JD)

Joel McElroy Carson III (born 1971) is an American lawyer and jurist serving as a United States circuit judge of the United States Court of Appeals for the Tenth Circuit.

== Biography ==
Carson graduated from Texas Tech University in Lubbock in 1994 with a Bachelor of Business Administration degree. He then attended the University of New Mexico School of Law in Albuquerque, where he was an editor of the Natural Resources Journal. He graduated in 1997 with a Juris Doctor.

After law school, Carson served as a law clerk to Judge Bobby Baldock of the United States Court of Appeals for the Tenth Circuit from 1997 to 1999. He then went on to be a partner at the Roswell, New Mexico-based law firm of Hinkle, Hensley, Shanor & Martin, LLP, where he practiced for nine years and focused on natural resources law, mining law, and regulatory law. He served for five years as General Counsel of Mack Energy Corporation, an independent oil and gas company in Artesia, New Mexico. He started his own law firm in 2014, Carson Ryan LLC. where he practiced until becoming a Circuit Judge.

Carson served on New Mexico Governor Susana Martinez's energy and environment transition teams following her election in 2010. He is a member of the New Mexico Judicial Performance Evaluation Commission.

== Federal judicial service ==
=== Magistrate judge tenure ===
Carson served as a part-time United States magistrate judge of the United States District Court for the District of New Mexico from 2015 to 2018.

=== Court of Appeals service ===
In 2017, Carson was recommended to the White House Counsel's Office by Congressman Steve Pearce. On December 20, 2017, President Donald Trump nominated Carson to serve as a United States Circuit Judge of the United States Court of Appeals for the Tenth Circuit, to the seat that was vacated by Judge Paul Joseph Kelly Jr., who subsequently assumed senior status on December 31, 2017. On February 14, 2018, a hearing on his nomination was held before the Senate Judiciary Committee. On March 15, 2018, his nomination was reported out of committee by a 15–6 vote. On May 11, 2018, the United States Senate invoked cloture on his nomination by a 71–24 vote. On May 15, 2018, his nomination was confirmed by a 77–21 vote. He received his commission on May 17, 2018. He was sworn in on May 18, 2018.

== Notable cases ==
=== First Amendment ===
Writing for the panel in Vogt v. Rodebush, Carson recognized that the First Amendment prevents public employers from conditioning employment on political beliefs, affiliation, or non-affiliation. Carson held that the First Amendment enables employees to refuse "a candidate all support, or only some forms of support," because, whether the refusal is "partial or complete," the employee is choosing to exercise her First Amendment right of political affiliation by refusal.

=== Fourteenth Amendment ===
In Doe v. Rocky Mountain Classical Academy, the Defendant suspended and disenrolled the Plaintiff because he wore earrings at school, violating school's dress code which permitted girls (but not boys) to wear earrings. Plaintiff argued that the school violated his right to equal protection under the Fourteenth Amendment. The district court held that the school did not violate Plaintiff's equal protection rights because the dress code imposed "comparable burdens" on both boys and girls. Carson, writing for a unanimous panel of the Tenth Circuit, reversed, holding that the district court had erred "by applying the comparable burdens test instead of intermediate scrutiny." But Carson noted that the opinion did not "address whether comparable burdens are relevant to a proper intermediate scrutiny analysis."

Legal offices
| Preceded by Paul Joseph Kelly Jr. | Judge of the United States Court of Appeals for the Tenth Circuit; 2018–present | Incumbent |
