= Bill Carlson (footballer) =

Australian rules footballer

Personal information
- Full name: Charles John William Carlson
- Born: 17 November 1885; Brighton East, Victoria
- Died: 8 September 1964 (aged 78); Chelsea, Victoria
- Original team: Elwood Juniors

Playing career^{1}
Years	Club	Games (Goals)
1905–06	St Kilda	4 (4)
- ^{1} Playing statistics correct to the end of 1906.

Bill Carlson (17 November 1885 – 8 September 1964) was an Australian rules footballer who played with St Kilda in the Victorian Football League (VFL).
