= Paul Carson (sportscaster) =

Canadian sportscaster (1950-2010)

- Born: November 22, 1950; London, Ontario
- Died: December 21, 2010 (aged 60); North Vancouver, British Columbia
- Citizenship: Canadian
- Occupation: Sportscaster

Paul Carson (October 22, 1950 - December 21, 2010) was a Canadian sports broadcaster. His work included hosting Sports Page on Vancouver station CKVU-TV, and he was a founder of the Team 1040 all sports radio station, CKST in Vancouver.

He died of pancreatic cancer on December 21, 2010, at the age of 60.
