= Matthew Carson =

Matt or Matthew Carson may refer to:

- Matt Carson (author) (born 1975), American author
- Matt Carson (baseball) (born 1981), American baseball player
- Matthew Carson (footballer) (born 2002), English footballer
- Matthew Carson (actor) (born 2012), brother of Gabe Carson
