= Arthur Carson =

Arthur L. Carson

3rd President of Silliman University
- In office 1939–1953
- Preceded by: Roy H. Brown
- Succeeded by: Leopoldo T. Ruiz

Personal details
- Born: May 29, 1895 Tionesta, Pennsylvania
- Died: April 11, 1985 (aged 89) City of New York, New York
- Education: Pennsylvania State College; Cornell University
- Profession: Missionary, educator

Arthur L. Carson (May 29, 1895 – April 11, 1985) was an American missionary and educator who served as the president of Silliman University in Dumaguete, Philippines, from 1939 to 1953.

== Biography ==
Carson was born on May 29, 1895, in Tionesta, Pennsylvania. A graduate of Pennsylvania State College and Cornell University, Carson served as a missionary for the Board of Foreign Missions of the Presbyterian Church in the U.S.A. He was assigned in China from 1921 to 1939 where he was engaged in agricultural work from 1923 to 1926 in the locality of Weixian, Shandong Province, and later on as director of the Rural Institute of Cheeloo University in Jinan from 1931 to 1939.

After his tour in China, Carson was transferred by the Board of Foreign Missions of the Presbyterian Church to the Philippines, where he served as president of Silliman University from 1939 to 1953. When World War II broke out, he joined the Philippine resistance forces and continued his missionary work in the mountain barrio of Malabo, Municipality of Valencia, Province of Negros Oriental.

After his stint in Silliman, he served as Director for the Church World Service in the Philippines from 1962 to 1963 and as President of Trinity College of Quezon City in the Philippines from 1963 to 1967. His published writings include Silliman University, 1901-1959 and Higher Education in the Philippines. Carson died on April 11, 1985, in the City of New York.
