= John Carson =

John Carson or similar, may refer to:

== People ==
=== Entertainment ===
- Johnny Carson (1925–2005), American television host and comedian
- Fiddlin' John Carson (1868–1949), American musician
- Jack Carson (1910–1963), Canadian-born, American based film actor
- John Carson (actor) (1927–2016), English actor
- John David Carson (1952–2009), American actor

=== Politics ===
- John Hazzard Carson (1752–1841), American politician and delegate to the Fayetteville Convention
- John J. Carson (1888–1971), American politician who served in the Truman Administration
- John Carson (Colorado politician), American politician
- John Carson (Northern Ireland politician) (born 1933), Northern Ireland politician
- John Carson (Georgia politician) (born 1971), Georgia (American) politician
- Johnnie Carson (born 1943), American diplomat

=== Other persons ===
- Johnny Carson (American football) (1930–2009), American football player
- John Carson (basketball) (born 1959), Canadian university / professional basketball player
- John Carson (cricketer) (born 1945), New Zealand cricketer
- John Renshaw Carson (1886–1940), transmission theorist
- John Miller Carson Jr. (1864–1956), American general
- John Carson (physician) (1752–1794), American medical doctor

== Other uses ==
- "Johnny Carson" (song), a 1977 song by the Beach Boys off the album The Beach Boys Love You

== See also ==
- Jack Carson (disambiguation)
