= George Carson =

George Carson may refer to:

- George Carson (footballer) (1925–1989), Scottish footballer
- George Carson (trade unionist) (1848–1921), Scottish trade unionist and politician
- George Henry Carson (1832–1901), merchant, road builder and city council member in Los Angeles, California
