= Sally Carson =

New Zealand marine biologist

Sally F. Carson
- Born: Canada
- Education: Mount Allison University (BSc, 1984) University of Alberta (MSc)
- Known for: Citizen science projects; Educational guides on New Zealand seashore life
- Scientific career
- Fields: Marine biology
- Workplaces: University of Otago, New Zealand Marine Studies Centre

Sally F. Carson is a Canadian marine biologist and the director of the New Zealand Marine Studies Centre at the University of Otago.

Carson completed a bachelor of science degree at Mount Allison University in 1984, and a master's in science at the University of Alberta. Much of her postgraduate research was completed at Bamfield Marine Sciences Centre, Vancouver Island.

In 2017, Carson designed a national citizen science project to involve members of the public in the long term monitoring of the New Zealand seashore. She has written a range of educational resources for primary and intermediate school students, as well as a series of identification guides to the plants and animals which inhabit New Zealand's seashores.

== Selected publications ==
- New Zealand Seashore Secrets (with Denis Page; Hodder Moa Beckett, 1994)
- Southern seas: discovering marine life at 46 [degrees] south (with Keith Probert and John Jillet; University of Otago Press, 2005)
- Southern NZ, sandy & muddy shore guide (NZ Marine Studies Centre, 2014)
- Collins Field Guide to the New Zealand Seashore (with Rod Morris; Collins, 2017)
- Reproductive ecology of an obligately fissiparous population of the sea star Stephanasterias albula Stimpson. Philip V. Mladenov, Sally F. Carson and Charles W. Walker. Journal of Experimental Marine Biology and Ecology. Volume 96, Issue 2, 25 April 1986, Pages 155-175.
- Energetic Content of Eggs, Larvae, and Juveniles of Florometra serratissima and the Implications for the Evolution of Crinoid Life Histories. Larry R. McEdward, Sally F. Carson and Fu-Shiang Chia. International Journal of Invertebrate Reproduction and Development. Volume 13, 1988 - Issue 1.
