= Clarence Buford Carson =

American historian, academic, veteran and author

Clarence B. Carson
- Born: Clarence Buford Carson; December 9, 1925; Chambers County, Alabama, US
- Died: April 9, 2003 (aged 77); Phenix City, Alabama, US
- Education: Auburn University (BA, MA); Vanderbilt University (PhD)
- Occupations: Historian; professor; author
- Spouse: Myrtice Sears
- Children: 2

Clarence Buford Carson (December 9, 1925 - April 9, 2003) was an American historian, academic, veteran, and author. He is most well-known for his books on United States history, United States Government, and economics.

== Early life ==
Carson was born on December 9, 1925, in Chambers County, Alabama to Jim Carson and Exah Hughes Carson. His father was a tenant farmer of limited means.

Carson enlisted in the military and fought in World War II. After returning from war, he attended Auburn University graduating with a bachelor's and then a master's degree in history. He also obtained a Ph.D. in history from Vanderbilt University. During this time, and based on his upbringing and childhood, he had a particular focus on the importance of the individual and their responsibility. His dissertation was entitled Embattled Individualist: The Defense of the Idea of Individualism, 1890-1930.

== Career ==
Carson began teaching at Elon College in North Carolina in the fall of 1957. He taught at multiple universities until 1973, including Grove City College in Grove City, Pennsylvania and Hillsdale College in Hillsdale, Michigan. During this time, he began writing, and, after 1973, he shifted his focus to a career in writing.

He ended up publishing 12 books, a series on the history of the United States, and hundreds of articles. He wrote books on economics, history, government, and communism, as well as a memoir. His six-volume series on American history covers the colonial period up to the mid-1990s. He published numerous articles, many for the Foundation for Economic Education.

== Works ==
- The Fateful Turn: From Individual Liberty to Collectivism 1880-1960 (1963)
- The War On the Poor (1969)
- Flight from Reality (1969)
- The American Tradition (1970)
- Throttling the Railroads (1971)
- The Rebirth of Liberty: The Founding of the American Republic 1760-1800 (1973)
- The world in the Grip of an Idea (1979)
- Organized Against Whom? (1983)
- Basic Communism: Its Rise, Spread and Debacle in the 20th Century (1990)
- Basic Economics (1990)
- Basic American Government (1993)
- Swimming Against the Tide (1998)

=== The Basic History of the United States series ===
- A Basic History of the United States, Volume 1: The Colonial Experience, 1607 1774 (1983)
- A Basic History of the United States, Volume 2: The Beginning of the Republic 1775-1825 (1984)
- A Basic History of the United States, Volume 3: The Sections and the Civil War 1826-1877 (1985)
- A Basic History of the United States, Volume 4: The Growth of America, 1878-1928 (1985)
- A Basic History of the United States, Volume 5: The Welfare State 1929-1985 (1986)
- A Basic History of the United States, Volume 6: America in Gridlock, 1985-1995 (1996)
