= Ann Elizabeth Carson =

Canadian poet (1929–2023)

- Born: 19 March 1929; Toronto, Ontario, Canada
- Died: 16 December 2023 (aged 94); Toronto, Ontario, Canada
- Occupation: Poet
- Website: http://www.anncarson.com

Ann Elizabeth Beattie Carson (19 March 1929 – 16 December 2023) was a Canadian poet, author, artist, sculptor, feminist and psychotherapist.

== Biography ==
Carson's love of words and writing began in elementary school. She published sporadically in high school, during her undergraduate years at Trinity College, University of Toronto, and while raising four children.

Ann wrote, painted, and sculpted in Toronto and Manitoulin Island. She especially enjoyed reading from her work at multi-media events with other poets, writers, and artists, and with dancers and musicians. Carson also led workshops in how the arts create a new perspective in the ways we see ourselves and our world.

Carson belonged to the League of Canadian Poets, Old Town ARTbeat, the Ontario Poetry Society, the Toronto Heliconian Club, and the Tower Poetry Society. She was a mother to four and grandmother to six. She loved music, theatre, gardening, gallery hopping, and bookstore browsing with family and friends. Carson died at her home in Toronto on 16 December 2023, at the age of 94.

== Publications ==
- My Grandmother's Hair, a tale about how our family stories make our memories and shape our lives (Edgar Kent, 2007)
- Shadows Light, a collection of poetry and sculptures (Longboat Alliance, 2005)
- The Risks of Remembrance, new poems (Words Indeed, 2010)

Selections and reviews of Carson's books have appeared in publications, including the Sudbury Star (2005/10), Canadian Women Studies/les cahiers de la femme (2008/09, 2011), Herizons magazine (2008/9), p o e t r y'z o w n (2009/10, 2011), Celebrating Poets over 70, an anthology published by McMaster University Centre for Gerontological Studies and the Tower Poetry Society (2010), Island Mists, an anthology of the Poetry Institute (2010), Manitoulin Cross-pollination Two, exhibit catalogue of writers and artists (2010), Monhegan Memo No. 6 (2010), OWN Quarterly (December 2010) and Exile Quarterly (September 2010).

== Awards ==
Carson was selected as one of Toronto's Mille Femmes at the 2008 Luminato Festival, which paid tribute to women who have made a contribution to the arts.
