= Richard E. Carson =

American researcher and engineer

- Education: Brown University; UCLA
- Scientific career
- Workplaces: Yale University

Richard Ellis Carson is an American researcher and biomedical engineer. He is currently Professor of Radiology and Biomedical Imaging and of Biomedical Engineering at Yale University. At Yale he is also Director of the PET Center and Director of Graduate Studies in Biomedical Engineering. His research focuses on the application of mathematical techniques to the study of humans and primates with Positron Emission Tomography.

Carson received a Bachelor of Science in Applied Math-Biology from Brown University in 1977. He completed his doctoral work at the University of California, Los Angeles in 1983.

In 2016, Carson was awarded the Distinguished Investigator Award from the Academy of Radiology Research. In 2017, he was recognized by the IEEE for "contributions to quantification in Positron Emission Tomography including image reconstruction, tracer kinetic modeling techniques, and development and application of mathematical and statistical methods for novel radiopharmaceuticals." Carson has been a fellow of the IEEE since 2019.
