= Adam Carson (disambiguation) =

Adam Carson (born 1975) is an American drummer.

Adam Carson may also refer to:

- Adam Carson (footballer) (??–1935), Scottish footballer
- Adam Clarke Carson (1869–1941), American soldier
