= William Carson (Virginia) =

Virginia politician and landowner

Member of the Virginia House of Delegates for Warren and Clarke Counties, Virginia
- In office January 7, 1839 – December 1, 1839
- Preceded by: William Castleman
- Succeeded by: Nathaniel Burwell
- In office December 5, 1836 – December 31, 1837
- Preceded by: position created
- Succeeded by: William Castleman

Member of the Virginia House of Delegates for Shenandoah County, Virginia
- In office December 3, 1831 – December 2, 1832 Serving with Samuel Bare
- Preceded by: Wright Gatewood
- Succeeded by: John Newman
- In office December 3, 1827 – December 6, 1829 Serving with Samuel Bare, Charles Lovell
- Preceded by: William R. Almond
- Succeeded by: John Newman

Member of the Virginia Council of State
- In office June 25, 1815 – January 8, 1818

Member of the Virginia House of Delegates for Shenandoah County, Virginia
- In office December 2, 1811 – December 3, 1815 Serving with Daniel Madeira, John Evans, Charles U. Lovell
- Preceded by: John Evans
- Succeeded by: Samuel Strickler

Personal details
- Born: circa 1774 Dunmore County, Virginia
- Died: December 21, 1855 Warren County, Virginia
- Resting place: Stephens City, Frederick County, Virginia.
- Occupation: farmer, politician

William Carson (December 17, 1774 – December 21, 1855), was a Virginia planter and politician who served in both houses of the Virginia General Assembly as well as on the Council of State following the War of 1812.

== Early and family life ==
Born probably on his father's farm near the Shenandoah River at the start of the American Revolutionary War in short-lived Dunmore County, Virginia, his mother was named Jane. His father had begun purchasing land in the Shenandoah Valley in what was the vast Frederick County of the Colony of Virginia in the 1750s.

== Career ==
Carson briefly served as a justice of the peace for then-vast Shenandoah County from 1809 to 1811, and was removed from that post by 1815.

In late 1811, Carson won election to the Virginia House of Delegates and served on the Committee of Claims. He was re-elected to the part time position twice, and during his second term he served on the Committee to Examine the Executive Expenditures, then on the Committee of Propositions and Grievances. In the spring of 1813, as the situation with Great Britain grew dire, Carson was appointed to a special committee to provide for "Defense of the State Against Invasion or Insurrection". In 1814 Carson was appointed to the prestigious Committee of Privileges and Elections, then on November 14, 1814 he was elected to the Council of State. However, he failed to reach Richmond to take his seat until June 21, 1815, and so missed all the meetings during the War of 1812. Although Carson attended regularly for a while, his attendance became sporadic and absences longer, even neglecting to sign the daily record of the Council's actions. On January 1, 1818 Carson requested to be removed, shortly before the Council's scheduled meeting to remove two members as required by the then state Constitution, so his last meeting was on January 8, 1818.

The location of Carson's farm may have changed in his lifetime, as increasing population of once-vast Shenandoah County caused creation of several additional counties. During his childhood, Virginia's legislature had split Shenandoah County twice. In 1778 Rockingham County was created at what had been its southern end, then in 1792 Madison County was formed from Shenandoah's northeastern portion. The next splits of Shenandoah County occurred in 1831, when Page County was created from Shenandoah and Rockingham Counties, about a decade after a federal census placed Carson in the "Isabella Furnace" area (now near Luray). Woodstock remained the Shenandoah County seat, so in 1833, when printer Samuel Kercheval listed the important people of northwestern Virginia, Carson was one of the 9 notable men from near Woodstock in Shenandoah County, as distinguished from the thirteen men who lived around Mount Jackson, the 8 notables of Mount Jackson and another 8 notable men from the New Market area and 20 from the rest of Page county. Carson helped create Warren County from the northeastern part of Shenandoah County, and he lived in Warren County in 1840 and in 1850, during the last census of his long life.

In the 1820 census, Carson's household of 19 people included eight slaves. A decade later, Carson owned one male and one female slave in Shenandoah County's eastern district. His slaveholdings increased to three slaves (two adult males and one elderly female) in the 1840 census. In the 1850 census, the last of his life, Carson was listed as 76 year old farmer living alone and owning $7000 of real estate. He also owned six slaves, ranging from a 60 year old woman and 46 year old man to girls aged 12, 6 and 5 years old and a 10 year old boy.

== Personal life ==
Carson never married, although a white woman and children lived with him in the 1820s, which his biographer presumes were relatives.

== Death and legacy ==
Carson's gravestone listing his death date as December 21, 1855 remains in the family cemetery in now rapidly developing Stephens City, Frederick County.
