= Deb Carson =

American radio and television personality and national sports anchor

- Occupations: Sportscaster, TV host, radio personality, news anchor, reporter
- Website: www.debcarson.com

Deb Carson is an American radio and television personality and national sports anchor for Fox Sports Radio. She currently anchors the network's National Sports Reports weekdays during The Dan Patrick Show, The Rich Eisen Show, and The Herd with Colin Cowherd . She was previously Co-Host of FSR's nationally syndicated morning drive show, "The Stephen A. Smith Show." Carson has been a frequent sports contributor to a variety of media outlets, including KFI's "The Bill Handel Show" and Premiere Networks' “America Now with Meghan McCain” and “America Now with Andy Dean,” for which she was named Outstanding Reporter/Correspondent at the 2012 Gracie Awards.

== Biography ==
=== Early life ===
Carson attended Baylor University, earning a Bachelor of Business Administration degree. As a sophomore at Baylor, she became the first female student-sportscaster to broadcast a Southwest Conference game as part of the Baylor Baseball Broadcast Crew. She was also a member of Kappa Alpha Theta sorority.

=== Early career ===
After graduating from Baylor, Carson moved from Texas to Los Angeles, CA after accepting an offer from Merv Griffin Enterprises to join the producing staff of the hit game show Wheel of Fortune. In addition to her behind-the-scenes and contestant coordinator duties, she also served as Vanna White's stand-in. Carson was later chosen to Co-Host with Bob Eubanks on Wheel of Fortune Live, the live, touring version of the hit TV show.

Carson made a name for herself as a TV Host, Anchor and Reporter, working on a variety of News and Entertainment projects. She also crossed over into radio, anchoring News and Traffic for several radio stations throughout Southern California.

Beyond her radio and television broadcasting accomplishments, Carson has also appeared in numerous television shows and movies such as Lethal Weapon, Dexter, Desperate Housewives, The Mentalist, The Unit, Will & Grace, Ghost Whisperer, Evan Almighty, and many others.

=== Fox Sports Radio ===
Carson returned to sports in 2006, joining Fox Sports Radio as a National Anchor and On-Air Personality. In addition to delivering breaking sports news and updates on scores from across the country, she also wrote and produced the popular weekend segments "All Entertainment News with Deb Carson," "Carson's Corner…Sports Headlines You May Have Missed," "Carson's Highlight Central," and "The Athlete Twitter Segment." Carson moved to weekday mornings in early 2010 to join Stephen A. Smith on his new FSR show. While co-hosting with Smith, her "Deb's News and Notes" segment became a listener favorite, highlighting the quirky and absurd stories of the day. Carson has consistently been referred to by co-hosts and listeners as "the voice of reason" throughout her career.

== Philanthropy ==
Carson is an outspoken supporter of a variety of children's charities, including Boys & Girls Clubs of America and P.S. I Love You Foundation, a group that fosters educational and inspirational enrichment programs for at-risk kids in the Los Angeles area.

Deb also became an advocate in the fight to bring awareness to and find a cure for pancreatic cancer following her father's diagnosis in 2015. Carson wore purple every day during the month of November, Pancreatic Cancer Awareness Month, and posted a daily photo captioned with #PurpleForAPurpose on her social media accounts to bring attention to the disease. She continues to be a supporter of Hirshberg Foundation for Pancreatic Cancer Research and other groups searching to find early detection methods for the disease.
