= Captain James Carson =

Captain James Carson was a pseudonym used by the Stratemeyer Syndicate for the five volume The Saddle Boys series. There were no other Stratemeyer books published with that pseudonym used for the author's name.

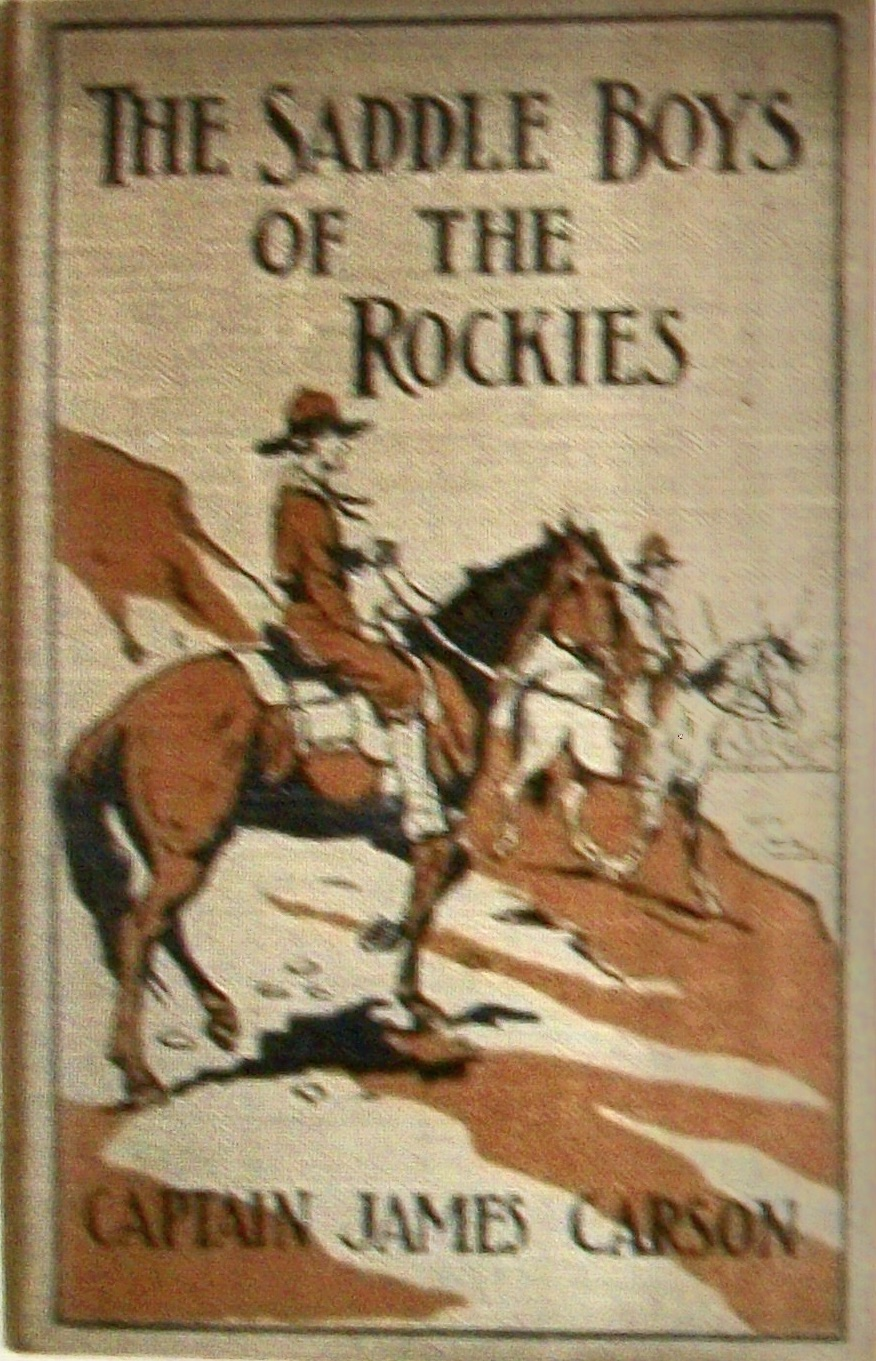

== Book titles ==
- The Saddle Boys Of The Rockies (1913)
- The Saddle Boys In The Grand Canyon (1913)
- The Saddle Boys On The Plains (1913)
- The Saddle Boys At Circle Ranch (1913)
- The Saddle Boys On Mexican Trails (1915)
