= Musée régional de Vaudreuil-Soulanges =

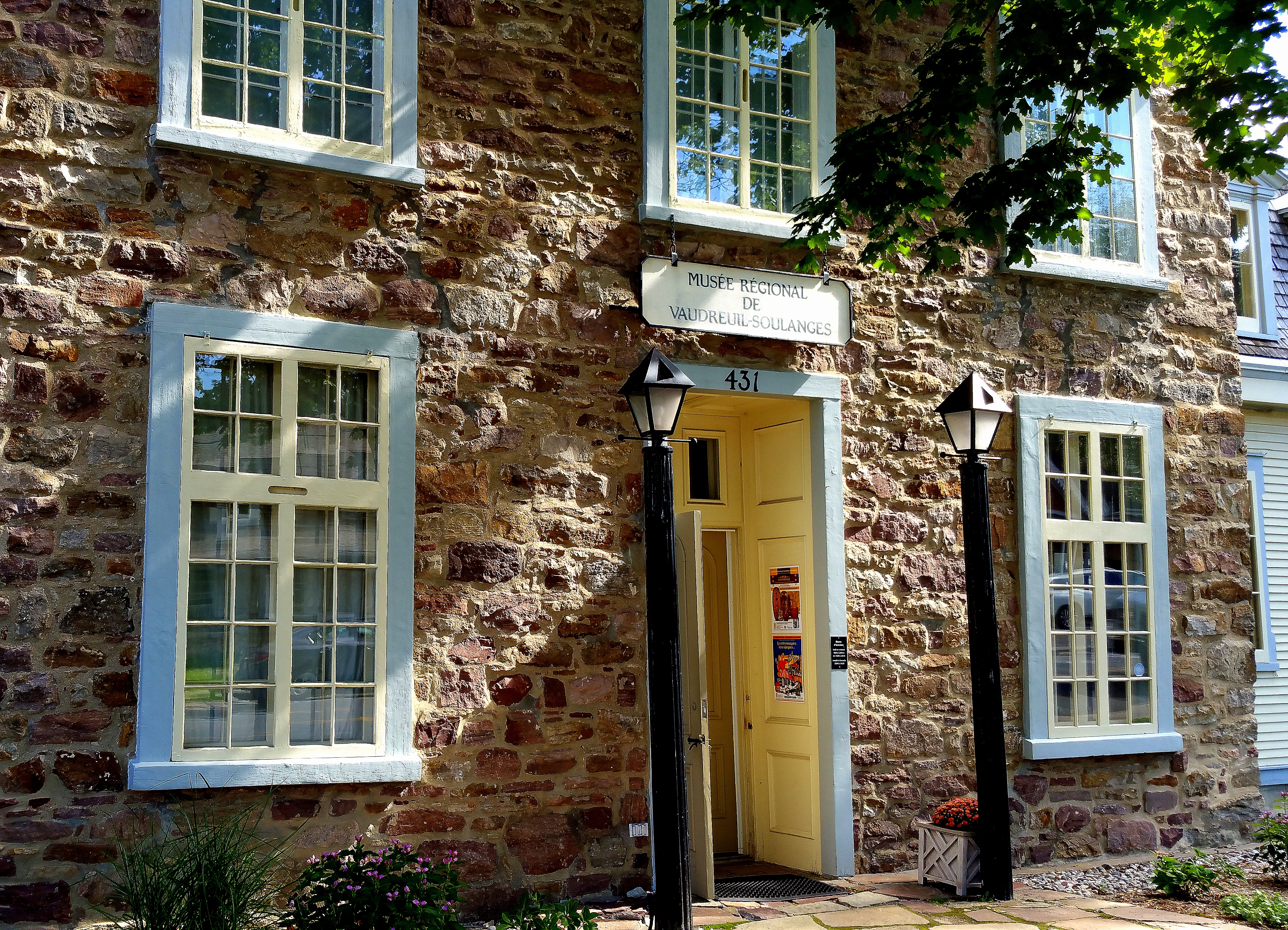
- Entrance of the museum

- Location in Quebec
- Former name: Musée historique de Vaudreuil
- Established: 1953
- Location: 431 Avenue Saint-Charles, Vaudreuil-Dorion, Quebec, Canada
- Coordinates: 45.4°N 74.0167°W
- Type: History and art museum
- Founder: Société historique de Vaudreuil-Soulanges
- Director: vacant
- Curator: Edith Prégent
- Website: www.mrvs.qc.ca

The Musée régional de Vaudreuil-Soulanges is a regional history museum located in Vaudreuil-Dorion, Quebec, Canada. The museum’s mission is to preserve and showcase artifacts of historical, artistic, religious, and sociological importance from the early colonial era to the present day.

== History ==
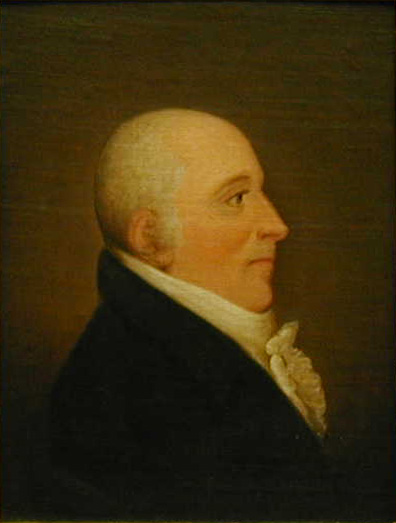
Painting of Gerrit Schipper, collection Musée régional de Vaudreuil-Soulanges.

The museum was founded in 1953 as the Musée historique de l'île Perrot by the Société historique de Vaudreuil-Soulanges. It was originally located in a parish hall in Notre-Dame-de-l'Île-Perrot and inaugurated on August 29, 1953. The museum is one of Quebec's oldest regional museums.

As its collections expanded, the museum relocated to the former Collège Saint-Michel, a building constructed between 1857 and 1859. The museum acquired the building in 1959. With the move, a name change took place. The museum became the Musée historique de Vaudreuil. In 1961, at the urging of Paul Gouin, the building was designated as a cultural heritage site and a classified historic site of Quebec. From 1964 to 1965, the museum conducted restorations and reopened officially on July 18, 1965.

During the 1970s, the collection surpassed 4,000 items and the museum decided to implemented professional standards for collection management. The museum holds a collection of artworks from the region, including a very rare depiction of a votive scene (ex-voto painting on paper from around 1700), Felix Leclerc's first guitar, and masterpieces of the refuge global. Over the next decades, temporary exhibitions featured artists of national importance such as Albert Dumouchel, Stanley Cosgrove, and new discoveries such as the female photographer Germaine St-Denis. In 1979, the museum expanded its facilities under the direction of the museum's co-founder Lucien Thériault.

In 1980, the institution adopted the name Musée régional de Vaudreuil-Soulanges to reflect its broader regional focus. In 1990, its collections were officially recognized as being of national interest by the Quebec Ministry of Cultural Affairs. As of today, the museum houses over 9,500 items.

== Architecture ==
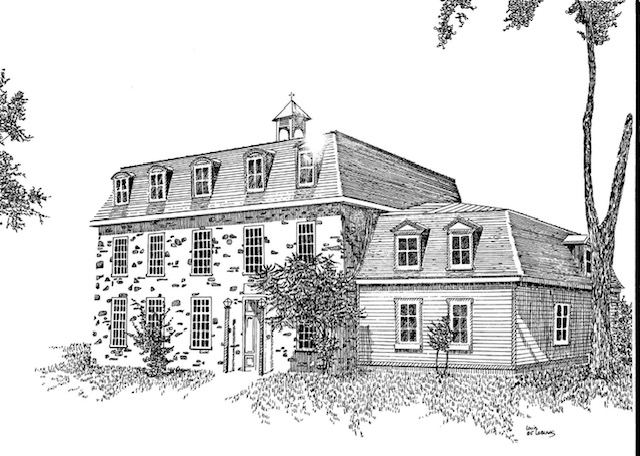
Collège Saint Michel in Old Dorion, condition of 1882

The museum occupies a two-story rectangular stone building with an attic as third floor. It features a four-sided mansard roof covered with cedar shingles. An annex was added in 1882, and a former woodshed is now connected via a corridor. The building has no basement.

Architectural elements of the school building include an attic-style upper level, cruciform muntins in the ground-floor windows, arched dormers, and a small bell tower. In 1979 an expansion in the back of the building was added, designed by architect André Marchand (1931–2012).

== Mission and Collections ==
The museum is dedicated to preserving the region's art de vivre— a French term referring to a refined way of life rooted in cultural traditions and everyday heritage. Its collection highlights everyday life, arts and crafts, and cultural traditions from the French regime to the modern era. A part of the museum is dedicated to the history of the building as former school for boys. Furthermore, the museum shows and sells local artists' works. The museum serves elementary schools and high schools with a broad educational program tailored to Quebec's school curriculum. During the summer months, the museum invites day camps for half-day activities. The museum is listed in the Répertoire Culture-Éducation.

Its collections cover a wide range of themes including:

- Maritime heritage
- Religious art
- Paintings of regional artists
- Literature and music
- First Nations and Inuit history
- Textiles
- Local industries and trades

The museum typically hosts around eight temporary exhibitions and up to fifty cultural events each year. Its educational programs serve over 8,000 students annually.

== Exhibitions ==
The permanent exhibition (currently in French only), located on the upper floor, is divided in two sections:

- Through the Windows of the School – exploring the building's educational history
- Glimpses of Our History – showcasing regional history through selected artifacts

The annual exhibitions with historic context are bilingual since 2024, and display all information in both French and English.

In 2012, the museum inaugurated the Guy-Mauffette room, named in honor of the radio pioneer who contributed to preserving the museum’s building. A second room, dedicated to philanthropist Monique Pilon, shows art exhibitions of local artists and art students. Amother exhibition room in the original building is also dedicated to local art.

== Les Seigneuriales ==
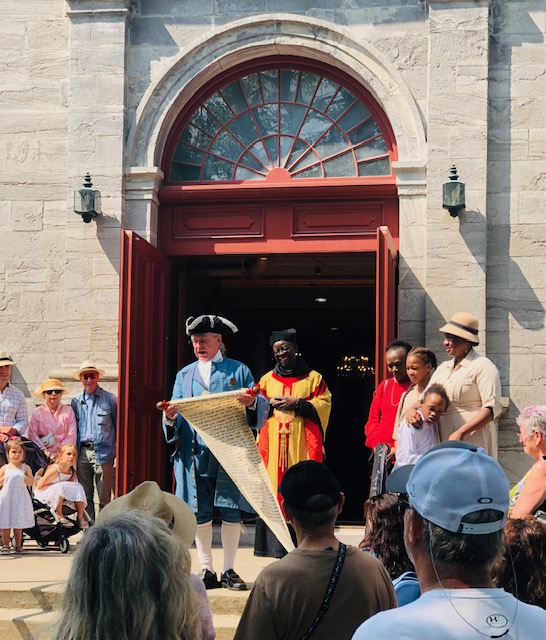
Each year, the town crier announces the news during Les Seigneuriales

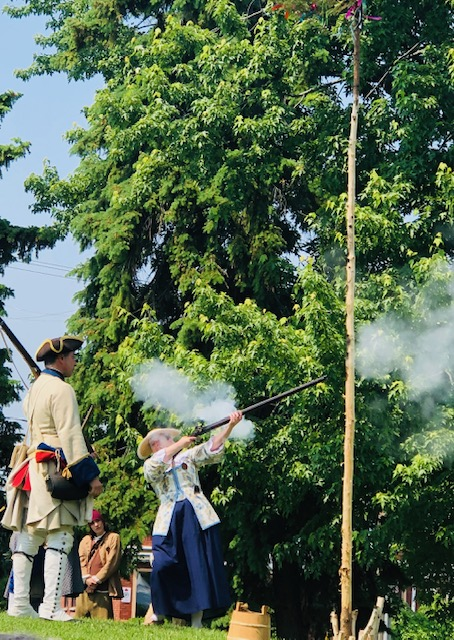
Shooting at the Mai during Les Seigneuriales 2025

From 1992 on the first weekend of June, the museum conducts the history fair known as Les Seigneuriales, featuring a wide variety of reenactments and activities. The fair attracted up to 15,000 visitors over a four-day event. A highlight is the blackening of the Mai, a local tradition in where historical reenactors fire gunpowder at the trunk of a tree. It is believed that the darker the tree becomes, the better the year’s harvest will be. The fair receives both public and private funding, allowing it to remain free of charge for visitors.

== Centre d’archives de Vaudreuil-Soulanges - Historic Archives ==
In 1991, the museum created a second organization, the Centre d'histoire La Presqu'île as an archival research centre. It is first set up on the third floor of the old school building. The Archives hold paper documents concerning the history, genealogy and iconography of the region of Vaudreuil-Soulanges, including the Fonds du Canal Soulanges, the Fonds de la Family Beaujeu, the Fonds Yves Quesnel and the Fonds Henry de Lotbinière-Harwood. In 1997, the archive moved to the museum's ground floor of the 1979 building, and 2024, due to is fast growth, the Centre d’archives de Vaudreuil-Soulanges was relocated to Saint Polycarpe.

In 2000, the Archives Nationales du Québec gave the archives accreditation.

== List of Past Directors ==
- Louise Myette (? - ?)
- Andrée Baileau de Serres (? - ?)
- Lucien Thériault (director/conservator 1960 - 1979)
- Jean Lavoie (1979 - 1983)
- Daniel Bissonnette (1986 - 2024)
- Sebastian Daviau (Jan 2025 - Feb. 2025†)
- Chantal Seguin (interim, Feb. 2025 - Mai 2025)
- Dr Anja Borck (June 2025 - August 2025)
- Michel Forest (current)
