= Thomas Carson =

Thomas or Tom Carson may refer to:

- Thomas Carson (bishop) (1805–1874), Irish Anglican bishop
- Thomas Carson (politician) (1911–?), Northern Irish politician
- Thomas Erskine Carson (1791–1857), American politician from Pennsylvania
- Tom Carson (footballer) (born 1959), Scottish footballer and coach
- Tom Carson (golfer) (c. 1852–?), Scottish golfer
- Tom Carson (field hockey) (born 1990), British field hockey player
