= Hampton L. Carson =

Hampton L. Carson may refer to:

- Hampton L. Carson (lawyer) (1852–1929), Pennsylvania lawyer, state Attorney General
- Hampton L. Carson (biologist) (1914–2004), evolutionary biologist
