= Howard Carson =

Howard Carson can refer to:

- Howard W. Carson (1910–1994), West Virginian state senator
- Howard Carson (American football) (1957–2021), American football linebacker
- Howard Adams Carson (1842–1931), American civil engineer and pioneer of tunnel construction
- H. Carson Graham (1899–1959), Canadian physician
