= Gilbert Carson =

Gilbert Carson may refer to:

- Gilbert Carson (American football) (1901–1988), college football coach
- Gilbert Carson (politician) (1842–1924), Member of Parliament in New Zealand
