= Josephine Carson =

American writer (1919–2002)

- Born: June 21, 1919; Tulsa, Oklahoma, U.S.
- Died: November 2, 2002 (aged 83); San Francisco, California, U.S.
- Education: University of Tulsa; University of California at Los Angeles
- Occupations: Novelist; playwright; short story writer
- Spouse: Mark Rider (divorced)
- Awards: Guggenheim Fellowship (1958)

Josephine Carson (June 21, 1919 – November 2, 2002) was an American writer. A resident of San Francisco, she published three novels – Drives My Green Age (1957), First Man, Last Man (1967), and Where You Goin', Girlie? (1975) – as well as short stories and non-fiction. She also taught subjects such as creative writing at Bennington College, the University of California, Berkeley, and Mills College at Northeastern University.

== Early life and education ==
Josephine Carson was born on June 21, 1919 in Tulsa, Oklahoma. She was the daughter of Helen (nee Neves) and Simpson Mason Carson, a Canadian-born oil operator based in western Kentucky. After she spent some time in New York, she began creative writing while living in San Miguel de Allende. She was educated at the University of Tulsa and, after a years-long break, the University of California at Los Angeles.

== Career ==
She published her first novel, Drives My Green Age in 1957. She won the Stanford University Dramatists' Alliance's 1960 Miles Anderson Award for her then-unpublished play Open Season. A second novel, First Man, Last Man, was published in 1967, and her third novel, Where You Goin', Girlie?, in 1975.

In addition to novels and plays, she also wrote short stories for magazines. She also wrote on African-American women in the civil rights movement with her non-fiction book Silent Voices. By the time of her death, she had also reportedly finished an unpublished book named The Flesh, as well as another one.

After spending time working as a teacher in San Francisco State College (1967-1968) and the Happy Valley School (1969-1970), she later moved to Bennington College in 1971. She also worked at University of California, Berkeley and Mills College at Northeastern University as a writing teacher, and she was a visiting writer at the latter.

== Personal life ==
She married Mark Rider until their divorce; they had no children. A resident of the North Beach neighborhood in San Francisco, she later moved westward to Richmond District.

== Death ==
Carson died on November 2, 2002, in San Francisco, aged 83; she had spent her last few months battling throat and mouth cancer. Her archives are located in the Howard Gotlieb Archival Research Center at Boston University.

== Awards and honors ==
She was a Huntington Hartford Foundation Fellow in 1957. She was awarded a Guggenheim Fellowship in Fiction in 1958. She was awarded a MacDowell Colony fellowship three times, two in 1970 and one in 1971. She was also a Yaddo fellow.
