= Ken Carson (disambiguation) =

Ken Carson (born in 2000) is an American rapper and producer.

Ken Carson may also refer to:

- Ken Carson (country singer) (1914–1994), American singer, songwriter, musician and film performer
- Ken (doll), fashion doll named Kenneth Carson

== See also ==
- Ken Kurson (born in 1968), American political consultant
