= Peter Carson =

Peter Carson may refer to:

- Peter Carson (translator) (1938–2013), English publisher, editor and translator of Russian literature.
- Peter Carson (rugby union) (born 1952), Australian international rugby union player
