= Samuel Carson =

Samuel Carson may refer to:

- Samuel Allen Carson (1870–1949), Alberta politician
- Samuel Price Carson (1798–1838), United States politician
- Samuel Carson (Canadian football) (born 2002), Canadian football player
