= Patricia Carson =

Patricia Mary, Baroness Carson (5 March 1929, Oreston – 13 October 2014, Ghent) was an Anglo-Belgian historian and author.

== Biography ==
Patricia Carson was the daughter of Archibald-Stewart Carson and Hilde-Dorothy (née Clewlow) Carson.

Carson obtained a Bachelor in history at the University of London, followed by a Master of Arts (history) with a thesis on London in the 18th century.

In 1954, she married Raoul Van Caenegem, historian and professor at the University of Ghent; the couple had two sons and a daughter.

After her wedding, she lived permanently in Ghent and made her specialty studying the relations between Great Britain and the Low Countries throughout the centuries. Her most successful book, many times reprinted, was The Fair Face of Flanders.

== Awards and honours ==
- The Eugène Baie Award 1977 (province of Antwerp) for the Fair Face of Flanders.
- On 8 July 1996, Patricia Carson Van Caenegem was made a member of the Belgian nobility, with the personal title of Baroness.

== Publications ==
- "The Building of the first Bridge at Westminster", Journal of Transport History 3/2 (1957).
- Guide to Materials for West African History in the Archives of Belgium and Holland, (London, 1962).
- Guide to the Materials for West African History in French Archives, (London, 1968).
- The Fair Face of Flanders, (Ghent, 1969); reprinted 1969, 3rd revised edition 1974, for which she received the Baie prize; with a Dutch translation in 1977, a German in 1982 and a Bulgarian in 1984. A French translation by Mady Buysse, Le Miroir de la Flandre, appeared in 1973.
- "The British Connection", Handelingen der Maatschappij voor Geschiedenis en Oudheidkunde te Gent, nieuwe reeks, 28 (1974); translated as "Britten en Vlamingen", Neerlandia, 1975, nr. 1; and "Vlaanderen en Nederland vanuit een Brits standpunt gezien", Ons Erfdeel, 13/3 (1970).
- With Gaby Danhieux:
  - Ghent, a town for all seasons, (Ghent, 1972); translated as:
  - Gent, een stad van alle tijden, 2nd ed., (Ghent, 1977).
  - Gand, ville de tous temps, (Ghent, 1972).
  - Gent, eine Stadt aus allen Zeiten, (Ghent, 1975); illustrated by Godelieve de Schrijver.
- James Van Artevelde : The man from Ghent, (1980).
- Flanders in Creative Contrasts, (1989); translated by H. Brondeel as
  - In Eindeloze Verscheidenheid: een historisch fresco van Vlaanderen, Lannoo and Davidsfonds.
- A new revised edition of The Fair Face of Flanders, in 4 languages including a new translation into Dutch was published in 1991 and republished in 1995 and 1997.
- A new revised Dutch edition of Gent, een stad van alle tijden, Lannoo, (Tielt, 1992).
- A translation into Dutch by Marijke Brutsaert of James Van Artevelde, Davidsfonds, (1996).
