= David Carson =

David Carson may refer to:

- David Carson (graphic designer) (born 1955), American graphic designer
- David Carson (director), British television director
- David Carson (climatologist), British climatologist
- David Carson (footballer) (born 1995), English footballer
