= Gary Carson =

American poker player and author (1949–2014)

- Born: April 27, 1949; Austin, Texas, U.S.
- Died: March 4, 2014 (aged 64); Wichita, Kansas, U.S.
- Education: Louisiana State University; Northwestern University; Sam Houston State University
- Writing career
- Genre: Nonfiction
- Subjects: Poker, gambling, probability
- Website: garycarson.blogspot.com

Gary Lavon Carson (April 27, 1949 – March 4, 2014) was the author of The Complete Book of Hold 'Em Poker, The Complete Book of Casino Poker, and multiple articles and essays focusing on poker, gambling, and probability. He was a frequent contributor to the newsgroup rec.gambling.poker. Several of Carson's unorthodox strategies remain topics of fierce debate years after first being published.

== Biography ==
Born in Austin, Texas, Carson held an MS in Quantitative Business Methods from LSU, an MS in Industrial Engineering and Management Science from Northwestern and an ABD in Criminal Justice from Sam Houston State University. He taught in the business schools of LSU, Loyola University (Chicago), University of Illinois (Chicago Circle), and Sam Houston State University.

He often took a contrarian view of strategic decision making. His writings emphasized that the loose versus tight conditions of a game are a strong driving force in evaluating a situation. In intermediate betting rounds in loose games, he opined it is often more valuable to play a good draw strongly than to do so with the current best hand, while in tighter games the opposite is often the case.

His books and recent gambling related writings have been on poker, although he wrote on horse handicapping in the 1980s. He also wrote on a wide range of non-gambling topics ranging from human resource topics to commercial snail farming.

Carson wrote about gambling for CardPlayer, Poker Digest, American Turf Monthly, Racing Star Weekly, and websites Pokerpages.com, Pokermagazine.com, Pokerhands.com, and Gaminglinks.com. He was also a prolific blogger and blogged about poker, mathematics as it relates to poker, and culture and politics.

Carson lived in Wichita, Kansas.

He died at his home on March 4, 2014, of vascular and renal disease.
