= Scott Patrick Carson =

- Occupations: Business executive, Microbiologist

Scott Patrick Carson is an American microbiologist and a serial entrepreneur in the medical supply field.

== Career ==
Carson started his career studying microbiology from Colorado State University in 1985.

In 1996, he founded US Medical which became the first internet distributor of previously owned Capital Medical Equipment (CME). This company was named among Inc's 500 fastest growing companies.

In 2002, he founded Med1Online, another medical supply company of reconditioned equipment as well as CME.

Carson is also the President of Aesthetic and Cosmetic Business Association, a non-profit dedicated to advocacy and research and the founder of MedRepPro that connects vendors with sales representatives. His other affiliations include CEG, GmbH, Healthcare Investment Advisors, Quanta Aesthetic Lasers and Mankwitz Kurtz Investments.

Carson is a team Member developing eBay Healthcare Pricing/Category Platform. He negotiated and completed the first eBay Live Auction Agreement for Business and Industry Category and developed one of the first Business and Industrial Listing Tools on eBay/Amazon synchronizing inventory across multiple selling channels.

== Awards ==
- Micro Enterprise Hall of Fame Recipient
- Great Entrepreneur Speaker Series
- The Inc. 500: America’s Fastest Growing Private Companies
- 2 X Recipient; Entrepreneur Hot 100
- 2 X Finalist; Ernst & Young Entrepreneur Of The Year
- ASPS American Society of Plastic Surgeons-Best of Hot Topics Speaker
