= Willie Carson (disambiguation) =

Willie Carson (born 1942) is a Scottish jockey.

Willie Carson may also refer to:

- Willie Carson (photo journalist) (1926–1996), Northern Irish photo journalist
- Willie Carson (soccer), Scottish-American soccer player

== See also ==
- William Carson (disambiguation), a disambiguation page for William Carson
