= Jack Carson (disambiguation) =

Jack Carson may refer to:

- Jack Carson (1910–1963; born John Elmer Carson), Canadian-American actor
- Jack Carson (cricketer) (born 2000), English cricketer
- The Jack Carson Show (1949–1956), an American radio variety show

== See also ==
- Jackie Carson (born 1978), American basketball coach
- John Carson (disambiguation)
