= Jim Carson =

Scottish footballer

Personal information
- Full name: James Carson
- Date of birth: 1912
- Place of birth: Clydebank, Scotland
- Height: 5 ft 3 in (1.60 m)
- Position: Winger

Senior career*
Years	Team	Apps	(Gls)
1933–1934	Bradford Park Avenue	12	(0)
1934–1936	Crystal Palace	52	(17)
1936–1937	Burnley	6	(0)
1937–19xx	Alloa Athletic		
- * Club domestic league appearances and goals

James Carson (1912 – date of death unknown) was a Scottish professional footballer who played as a winger. He was born in Clydebank, near Glasgow, and played 70 matches in the Football League for Bradford Park Avenue, Crystal Palace and Burnley.
