= Senator Carson =

Senator Carson may refer to:

- Howard W. Carson (1910–1994), West Virginia State Senate
- James Harvey Carson (1808–1884), Virginia State Senate
- John Carson (Colorado politician) (fl. 2020s), Colorado State Senate
- Julia Carson (1938–2007), Indiana State Senate
- Samuel Price Carson (1798–1838), North Carolina State Senate
- Sharon Carson (born 1957), New Hampshire State Senate
- Wallace P. Carson Jr. (born 1934), Oregon State Senate
- William A. Carson (1863–1949), New York State Senate
