= Dennis A. Carson =

American physician and hematologist

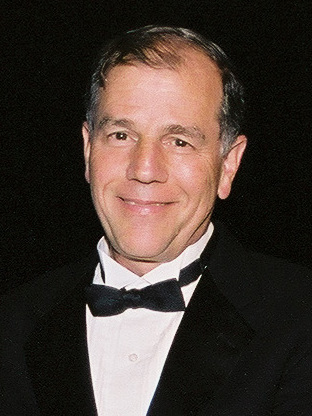
Dennis A. Carson

Dennis Anthony Carson is an American physician and hematologist credited as co-discoverer of the CpG adjuvant that is used for hepatitis vaccination. He is a member of the National Academy of Sciences and the 2002 recipient of the International Rheumatology Award from the Japan Rheumatism Association. From 2003 to 2007 he was associate dean for health sciences at the University of California San Diego.
