= General Carson =

General Carson may refer to:

- Charles Frederick Carson (1886–1960), British Army brigadier general
- James Harvey Carson (1808–1884), Virginia Militia brigadier general in the American Civil War
- John Miller Carson Jr. (1864–1956), U.S. Army brigadier general
- Kit Carson (1809–1868), U.S. Army brevet brigadier general

== See also ==
- Attorney General Carson (disambiguation)
