= Tarik Carson =

Uruguayan-born Argentine writer and painter

Tarik Carson da Silva (Rivera, Uruguay, 23 August 1946 - Argentina, 29 September 2014) was a Uruguayan-born writer and painter, active in Argentina.

== Work ==
=== Novels ===
- Una pequeña soledad (Filofalsía, Buenos Aires, 1986)
- El estado superior de la materia (Buenos Aires, 1989)
- Ganadores (Proyección, Montevideo, 1991)
- Océanos de néctar (Axxón, Buenos Aires, 1992)

=== Short stories ===
- El hombre olvidado (Géminis, Montevideo, 1973)
- El corazón reversible (Monte Sexto, Montevideo, 1986)
