= Michael Carson =

Michael Carson may refer to:

- Michael Carson (author) (born 1946), pen name of British author Michael Wherly
- Michael Carson (television director) (1947–2005), Australian television director
- Michael Bear Carson and Suzan Carson, serial killers
