= Attorney General Carson =

Attorney General Carson may refer to:

- James H. Carson Jr. (1935–2015), North Carolina Attorney General
- Hampton L. Carson (lawyer) (1852–1929), Attorney General of Pennsylvania
- Edward Carson (1854–1935), Attorney General for England and Wales

== See also ==
- General Carson (disambiguation)
