= Donald "Tee" Carson =

American jazz musician (1929–2000)

Donald Tecumseh "Tee" Carson (1929–2000) was an American jazz pianist who played in Count Basie's big band after Basie died in 1984.

== Early life ==
Carson was born in Washington, D.C., in 1929, where he attended Armstrong High School.

== Career ==
By the 1950s, Carson had accompanied Ethel Waters and Ella Fitzgerald on piano. From the 1950s to the 1970s, Carson performed with Fitzgerald, Joe Williams, Sarah Vaughan, Nancy Wilson, Pearl Bailey and Tony Bennett, among others. He began filling in for Count Basie when Basie began experiencing health problems in the late 1970s, and took over as the pianist of the Count Basie Orchestra following Basie's 1984 death. In the late 1980s, in addition to recording with the Basie band, Carson recorded with saxophonists Frank Wess and Richie Cole. In 1985, John S. Wilson wrote in the New York Times that Carson "manages to suggest Mr. Basie's manner without adopting it, using single-note lines that are a variant of Mr. Basie's lines, and dropping gentle but propitious chords behind the soloists."

== Death ==
Carson died in 2000 of lung cancer, at the age of 70, at his home in Cedar Park, Texas.
