= Jo Carson =

American writer (1946–2011)

Josephine Catron Carson
- Born: October 9, 1946; Johnson City, Tennessee, US
- Died: September 20, 2011 (aged 64); Johnson City, Tennessee, US
- Occupation: Writer, Storyteller
- Language: English
- Notable awards: Kesselring Prize

Josephine Catron Carson (October 9, 1946 – September 19, 2011) was an American playwright, poet, fiction writer, and actor, as well as the author of three children's books. Her best-known play is Daytrips (1991), and her poetry is collected in Stories I Ain't Told Nobody Yet (1989). Her story collection The Last of the "Waltz Across Texas" was published in 1993.

== Biography ==
Carson was born in Johnson City, Tennessee, in 1946 and received degrees in theater and speech from East Tennessee State University in 1973. She lived in Johnson City. Her books Liars, Thieves and Other Sinners on the Bench, Spider Speculations: A Physics and Biophysics of Storytelling, and Stories I Ain't Told Nobody Yet were published by Theater Communications Group. The Teller Tales: Histories, from Ohio University Press, includes two stories from the American Revolutionary period written for storytellers. The stories are particularly relevant to East Tennessee and Western North Carolina.

Carson also has a collection of short stories, The Last of the Waltz Across Texas, from Gnomon Press. Her 1989 play Daytrips won the Kesselring Prize in that year. Preacher With a Horse to Ride is included in the anthology Alternate ROOTS: Plays from the Southern Theater edited by Kathie deNobriga and Valetta Anderson from Heinemann Books. Her plays have been produced widely in the United States. For almost twenty years, she worked with communities to create plays made from stories collected in those communities; she may have been the most commissioned playwright in this country. Information about the community work can be found in Spider Speculations and Liars, Thieves.

Carson's books for children are Pulling My Leg (1990), You Hold Me and I'll Hold You (1992), and The Great Shaking (1994), all published by Orchard Books. The Great Shaking is an eyewitness account of the 1811–12 New Madrid earthquakes, as told by a fictional bear.

She is anthologized widely. She was an occasional commentator on NPR's All Things Considered for several years. She also was a founding member of Alternate ROOTS.

Carson died September 19, 2011, in Johnson City.
