= Alex Carson =

Canadian gridiron football player (1923–1981)

- Born: October 26, 1923; Windsor, Ontario, Canada
- Died: August 3, 1981 (aged 57); Palm Beach, Florida, U.S.
- Other name: "The Murderous Ax"
- Spouses: Carol Channing (m. 1950; div. 1956); Mary Jane Haskin Fenton (m. 1965; div. 1965)
- Football career

Profile
- Positions: Centre, Guard

Personal information
- Listed height: 6 ft 0 in (1.83 m)
- Listed weight: 210 lb (95 kg)

Career history
- 1949–1951: Ottawa Rough Riders

Awards and highlights
- Grey Cup champion (1951)

Alexander Chorostkowski, known as Alex Carson, (October 26, 1923 – August 3, 1981), was a Canadian football player who played for the Ottawa Rough Riders. He won the Grey Cup with them in 1951.

Carson was raised in Windsor, Ontario and previously attended and played football at the Kennedy Collegiate Institute and for the junior Windsor Rockets. He briefly played for the Los Angeles Bulldogs of the Pacific Coast Professional Football League.

During his time in California, Carson married Carol Channing in 1950. They had one son named Channing Carson, who later adopted his stepfather's surname (Lowe). Carson and Channing divorced in 1956.

He worked as a private detective in New York City after his football career. In 1962, he was living in Fort Lauderdale, Florida. He later married Mary Jane Haskin Fenton in 1965; that marriage lasted only 63 days.

Carson died in Palm Beach, Florida on August 3, 1981.
