= Bill Carson =

Bill Carson may refer to:

- Bill Carson (ice hockey) (1900–1967), Canadian Stanley Cup winning ice hockey player
- Bill Carson (musician) (1926–2007), American Western swing guitarist from California
- Bill Carson (sportsman) (1916–1944), New Zealand cricketer and rugby union footballer
- Bill Carson (rugby league) (1932–1985), Australian rugby league footballer
- "Lightning" Bill Carson, a fictional character portrayed by actor Tim McCoy in a series of films, see Straight Shooter
- Bill Carson (film character), a character in The Good, the Bad and the Ugly
- pseudonym of Fred Olen Ray (born 1954), American film director

== See also ==
- William Carson (disambiguation)
