= Carson (given name) =

- Pronunciation: /ˈkɑːrsən/
- Gender: Unisex (primarily male)
- Language: English

Origin
- Languages: Irish, Gaelic, Scottish and English
- Origin: Carson (surname)
- Meaning: "son of Carr"
- Region of origin: Scotland; Ireland

Other names
- Variant forms: Carsen; Karson
- Related names: Carrie

Carson is a unisex given name, originating from a Scottish and Irish surname of unknown meaning.

== People ==
=== A ===
- Carson Allen (born 1995), American singer-songwriter

=== B ===
- Carson Beck (born 2002), American football player
- Carson W. Beck (born 1962), American politician
- Carson Benge (born 2003), American baseball player
- Carson Bigbee (1895–1964), American baseball player
- Carson Bjarnason (born 2005), Canadian ice hockey player
- Carson Blair (born 1989), American baseball player
- Carson Block (born 1977), American investor
- Carson Bolemon (born 2007), American baseball player
- Carson Boren (1824–1912), American pioneer
- Carson Branstine (born 2000), Canadian-American tennis player
- Carson Brewer (1920–2003), American journalist
- Carson Brown (born 2008), American stock car racing driver
- Carson Bruener (born 2001), American football player
- Carson Buschman-Dormond (born 2002), Canadian soccer player

=== C ===
- Carson Carels (born 2008), Canadian ice hockey player
- Carson Chamberlain (born 1964), American songwriter
- Carson Charles, Trinidadian politician
- Carson Cistulli (born 1979), American poet
- Carson Clark (born 1989), American volleyball player
- Carson Clough (born 1994), American Paralympic triathlete
- Carson Coffman (born 1988), American football player
- Carson Cole (born 1965), Canadian singer
- Carson Conklin (born 2004), American football player
- Carson Cooman (born 1982), American composer
- Carson Cooper (1897–1955), Canadian ice hockey player
- Carson Cooper (basketball) (born 2004), American basketball player
- Carson Cunningham (born 1977), American basketball coach

=== D ===
- Carson Dach (born 1980), American football player
- Carson Daly (born 1973), American television host
- Carson Davidson (1924–2016), American filmmaker

=== E ===
- Carson Ebanks (born 1956), Caymanian sailor
- Carson Ellis (born 1975), American illustrator
- Carson Etter (born 2004), American stock car racing driver

=== F ===
- Carson Fagan (born 1982), Caymanian footballer
- Carson Ferguson (born 2000), American dirt racing driver
- Carson Foster (born 2001), American swimmer
- Carson Fox (born 1970), American artist
- Carson Fulmer (born 1993), American baseball player

=== G ===
- Carson Grant (born 1950), American actor
- Carson Gulley (1897–1962), American academic administrator

=== H ===
- Carson Haislip (born 2008/2009), American stock car racing driver
- Carson Hansen (born 2003), American football player
- Carson Hinzman (born 2004), American football player
- Carson Hocevar (born 2003), American stock car racing driver
- Carson Huey-You (born 2002), American child prodigy

=== J ===
- Carson D. Jeffries (1922–1995), American physicist
- Carson Johnson (born 2006), American basketball player
- Carson Jones (1986–2025), American boxer
- Carson Jorgensen (born 1989), American politician

=== K ===
- Karson Kendall (born 2000), American soccer player
- Carson Kelly (born 1994), American baseball player
- Carson Kievman (1949–2021), American music composer
- Carson Klein (born 2002), American soccer player
- Carson Kreitzer, American playwright
- Carson Kressley (born 1969), American fashion expert
- Carson Kvapil (born 2003), American stock car racing driver
- Karson Kuhlman (born 1995), American professional ice hockey player

=== L ===
- Carson Lambos (born 2003), Canadian ice hockey player
- Carson Loftin (born 2008), American stock car racing driver
- Carson Long (born 1954), American football player

=== M ===
- Carson MacCormac (born 1999), Canadian actor
- Carson Mattern (born 2004), Canadian cyclist
- Carson McCullers (1917–1967), American writer
- Carson McCullough (born 2005), Irish cricketer
- Carson McCusker (born 1998), American baseball player
- Carson McHone (born 1992), American singer-songwriter
- Carson McMillan (born 1988), Canadian ice hockey player
- Carson Meier (born 1995), American football player
- Carson Meyer (born 1997), American ice hockey player
- Carson Millar, Saint Lucian football manager
- Carson Miller (cyclist) (born 1989), American cyclist
- Carson K. Miller, American academic administrator
- Carson Morrison (1902–1993), American professor

=== P ===
- Carson Palmer (born 1979), American football player
- Carson Palmquist (born 2000), American baseball player
- Carson Parks (1936–2005), American songwriter
- Carson Pickett (born 1993), American soccer player

=== R ===
- Carson Ragsdale (born 1998), American baseball player
- Carson Rehkopf (born 2005), Canadian ice hockey player
- Carson Abel Roberts (1905–1983), American lieutenant general
- Carson Robison (1890–1957), American singer-songwriter
- Carson Roccaforte (born 2002), American baseball player
- Carson Rockhill (born 1990), Canadian American football player
- Carson Rogers (1924–2005), American politician
- Carson Ross (born 1946), American politician

=== S ===
- Carson Schwesinger (born 2003), American football player
- Karson Sharar (born 2003), American football player
- Carson Sigrah (born 1960), Micronesian politician
- Carson Smith (disambiguation), multiple people
- Carson Soucy (born 1994), Canadian ice hockey player
- Carson Spiers (born 1997), American baseball player
- Carson Steele (born 2002), American football player
- Carson Strong (born 1999), American football player

=== T ===
- Carson Tanguilig (born 2003), American tennis player
- Carson Tinker (born 1989), American football player
- Carson Towt (born 2001), American football player
- Carson Tyler (born 2004), American diver

=== V ===
- Carson Van Osten (1945–2015), American musician
- Carson Vinson (born 2001), American football player
- Carson Vitale (born 1988), Canadian baseball coach
- Carson Vom Steeg (born 1999), American soccer player

=== W ===
- Carson Walch (born 1978), American football coach
- Carson Ware (born 2000), American stock car racing driver
- Carson Fordham Wells Jr. (1880–1956), American architect
- Carson Wen (born 1953), Hong Kong businessman
- Carson Wentz (born 1992), American football player
- Carson Wetsch (born 2006), Canadian ice hockey player
- Carson Whisenhunt (born 2000), American baseball player
- Carson Whitsett (1945–2007), American keyboardist
- Carson Wiggins (born 2005), American baseball player
- Carson Wiggs (born 1990), American football player
- Carson Williams (disambiguation), multiple people

=== Y ===
- Carson Yeung (born 1960), Hong Kong businessman

== Fictional characters ==
- Carson Beckett, from the TV series Stargate Atlantis
- Carson Drew, from Nancy Drew
- Carson Phillips, from the film Struck by Lightning

== See also ==
- Carson (disambiguation), a disambiguation page for Carson
- Carson (surname), people with the surname Carson
