= Carson =

Carson may refer to:

== People and fictional characters ==
- Carson (surname), a list people and fictional characters with the surname
- Carson (given name), a list of people with the given name

== Places ==
=== United States ===
- Carson, California, a city
- Carson Township, Fayette County, Illinois
- Carson, Iowa, a city
- Carson, Kentucky, an unincorporated community
- Carson City, Michigan
- Carson Township, Minnesota
- Carson, Mississippi, an unincorporated community
- Carson, Missouri, a ghost town
- Carson City, Nevada, the state capital located in Northern Nevada
- Carson, New Mexico, an unincorporated community
- Carson, North Dakota, a city
- Carson, Oregon, an unincorporated community
- Carson County, Texas
- Carson, Washington, an unincorporated community
- Carson, Wisconsin, a town
- Fort Carson, Colorado, a United States Army post
- Carson Beach, South Boston, Massachusetts, a public beach
- Carson Desert, Nevada
- Carson National Forest, New Mexico
- Carson Park (Eau Claire, Wisconsin)
- Carson Pass, through the Sierra Nevada in California
- Carson Range, a mountain range in California and Nevada
- Carson River, in California and Nevada
- Carson Sink, a large playa in Nevada
- Carson Valley, Pennsylvania, an unincorporated community

=== Elsewhere ===
- Carson Lake (disambiguation), various lakes in the United States and Canada
- Carson River (Western Australia), Australia
- Mount Carson, a subpeak of Pavilion Mountain, British Columbia, Canada
- Mount Carson (Antarctica), in the Southern Cross Mountains, Antarctica
- 6572 Carson, an asteroid

== Businesses ==
- Carson's, an American retailer
- Carson Helicopters, an American heavy lift helicopter company
- Carson Productions, a television production company established by Johnny Carson

== Schools ==
- Carson College of Business, the business school of Washington State University in Pullman, Washington
- Carson High School (disambiguation)
- Carson College for Orphan Girls, Flourtown, Pennsylvania, now coeducational and named Carson Valley Children's Aid
- Carson Middle School, Pittsburgh, Pennsylvania
- Carson Elementary School (disambiguation)

== Transportation ==
- Carson (Los Angeles Metro station)
- Carson (LYNX station), Charlotte, North Carolina

== Other uses ==
- Carson (band), a 1970s Australian blues rock and boogie rock band
- Carson?, a record by the Gaelic punk group Oi Polloi
- Carson top, an after-market car-top

== See also ==
- Carson House (disambiguation)
- Carsen
