= Carsen =

Carsen is both a surname and a given name. Notable people with the name include:

== Surname ==
- Robert Carsen (born 1954), Canadian opera director
- Walter Carsen (1912–2012), Canadian businessman and philanthropist
  - Walter Carsen Centre, headquarters of the National Ballet of Canada in Toronto, Ontario, Canada

== Given name ==
- Carsen Edwards (born 1998), American basketball player
- Carsen Germyn (born 1982), Canadian ice hockey player
- Carsen Gray, Canadian actress and singer
- Carsen Ryan (born 2003), American football player
- Carsen Stringer, American computational neuroscientist
- Carsen Twarynski (born 1997), Canadian professional ice hockey player

== Fictional characters ==
- Flynn Carsen of The Librarian franchise

== See also ==
- Carson (disambiguation)
