= King's Landing =

King's Landing can refer to:

- King's Landing (A Song of Ice and Fire), capital of the Seven Kingdoms in the George R. R. Martin's fantasy series A Song of Ice and Fire and its TV adaptation Game of Thrones
- King's Landing, luxury condominium in Toronto which houses the Walter Carsen Centre and was designed by Arthur Erickson
- Kings Landing Historical Settlement, historic area in New Brunswick, Canada
