= Carson Fordham Wells Jr. =

American architect

- Born: May 13, 1880
- Died: August 30, 1956
- Resting place
- Education: Utah State University
- Occupation: Architect

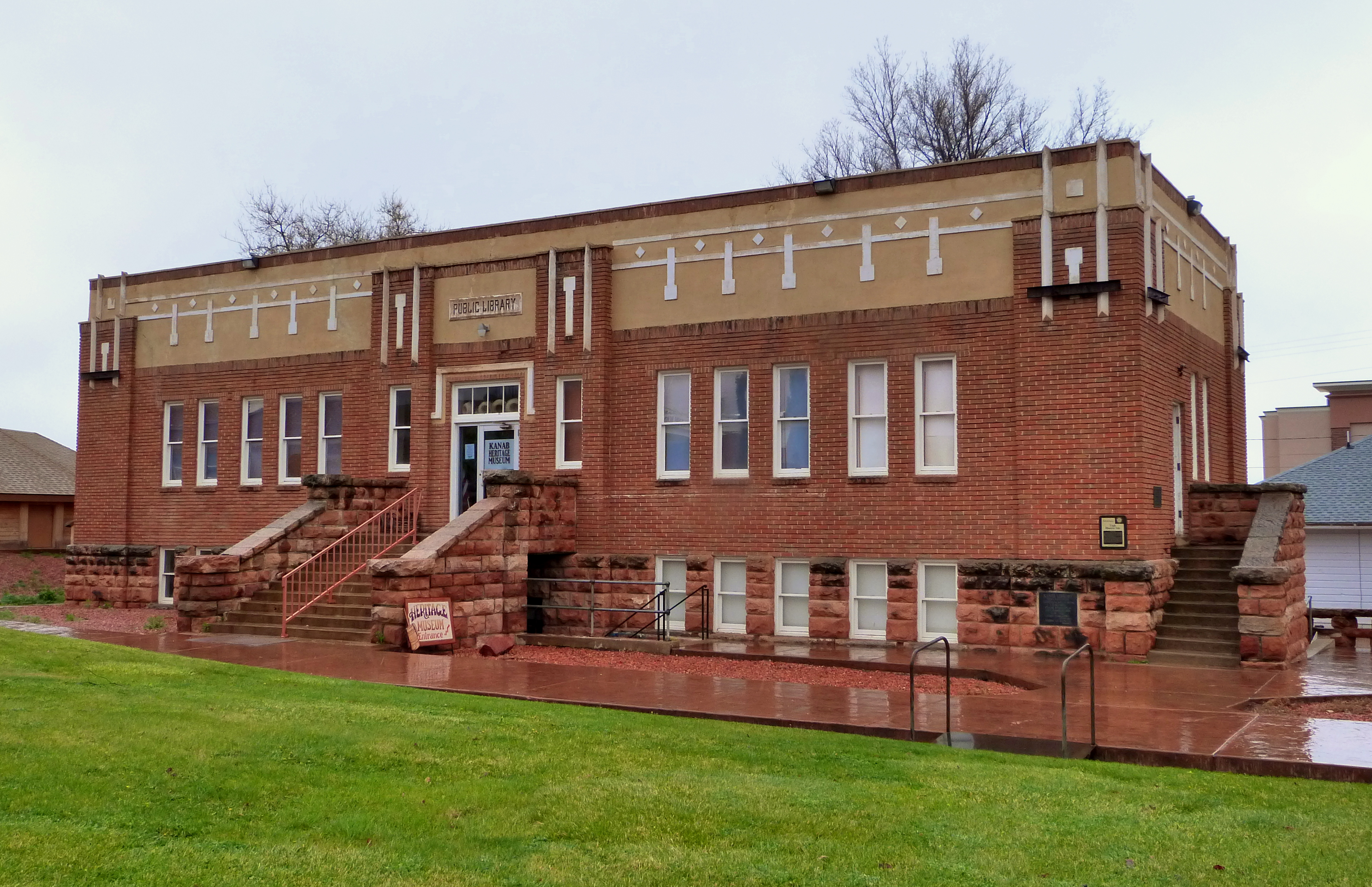
The Kanab Library

Carson Fordham Wells Jr. (May 13, 1880 – August 30, 1956) was an American architect who designed buildings in the state of Utah, including the NRHP-listed Kanab Library.

Works include (probably, some yet to be confirmed):

- Box Elder County Courthouse, 1 N. Main St. Brigham City, UT (Wells, Carson), NRHP-listed9
- Brigham City Fire Station/City Hall, 6 N. Main St. Brigham City, UT (Wells, Carson F.), NRHP-listed
- Kanab Library, 600 South 100 E. Kanab, UT (Wells, Carson F. Jr.), NRHP-listed
- Howard Hotel (1914 remodelling of 1903 building), 35 S. Main St. Brigham City, UT (Wells, C. F.), NRHP-listed
