= Kanab Library =

- U.S. National Register of Historic Places
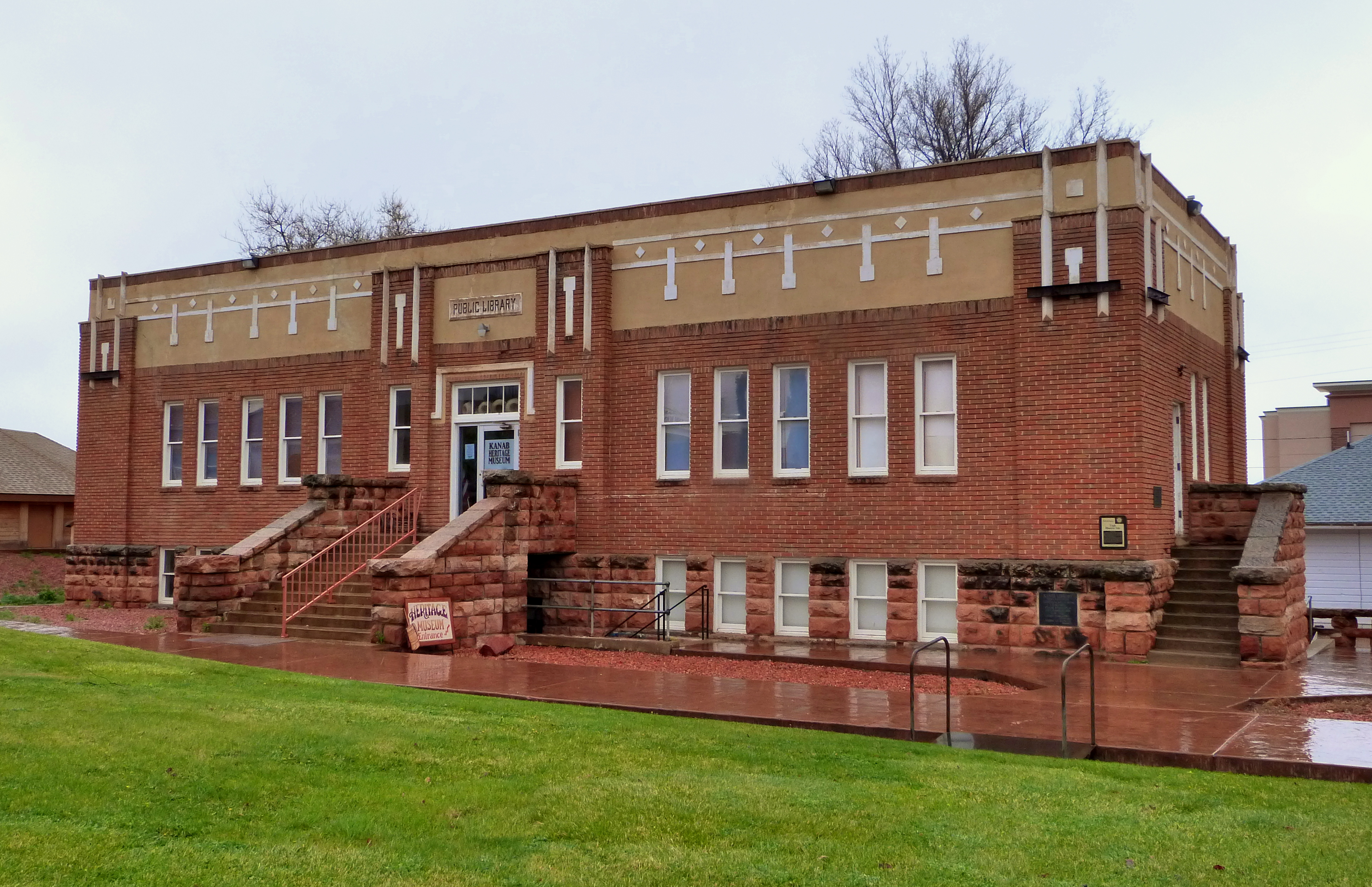
- The library in 2017

- Location within Utah Location within the United States
- Location: 600 South 100 East, Kanab, Utah
- Coordinates: 37°02′55″N 112°31′15″W
- Area: less than one acre
- Built: 1939
- Built by: Mark E. Pope
- Architect: Carson Fordham Wells, Jr.
- Architectural style: Prairie School, Art Deco
- MPS: Public Works Buildings TR
- NRHP reference No.: 95001067
- Added to NRHP: September 7, 1995

The Kanab Library is a historic building in Kanab, Utah. It was built by Mark E. Pope in 1939-1940 as a Works Progress Administration project to house the public library initially established in 1915, and designed in the Prairie School and Art Deco styles by architect Carson Fordham Wells, Jr. It has been listed on the National Register of Historic Places since September 7, 1995. Since 2023, the building has housed the Kanab Museum, which interprets the cultural and historical development of Kanab and Kane County region.
