= Convertible =

Vehicle with a folding or removable roof

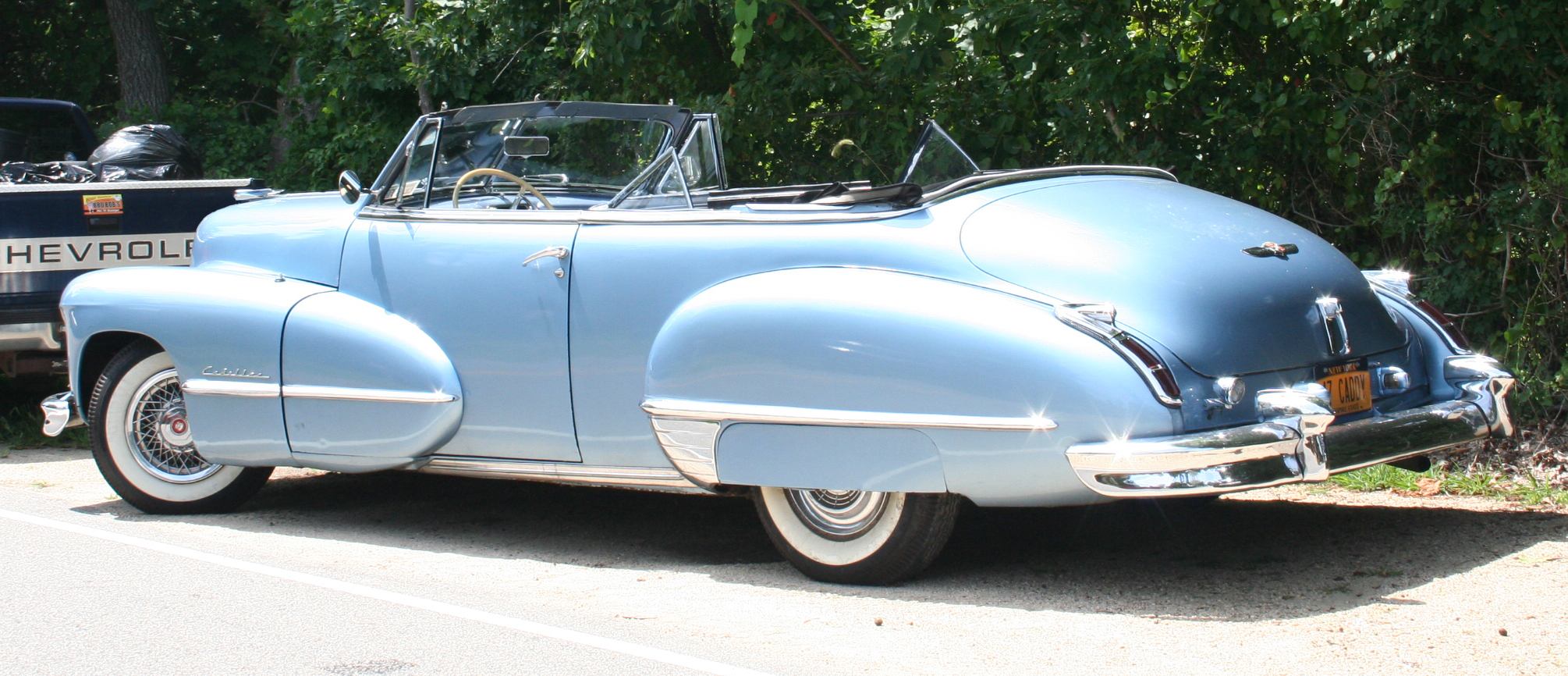
1947 Cadillac convertible

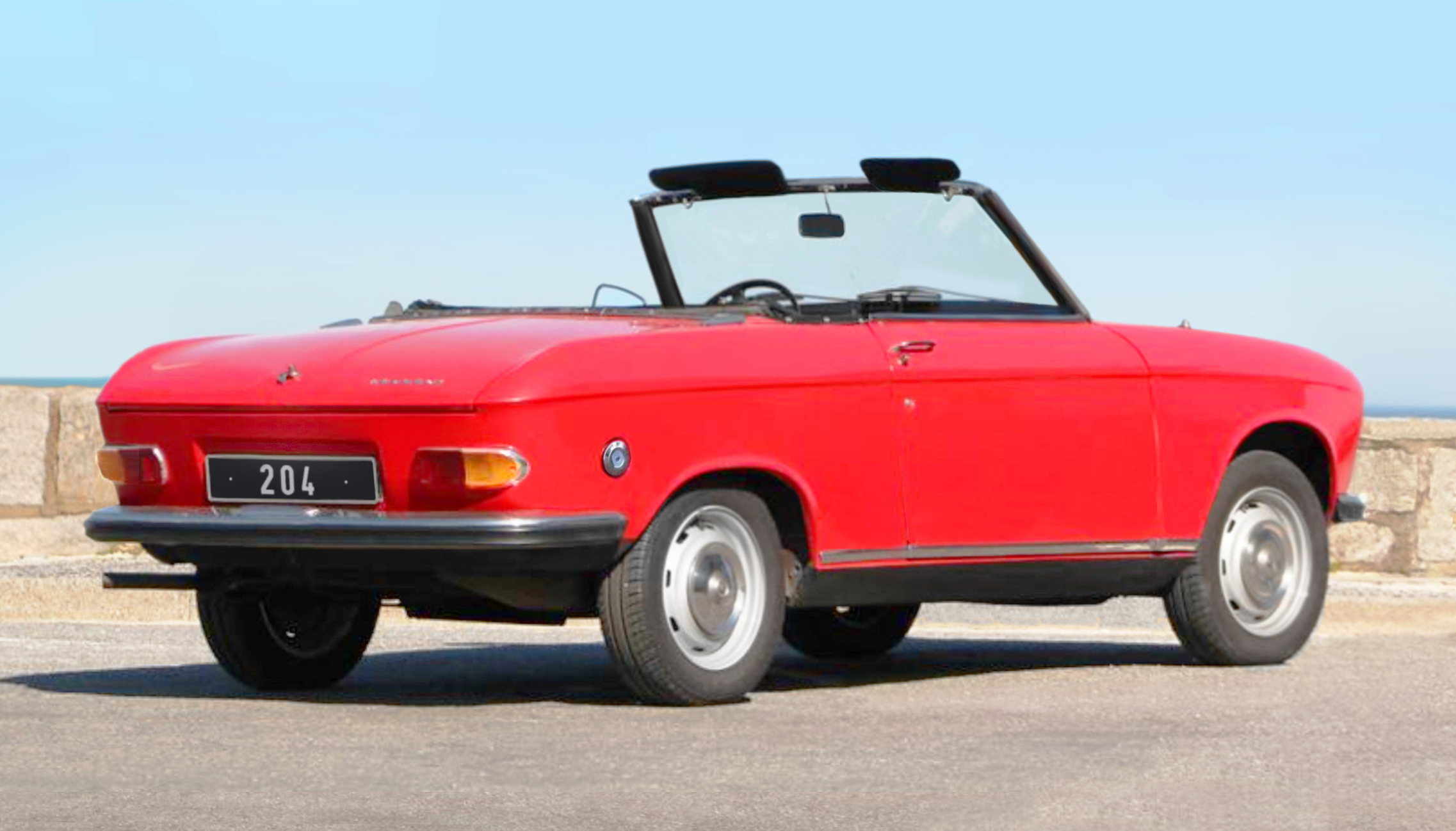
1968 Peugeot 204 convertible

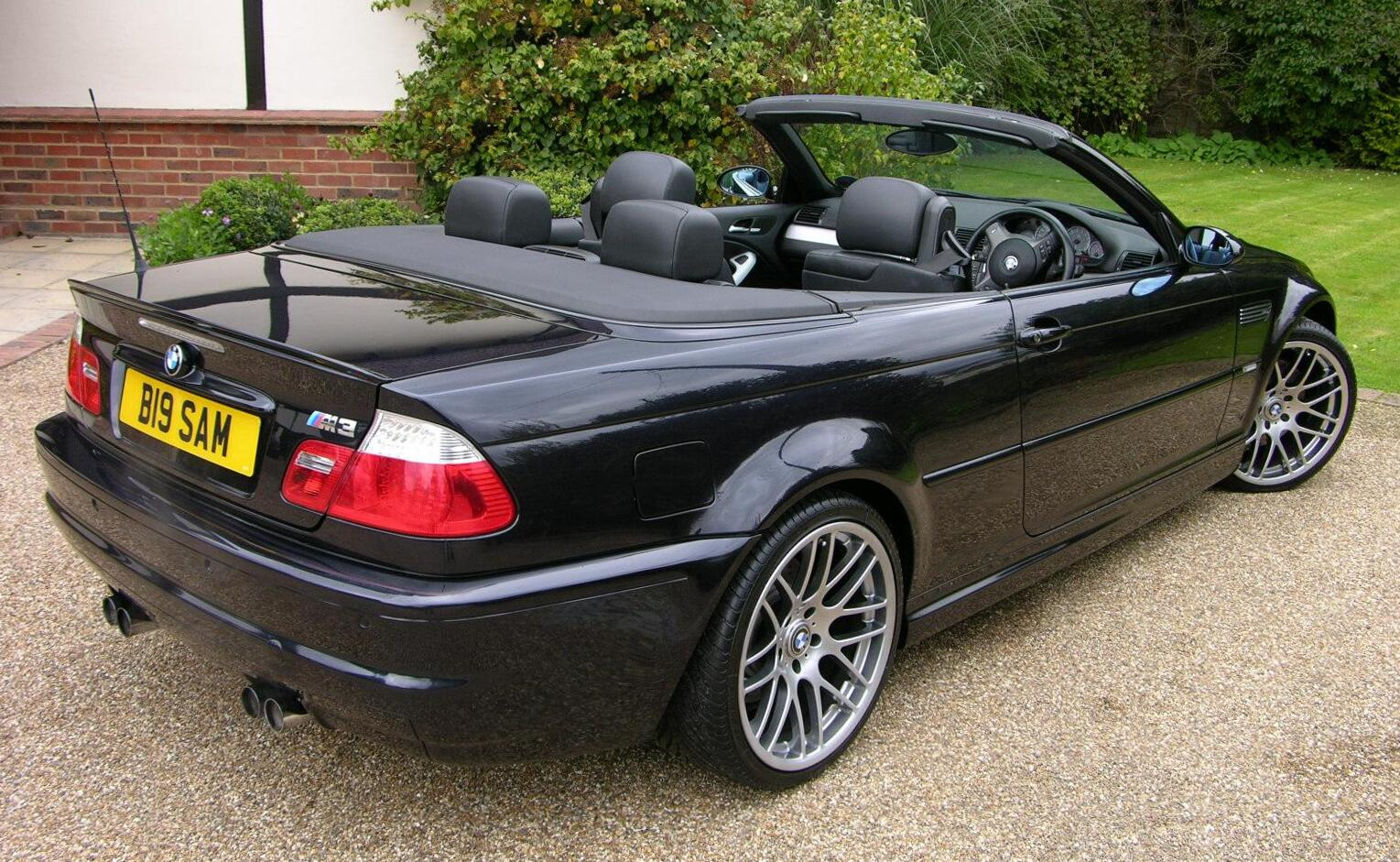
2001 BMW M3 convertible

A convertible or cabriolet (/ˌkæbrioʊˈleɪ/) is a passenger car that can be driven with or without a roof in place. The methods of retracting and storing the roof vary across eras and manufacturers.

A convertible car's design allows an open-air driving experience and can provide a roof when required. A potential drawback of convertibles is their reduced structural rigidity (requiring significant engineering and modification to counteract the side effects of almost completely removing a car's roof).

Most convertible roofs are of a folding construction, with the actual top made of cloth or other fabric. Other types of convertible roofs include retractable hardtops (often constructed from metal or plastic) and detachable hardtops (where a metal or plastic roof is manually removed and often stored in the trunk).

== Terminology ==
Other terms for convertible cars include cabriolet, cabrio, drop-top, drophead coupé, open two-seater, open-top, ragtop, soft-top, spider, and spyder, although automakers often use these labels interchangeably depending on the market and different times. Thus, nomenclatural consistency is rare and many people now use these terms interchangeably. The term cabriolet originated from a carriage cabriolet: "a light, two-wheeled, one-horse carriage with a folding top, capable of seating two persons"; however, the term is also used to describe other convertibles.

In the United Kingdom, the historical term for a two-door convertible is drophead coupe, and a four-door convertible was called an all-weather tourer.

== History ==
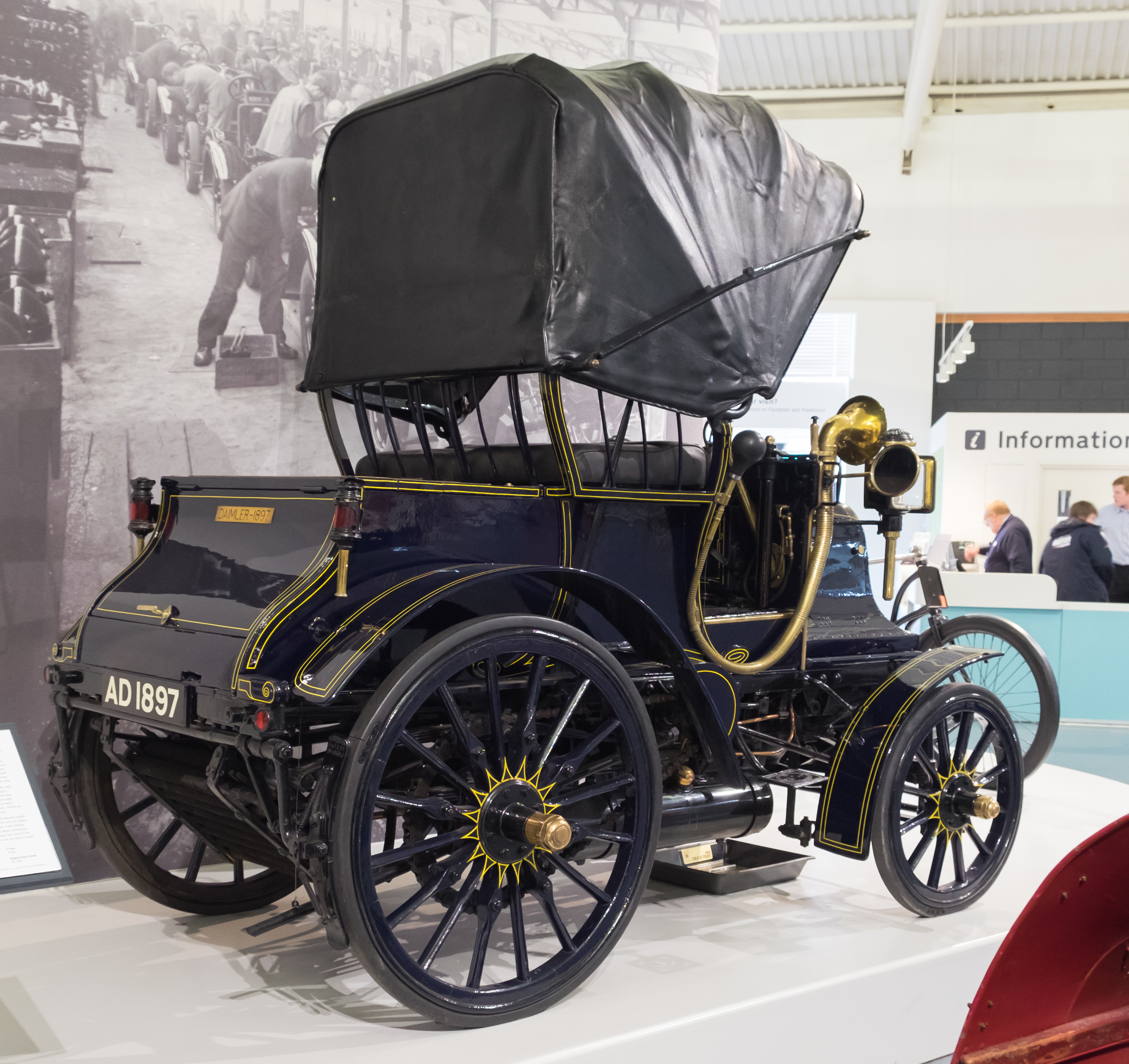
An 1897 Daimler Grafton Phaeton

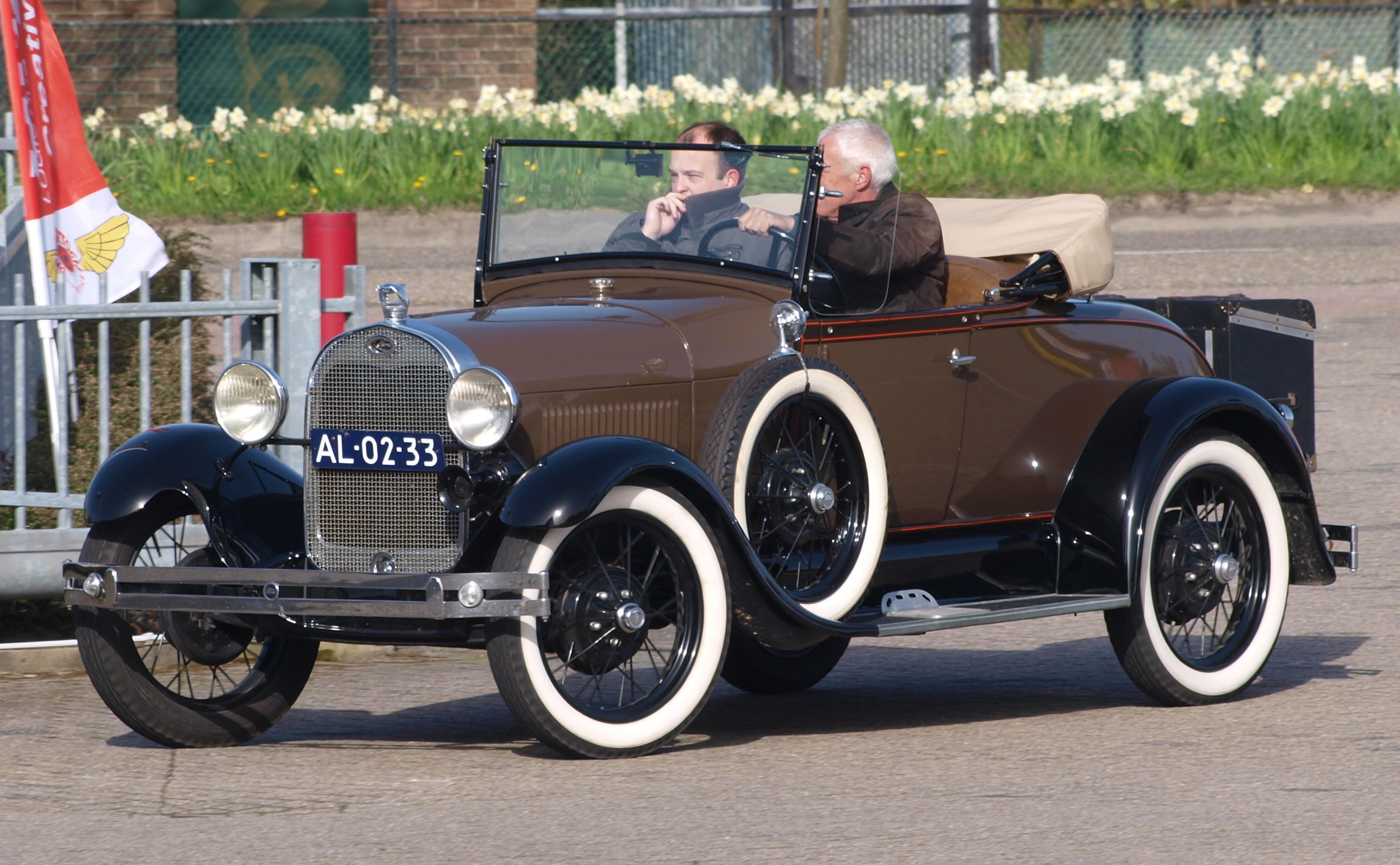
A 1929 Ford Model A Roadster

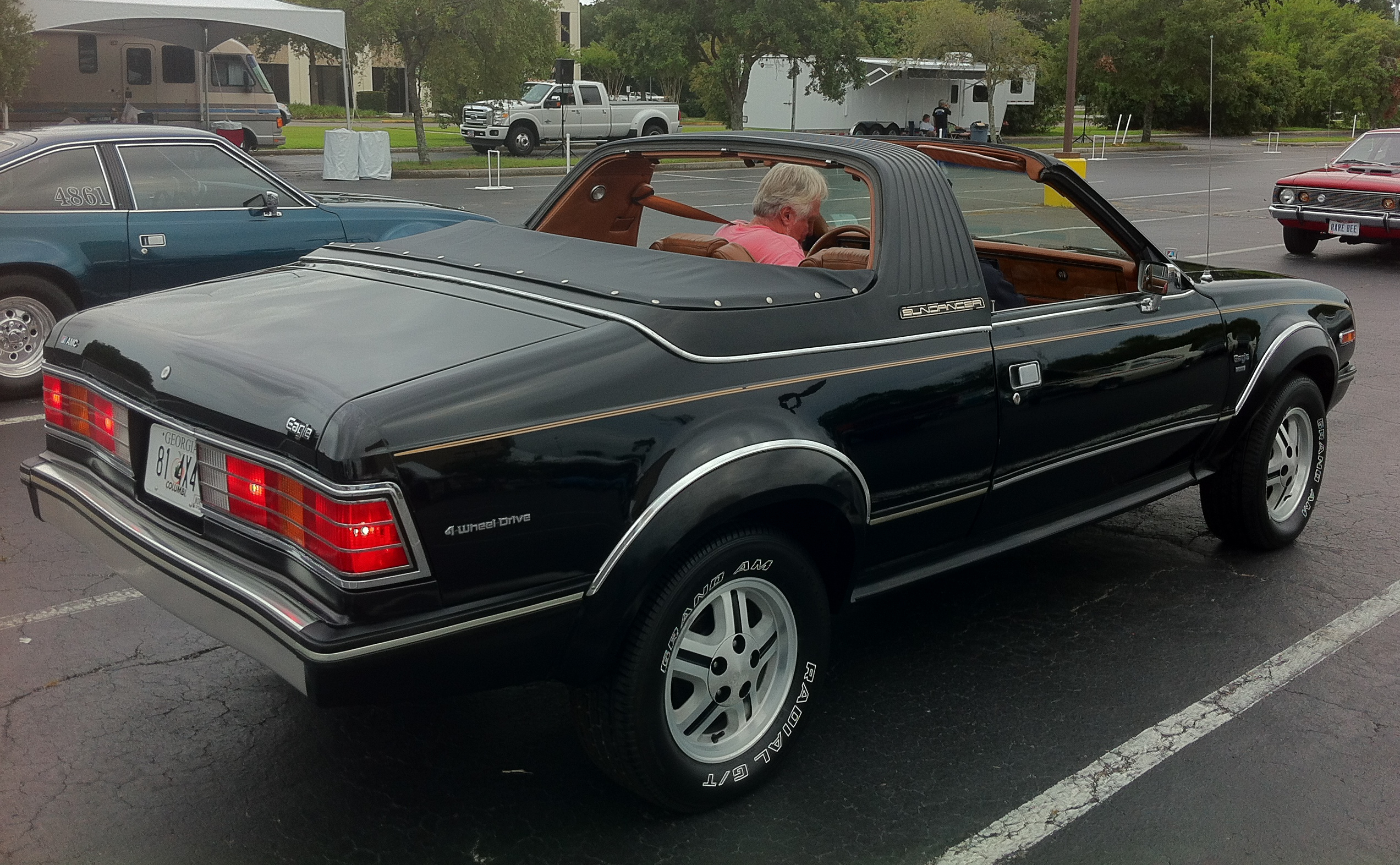
A 1981 AMC Eagle Sundancer

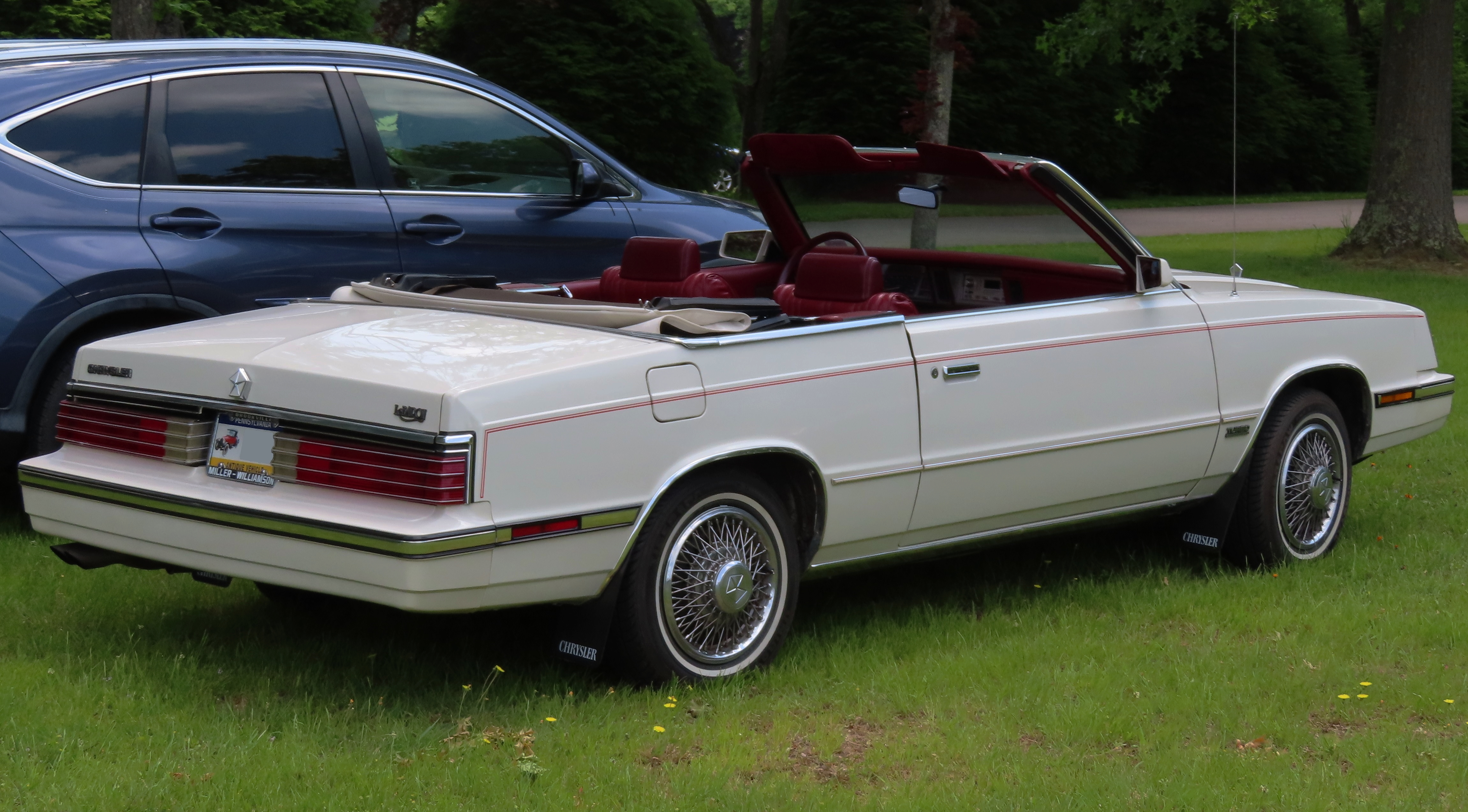
A 1985 Chrysler LeBaron convertible

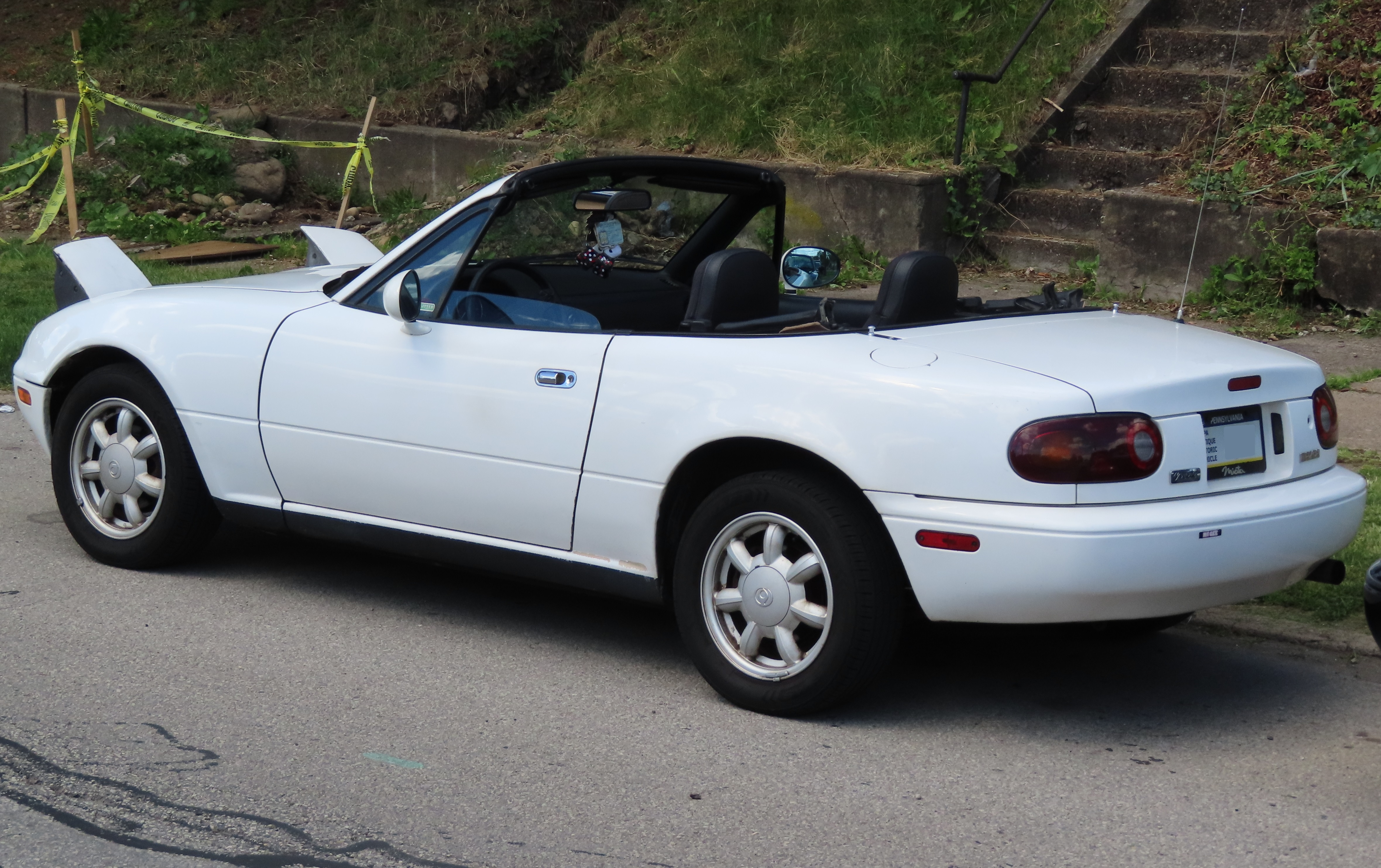
A 1990 Mazda MX-5 Miata convertible

Most of the early automobiles were open-air vehicles without any roof or sides. As car engines became more powerful by the end of the 19th century, folding textile or leather roofs (as had been used on victoria or landau carriages) began to appear on cars. Examples of early cars with roofs include the phaeton (a two-seat car with a temporary roof), the brougham or a coupé de ville, having an enclosed passenger compartment at the rear, while the driver sat in front either in the open, or the landaulet, where the driver has a fixed roof and the passenger compartment has a folding roof. Less expensive cars, such as runabouts, sporting roadsters, or sturdy touring cars, remained either completely open-air or were fitted with a rudimentary folding top and detachable clear side curtains.

In the 1920s, when steel bodies began to be mass-produced, closed cars became available to the average buyer, and fully open cars began to disappear from the mainstream market. By the mid 1930s, the remaining small number of convertibles sold were high-priced, luxury models. In 1939, Plymouth introduced the first mechanically operated convertible roof powered by two vacuum cylinders.

Demand for convertibles increased as a result of American soldiers in France and the United Kingdom during World War II familiarizing themselves with small roadster cars, which were not available in the United States at that time. These roadsters included the MG Midget and Triumph Roadster. The convertible design was incorporated into the mass market unibody by Hudson in 1948. United States automakers manufactured a broad range of convertible models during the 1950s and 1960s – from economical compact-sized models such as the Rambler American and the Studebaker Lark, to the more expensive models, such as the Packard Caribbean, Oldsmobile 98, and Imperial by Chrysler. Automakers often included a convertible body style as an available body style in a model range.

Convertibles in the U.S. market peaked in sales around 1965. They fell out of favor over the next five years. Optional air conditioning was becoming increasingly popular, and the availability of sunroofs and T-tops limited the appeal of the open body style. Noise, leaks, and repairs associated with fabric tops also contributed to issues that many customers had. The popularity of convertibles was reduced by the increased travel speeds on roads (resulting in more wind and noise for occupants) and the emergence of more comprehensive vehicle crash safety standards in the United States.

The market share of convertibles fell to two or three percent of total sales, and the U.S. automakers discontinued the body style from their lineups. American Motors (AMC) stopped making convertibles after the 1968 model year, Chrysler after 1971, Ford after 1973, and most divisions of General Motors after 1975. Cadillac held out until 1976, when it made about 14,000. The last 200 had a red, white, and blue motif and a dashboard plaque. The very last was offered to the Smithsonian Institution, whose trustees turned it down, as it was not at that moment a historic artifact, "Though it might well be in three generations ... or at the Tricentennial." After the last Cadillac Eldorado convertible was made in 1976, the only factory convertibles sold in the United States were imported. Making convertibles on the assembly line was both expensive and time-consuming, thus not worth the problems needed to sell the limited number of cars.

Specialized coachbuilders were contracted to make dealer-available cars such as the targa top versions of the AMC Concord and Eagle "Sundancer", as well as the Toyota Celica "Sunchaser" as specialty models. American Sunroof Company (ASC), which was responsible for popularizing the sunroof option for regular body styles, converted a Buick Riviera into a full convertible that compelled General Motors to market it as part of the 1982 Buick models. Chrysler Corporation also introduced a convertible body style in its 1982 lines that was based on the K-Car. These models were the LeBaron, produced under Chrysler, and the 400, manufactured under Dodge. Ford reintroduced a convertible Mustang for 1983, while American Motors Corporation (AMC) added a convertible version of the Renault Alliance in 1984.

In 1989, Mazda released the first-generation Mazda MX-5 (called "Miata" in North America), which has become the best-selling convertible with over 1 million cars sold. Also in 1989, Toyota released the Toyota Soarer Aerocabin, which uses an electrically operated retractable hardtop roof. A total of 500 were produced.

Models dedicated to the convertible body style include the Mazda MX-5, Porsche Boxster, and Opel Cascada.

== Roof types ==
=== Textile ===
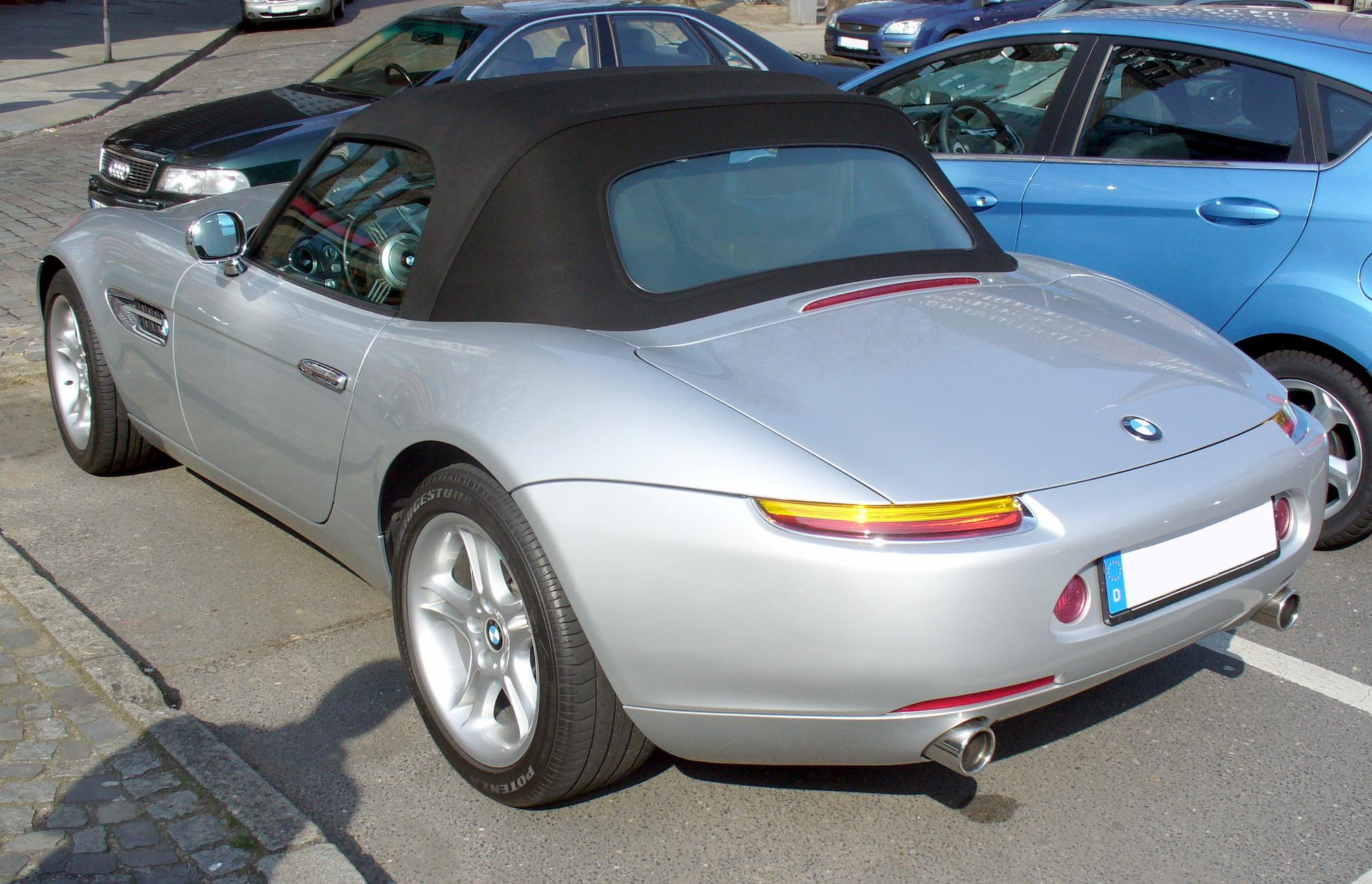
BMW Z8 with a fabric roof in the up position

A "soft top" is made from a flexible textile material:

- Early convertibles used cotton canvas woven so tightly that it was waterproof. Automakers had problems in securing raw materials to fulfill orders after World War II, including canvas in various shades for convertible tops, therefore limiting their manufacture.
- A cloth-based material has become more common in recent years.

Other materials are also used in the convertible top. By 1955, the most popular materials were latex and butyl rubber fabrics that each accounted for around 35% of the convertible top's weight, with others included vinyl (12%), jute (8%), along with rayon and acrylic fibers (Orlon), amounting to about 1% each in the compositions. Polyvinyl chloride (PVC) material was used for many convertible tops. The material consists of two layers: a top layer of PVC, whose structure varies by vehicle model, and a lower layer of fabric (usually cotton).

The collapsible textile roof section over an articulated folding frame may include linings such as a sound-deadening layer and/or an interior cosmetic lining to hide the frame.

The folded convertible mechanism with the top is called the stack. Designs that fold down to a lower stack height offer a smoother silhouette for the car with the top down, while concealed side rails allow room for three passengers in the back seat, such as on the 1967 Rambler Rebel convertible.

=== Detachable hardtop ===
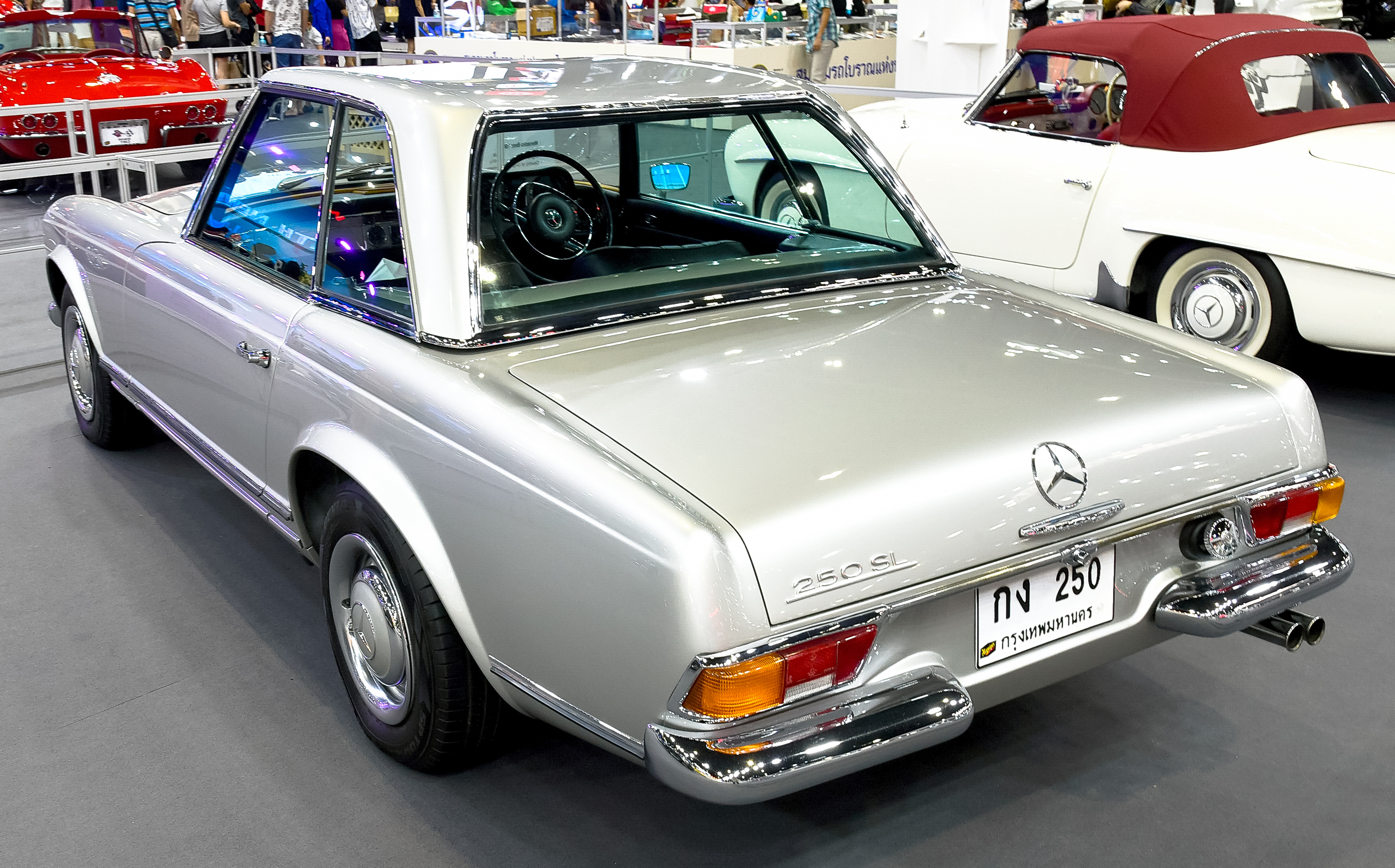
1967 Mercedes-Benz 250 SL with a detachable hardtop

Rigid removable hardtops, many of which can be stored in a car's trunk/boot, have been available at least since the 1950s. These usually provide greater weatherproofing, soundproofing, and durability compared to fabric-based tops; some are available with integrated rear-window defrosters and windscreens. Examples include the Ford Thunderbird (first- and 11th-generations), Mercedes SL (second- and third-generations), Porsche Boxster, Jeep Wrangler, Ford Mustang Cobra (1995 only), and Mazda MX-5.

During the 1950s and 1960s, detachable hard-material roofs were offered for various convertible sports cars and roadsters, including the 1955–1957 Ford Thunderbird and Chevrolet Corvette, as well as the 1963–1971 Mercedes-Benz W113 series of two-seaters. Because the convertible top mechanism is itself expensive, the hard roof was customarily offered as an additional, extra-cost option. On early Thunderbirds (and Corvettes through 1967), buyers could choose between a detachable hardtop and a folding canvas top at no additional cost, but paid extra for both.

The metal-framed "Carson top" was a popular addition on custom American cars, particularly 1930s Ford convertibles or roadsters, because it turned these models into an almost instant hardtop. The design mimicked a convertible top, but lacking the bulky folding mechanisms that enabled the removable hardtop to have a much lower and more rakish profile.

Improvements in canvas tops have made the detachable hard roof less common, in part because the roof cannot be stored inside the vehicle when not in use, which requires a garage or other storage facility. Additionally, some detachable hardtops require multiple people to install or remove. Some open cars continue to offer it as an option. For example, the Mazda MX-5 has an optional hardtop, which is required in some auto racing series.

=== Retractable hardtop ===
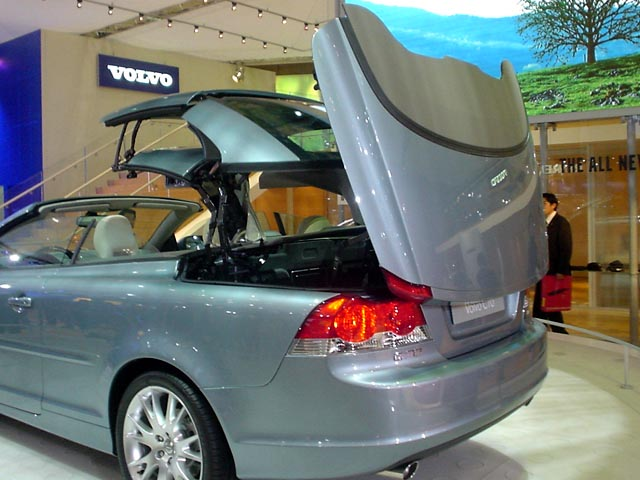
A Volvo C70 retractable hard roof with folding segments

A retractable hardtop – also known as "coupé convertible" or "coupé cabriolet" – is a car with an automatically operated, self-storing hardtop (as opposed to the textile-based roof used by traditional convertibles).

The benefits of improved climate control and security are traded off against increased mechanical complexity, cost, weight, and often reduced luggage capacity.

== Other design features ==
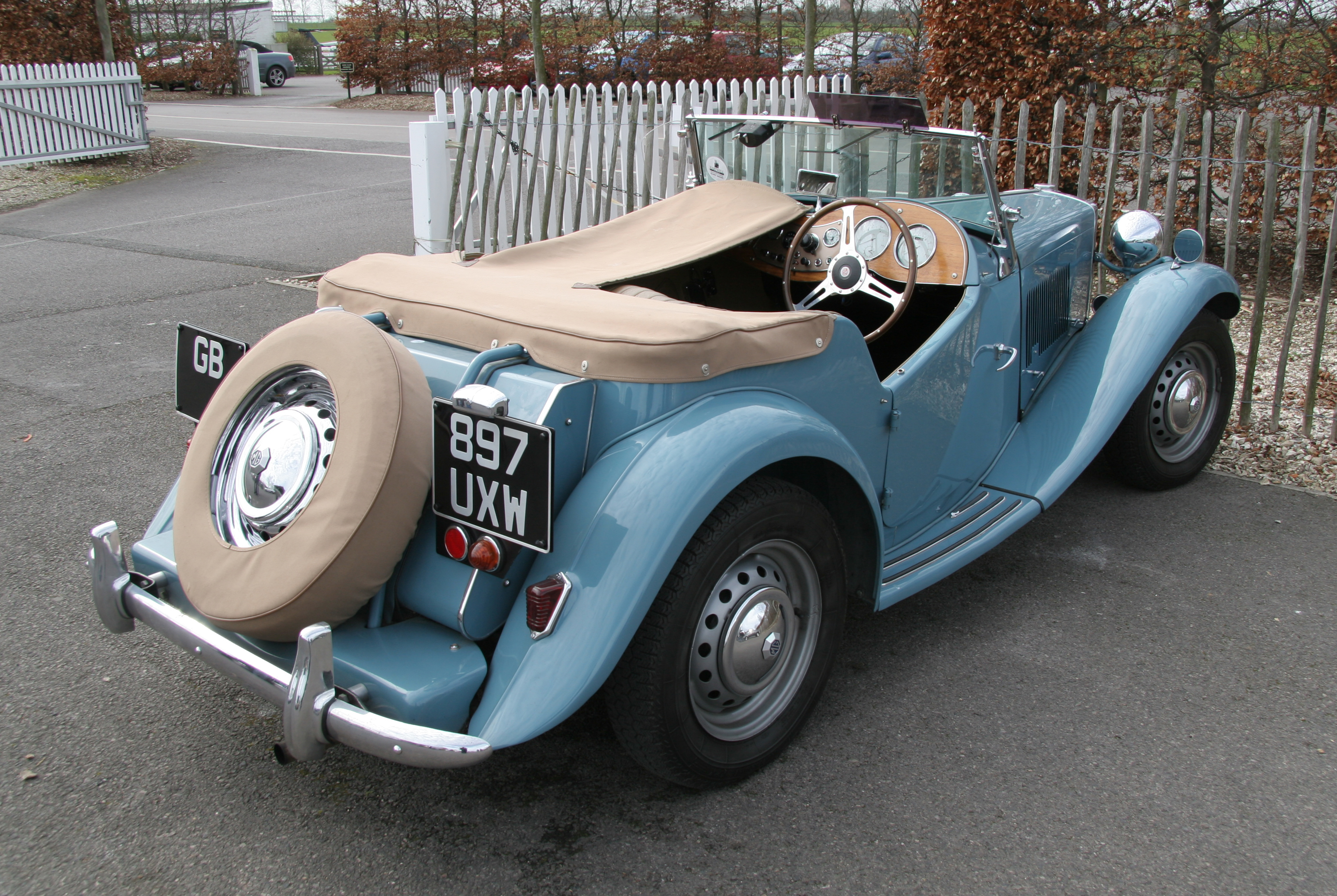
MG TD open two-seater with tonneau cover over the passenger seat and luggage space

=== Tonneau cover ===
Folding textile convertible tops often fail to completely hide their internal mechanism or can expose their vulnerable underside to sun exposure and fading. A tonneau cover provides a solution.

=== Rear window ===
Rear windows are often part of the roof assembly. Traditionally, the rear window in a soft-top was made from plastic; however, more recently some convertibles have used glass for the rear window.

=== Windblocker ===
A windblocker or wind deflector minimizes noise and rushing air reaching the occupants. According to the engineer responsible for the 2008 Chrysler Sebring, its windblocker reduces wind noise by approximately 11 to 12 dB.

Several convertibles are available with a heating duct to the neck area of the seat, which is often called an "Air Scarf". Examples of cars with this feature include Mercedes-Benz SLK-Class, Mercedes-Benz SL-Class, and Audi A5/S5.

=== Safety ===
Modern safety features specifically for convertibles include:

- rollover protection structures (ROPS) with pyrotechnically charged roll hoops hidden behind the rear seats that deploy under rollover conditions
- heated rear window (for improved visibility)
- boron steel-reinforced A-pillars
- safety cage construction – a horseshoe-like structure around the passenger compartment
- door-mounted side-impact airbag which inflates upward (instead of downward like the typical curtain airbag) to provide head protection even with an open window

== Variations ==
Convertibles have offered numerous iterations that fall between the first mechanically simple fabric tops to complex retractable roofs made from hard materials:

Roadster: A roadster (also called spider or spyder) is an open two-seat car with emphasis on sporting appearance or character. Initially, an American term for a two-seat car with no weather protection, usage has spread internationally and has evolved to include two-seat convertibles.

Cabrio coach: A cabrio coach (also called semi-convertible) has a retractable textile roof, similar to a traditional convertible. The difference is that a convertible often has the B-pillar, C-pillar and other bodywork removed. However, the cabrio-coach retains all bodywork to the top of the door frames and just replaces the roof skin with a retractable fabric panel.

An advantage of a cabrio coach is that retaining more of the car's original structure means that structural rigidity is higher (or the vehicle weight is lower) than traditional cabriolets. An example of the cabrio coach is the 2003-10 C3 Pluriel, which has a roof with five possible configurations.

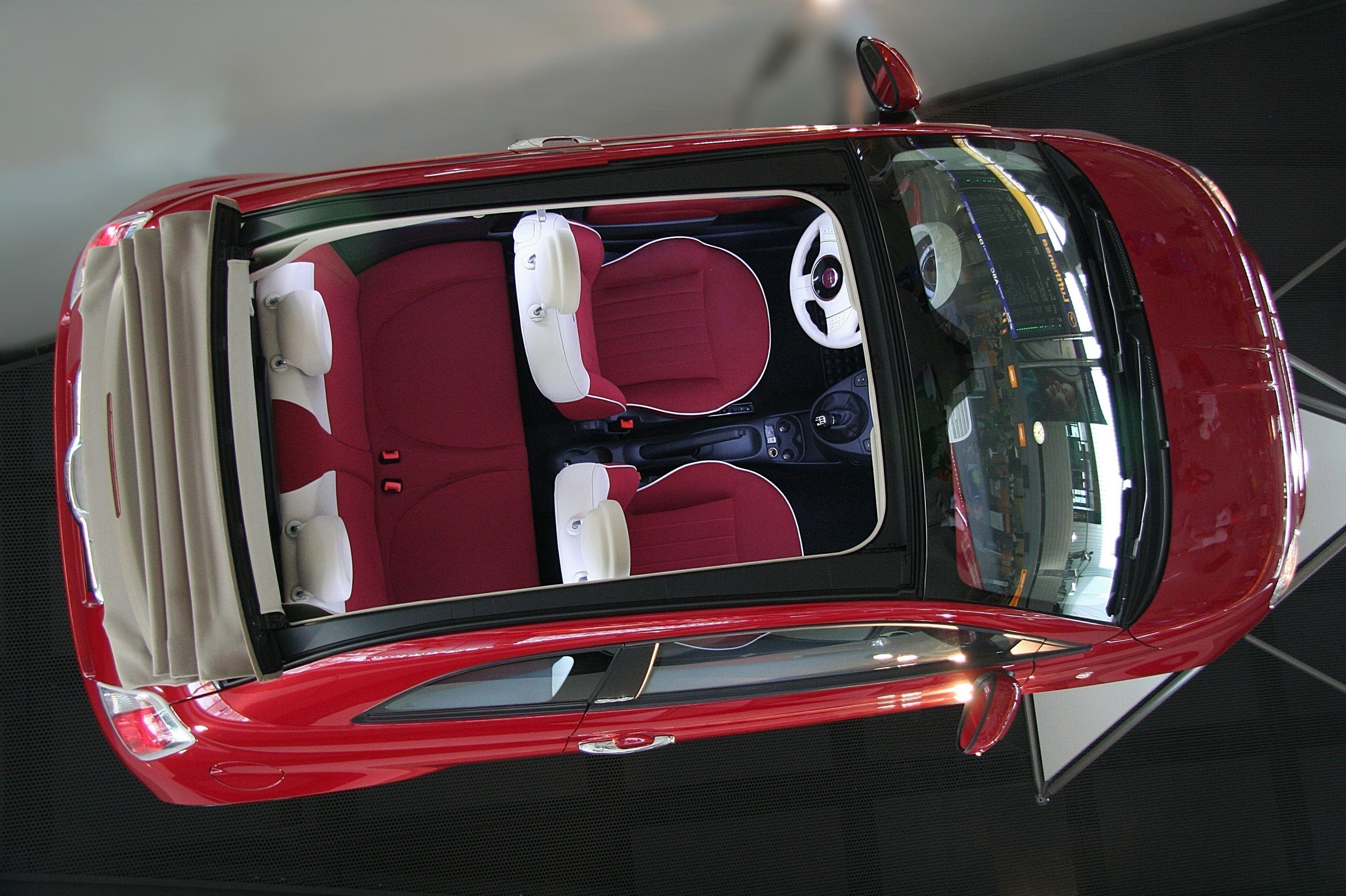
Fiat 500 Cabrio with fabric roof and fixed profile

Fixed-profile: In contrast to convertibles where the entire bodywork above the beltline (doors, roof, side pillars, side bodywork) is replaced with a folding or retractable roof, the fixed profile convertible retains portions of fixed bodywork including the doors, side pillars, and side elements of the roof—while a center fabric portion slides back and accordions at the rear. As an example, Citroën's 1948 Citroën 2CV featured rigid bodysides and two doors on each side, along with a sunroof that rolled back on itself and extended to the rear bumper in place of a separate trunk lid. Other fixed-profile convertibles include the 1957 Autobianchi Bianchina Trasformabile, 1957 Vespa 400, 1950 Nash Rambler Landau Convertible Coupe, the Nissan Figaro (1991), the Jaguar XJ-SC (1983), the 1957 Fiat 500 and its 2007 Fiat 500 successor, as well as the Microlino Spiaginno (2024). The 1984 Heuliez-designed Citroën Visa Décapotable used elements of a fixed-profile convertible.

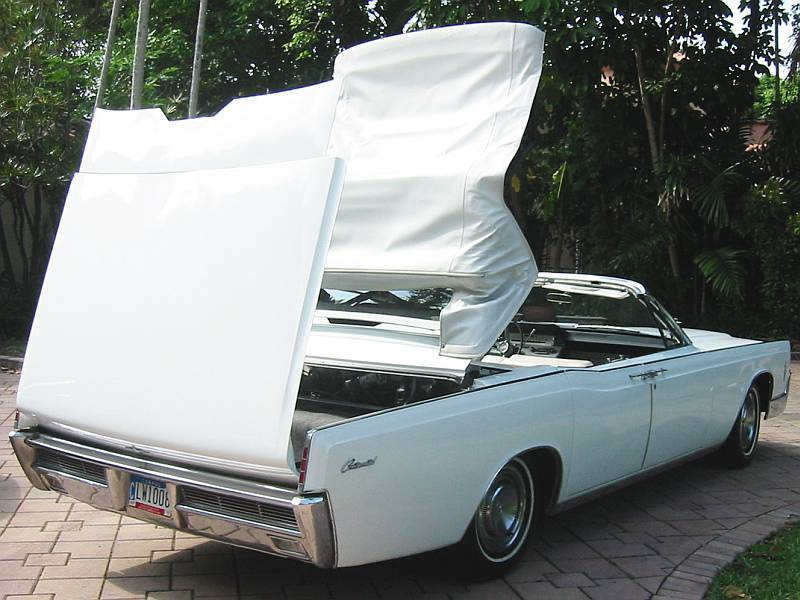
1966 Lincoln Continental

Four-door: Most convertibles have two doors. However, four-door convertibles have been mass-produced. Examples include the 1940–41 Cadillac Series 62, 1931 Chrysler Imperial Dual Cowl Phaeton and 1961–67 Lincoln Continental. Current production four-door convertibles include the Jeep Wrangler Unlimited and Ford Bronco.

Peugeot presented a concept four-door retractable hardtop convertible, the Peugeot 407 Macarena in 2006. Produced by French coachbuilding specialist Heuliez, the Macarena's top can be folded in 60 seconds, with a steel reinforcing beam behind the front seats incorporating LCD screens for the rear passengers into the crossmember.

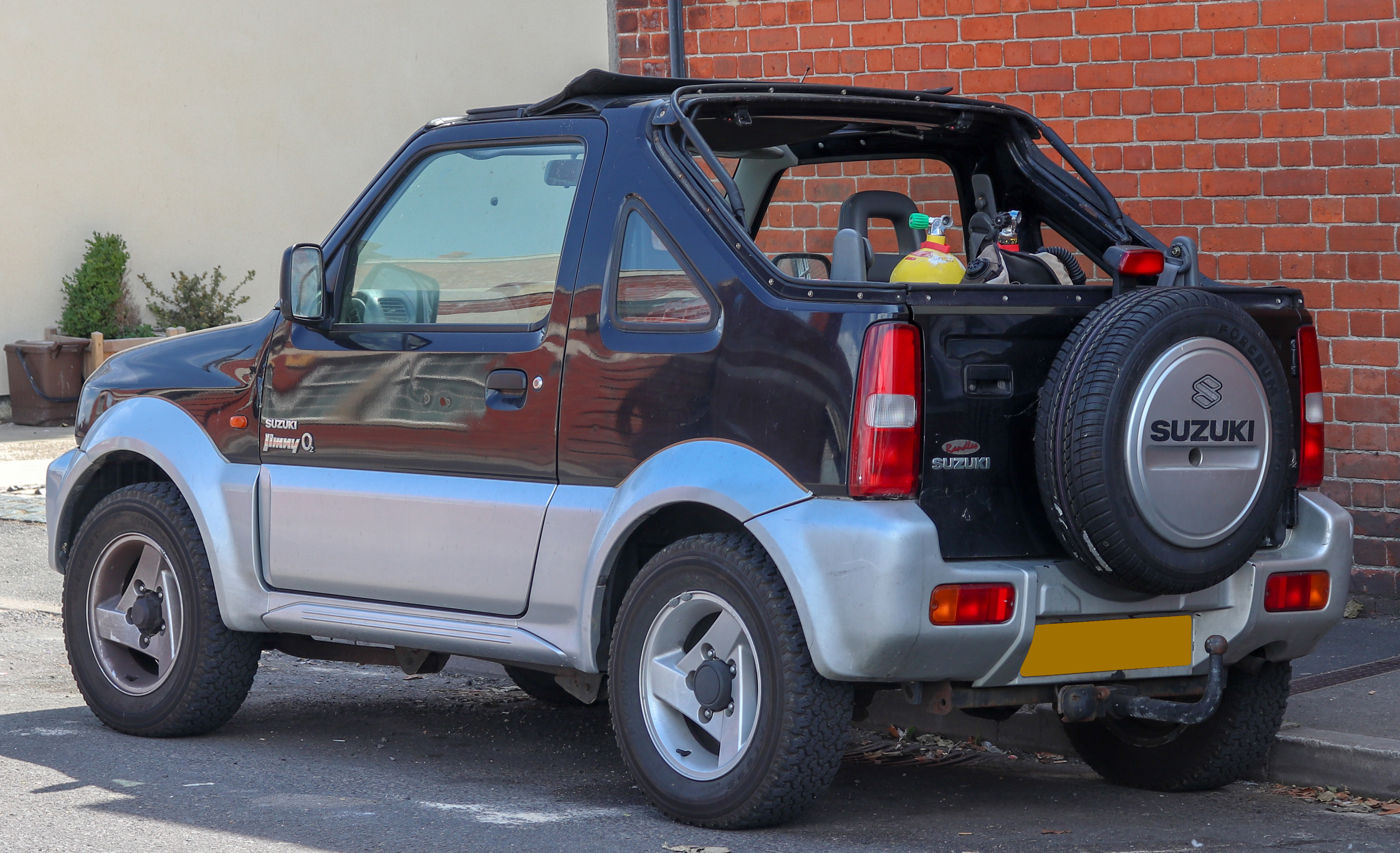
Suzuki Jimny with a removable soft top

Off-road: Several off-road vehicles have been produced with removable soft tops. Examples include the Jeep Wrangler, Suzuki Vitara, Suzuki Jimny, Ford Bronco, Land Rover Defender, Mercedes-Benz G-Class as well as early models of the Toyota Land Cruiser and Land Rover Defender. Typically, the soft tops attach to the roll cage or to the installation points on the vehicle's body.

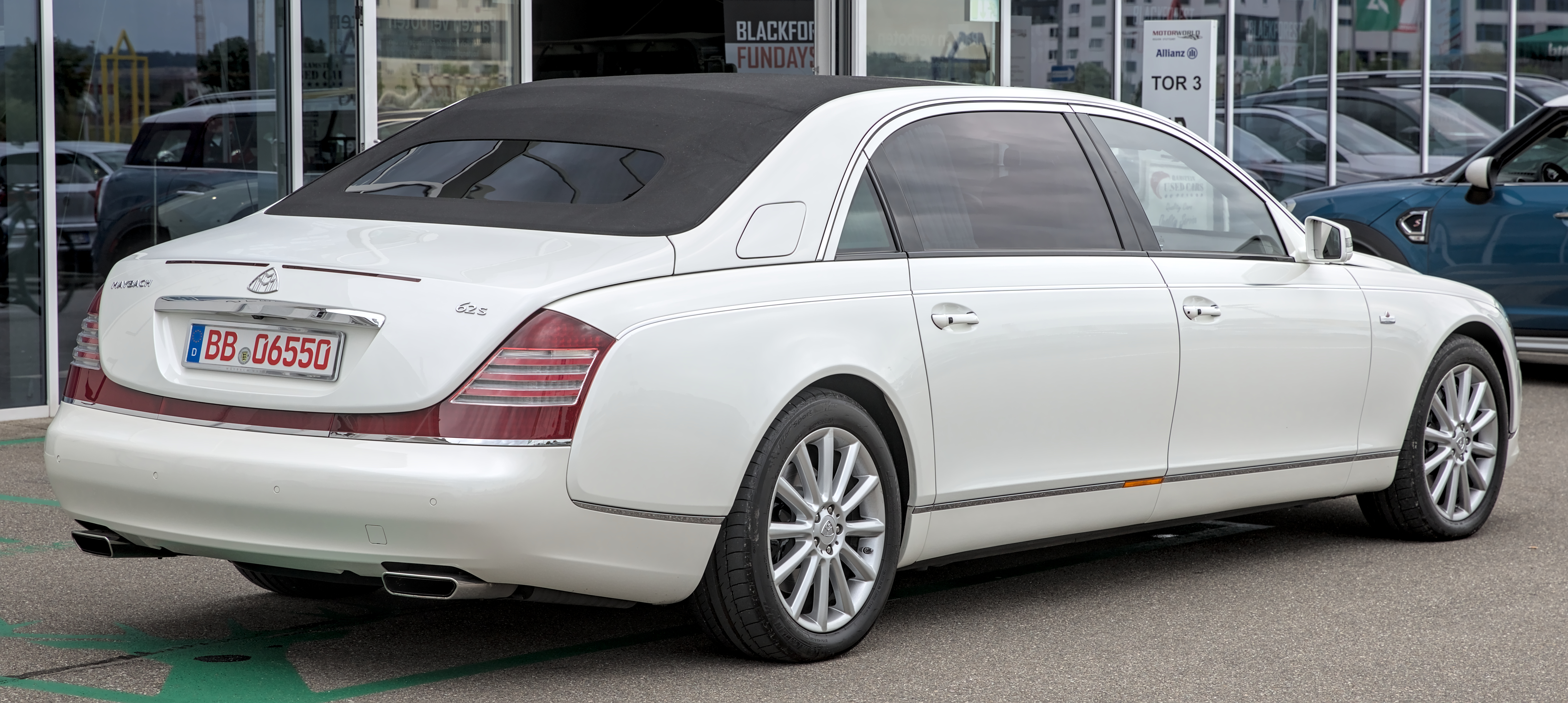
2007 Maybach 62 S Laundaulet

Landaulet: A landaulet (also known as landaulette) is where the rear passengers are covered by a convertible top. Often the driver is separated from the rear passengers with a partition, as per a limousine.

In the second half of the 20th century, landaulets were used by public figures (such as heads of state) in formal processions. They are now rarely used, for fear of terrorist attacks.

Victoria-Cabriolet: reminiscent of the victoria carriage style, a three-position convertible. No rear side windows and equipped with a soft top that can be raised partway, leaving the area above the front seats folded back. This body style had a short period of popularity, mainly in the 1930s. Other names include Cabriolet/Coupé Milord (or just Milord), Calash (from Calèche), Folding Head DHC, three-position Drop-head Coupé, or Cabriolet toit de 3 positions.

== See also ==
- NASCAR Convertible Division
- Sunroof
- Targa top
- Vinyl roof
