= Carson Kievman =

American contemporary classical musician

- Genre: Contemporary classical music
- Occupations: Composer; director; producer
- Born: December 27, 1949; North Hollywood, California, U.S.
- Died: October 12, 2021 (aged 71); West Florida, U.S.
- Education: California Institute of the Arts; Tanglewood Music Center; Paris Conservatoire; Princeton University

Carson Kievman (December 27, 1949 – October 12, 2021) was an American composer, director and producer and an innovator of contemporary classical music. His works were noted for their originality, skill, and frequent integration with music theatre and contemporary opera. Kievman's artistic focus ranged from avant-garde music and operatic works in the 1970s to symphonic works in the 1990s, along with orchestral, choral, solo instrument and chamber music. He established the SoBe Institute of the Arts, a performing arts institute in Miami Beach, Florida, from which he produced contemporary music events as well as his earlier operas in a chamber setting.

== Early life and music education ==
Kievman was born in 1949 in North Hollywood, California to an artistic family; his mother was a jazz singer, his father an actor, an uncle a violist. He pursued interdisciplinary studies at California Institute of the Arts (BFA/MF1977), studying music composition under James Tenney and Earl Brown and earning two BMI composition awards (1974, 1976). Before graduating, he found an audience for his works at European music festivals including Darmstadt (1974, 1976, and a retrospective concert in 1992) and Tanglewood (1975 as a Leonard Bernstein fellow and 1978). Kievman cited the influence of various Neue Musik and avant-garde music composers including French composer Olivier Messiaen, with whom he studied at the Tanglewood Music Center and at the Paris Conservatoire. Later in his career Kievman received a fellowship to Princeton University, earning a 2003 PhD in music composition and theory.

== Experimental music and opera theater ==
Kievman moved to New York's Greenwich Village in 1977 and continued to pursue festival commissions and music fellowships. His independent career path was later described by Luigi Nono, who visited the US in 1979; he saw the younger composer as "a complete outsider" who collaborated with other artists without institutional support, organizing productions "even amid great difficulties." Though Kievman's avant-garde works did not fit neatly into traditional musical theater venues, he became a composer-director in residence at The Public Theater when Joseph Papp produced a trilogy of festival works as "soundramas" for the stage. Other Kievman pieces found performance outlets outside of the theater, as when Ordinary Rhythms was adapted by Lynne Taylor-Corbett for the Pennsylvania Ballet.

Kievman went on to compose full-scale operas over the next decade, though these larger-scale works went unproduced for many years, even after organizing a nonprofit company in 1988. A 1982 European commission for Intelligent Systems, a science fiction-themed opera that envisioned multimedia staging, proved a challenge for 1980s theater technology and was not premiered until 2015. An operatic Hamlet was commissioned by Joseph Papp, a visionary producer known to champion little-known works and artists, but Kievman initially postponed the commission and it was completed only shortly before Papp's death in 1991. The Shakespeare in the Park production of Hamlet never took place, though Kievman produced a semi-staged workshop twenty years later. Kievman began developing an opera about Nikola Tesla in 1986 with resident playwright Thomas Babe of The Public Theater, which was produced thirty years later, after Babe's death.

Despite the challenge of independently producing large-scale works, these early operas ultimately generated strongly positive critical reactions. Gail Papp, in her biography of Joseph Papp, wrote that Kievman's trilogy at The Public Theater was "virtuouso" though "[t]he concept was perhaps ahead of its time." His early opera Intelligent Systems was enthusiastically received as a "ground-breaking production," and a "blueprint of a production" for Hamlet suggested that "[w]ith full orchestral garb and an experienced director with sure theatrical instincts to reshape the opera, Kievman's opera may have a future." Among Kievman's still-unproduced works, music critic Alex Ross praised a workshop reading from California Mystery Park for its "considerable virtuosity" and complex emotions, judging that "this opera might have a powerful effect."

== Orchestral works ==
With limited performance outlets for the operas, Kievman turned increasingly to more traditional symphonic forms. The orchestral works often included explicitly dramatic themes. His Piano Concert was staged in 1986 with pianist David Arden as the sole live performer, conveying the plight of a prisoner of conscience amidst painted figures by John Shaw and an electronic orchestra. Arden later recorded an album of Kievman's solo piano works.

In 1989 Kievman became the first composer in residence at the Florida Philharmonic Orchestra under conductor James Judd. He was commissioned twice by the orchestra, including a piece to honor the death of Mozart; yet Kievman composed a full-length symphony for the Mozart event, and the orchestra was able to perform only one movement. Kievman then raised funds through his nonprofit company to record the full work, Symphony No. 2(42), which was conducted by Delta David Gier and released by New Albion Records with positive critical reception. He also produced a recording of Symphony No. 3, again conducted by Gier, depicting the drama of a Florida hurricane. A fourth symphony inspired by climate change, written while Kievman was enrolled at Princeton University, remains unproduced. Kievman explored medieval vocal traditions at Princeton and created the choral work Sine Nomine, later adapted to strings. His dissertation examined musical techniques of transcendence, a theme explored in his own works, in both the medieval work of Johannes Ockeghem and contemporary music of György Ligeti.

== Chamber music and black box opera ==
In 2005 Kievman utilized his nonprofit to establish an arts institute in the rapidly changing South Beach neighborhood of Miami Beach, where the annual Art Basel fair was gaining international cultural prominence. Located in the city's oldest public historic building, within blocks of the New World Symphony and Miami City Ballet, SoBe Institute of the Arts offered education programs and became a venue for chamber music performances by students and faculty musicians. Kievman's performance events were noted for highlighting guest artists and the works contemporary classical composers, including Morton Feldman and John Corigliano. The organization also restored an adjacent 1930s theater, in which Kievman directed original music theater works, beginning with an opening cabaret production that received a local award in 2010.

The small theater enabled Kievman to stage his own operas in a chamber orchestra format. Fairy Tales, written and premiered in the 1990s as a solo song cycle, was expanded to a two-person opera that explored themes of mental illness; it was described by reviewers as "a ground-breaking tour de force…[with] devastating impact," one "that could easily be done in small venues anywhere modern opera is welcome." The production's innovative use of full-stage, multimedia projections in a black box theater also enabled Kievman to adapt Intelligent Systems to a chamber setting; reviewers praised its "theatrical invention" and noted that it "could easily be done with a big chorus, the images and a large orchestra in a concert setting and no staging, and the music would translate very well." When the city later vacated the SoBe Arts facilities for renovations, Kievman's opera Tesla was produced in a larger theater; it was described by reviewers as a "more lyrical...and mainstream" opera that "could have a future." Kievman retired in 2019 to West Florida where he actively composed until his death in 2021.
