= Carson Williams =

Carson Williams may refer to:

- Carson Williams (electrical engineer), American noted for his light shows using Christmas lights
- Carson Williams (baseball) (born 2003), American baseball player
- Carson Williams (steeplechaser) (born 2002), American track and field athlete
