= Walter Carsen =

Canadian businessman and philanthropist

Walter Carsen (August 14, 1912 – October 8, 2012) was a German-born Canadian businessman and philanthropist, mainly known for his support of the arts.

He was born into a Jewish family in Cologne. When he was six, his father died; Carsen was adopted by his stepfather, a lawyer. He went on to study law. In 1938, he moved to London to avoid persecution by the Nazis; his parents fled to the Netherlands but were later murdered at Auschwitz. Although a refugee, he was arrested as an enemy alien by the British and sent to a prison camp in Canada. Carsen avoided talking about this time in his life. In 1943, he got a job grinding optical lenses in Toronto. Later that year, he married Clementine Nahm. He volunteered to join the Royal Electrical and Mechanical Engineers, at which time he adopted the surname Carsen; his original surname is not known.

In 1945, he started a distribution business for cameras and optical equipment. In 1949, he became the Canadian distributor for Olympus. The company became the largest independent supplier in its field in Canada. Carsen sold the business in 1962 but continued to be involved with real estate, property development and other investments.

Carsen and his wife Clementine had two children: Johanni and Robert. In 1975, he separated from his wife; the couple never divorced.

Carsen was a major support of the National Ballet of Canada, the Shaw Festival and the Art Gallery of Ontario. He contributed to the ballet's Walter Carsen Centre and the gallery's Walter Carsen Reading Room, which were named in his honour. He also helped finance the ballet's Dancer Transition Resource Centre and the National Ballet School's artist-in-residence program. He supported 12 new productions for the ballet and its 1991 For the Glory of Mozart dance festival. Carsen also supported art galleries in Hamilton, Windsor, St. Catharines and Oshawa and the Canadian Opera Company. In 2001, he established the Canada Council for the Arts' Walter Carsen Prize for Excellence in the Performing Arts. He also established the Walter Carsen Fund for the Homeless through the United Way Toronto and York Region. He donated parts of his arts collection to the Glenhyrst Art Gallery of Brant and the Art Gallery of Ontario.

In 1993, he was awarded the Montblanc de la Culture Arts Patronage Award. In 2002, he received the International Society for the Performing Arts Foundation Angel Award. In 2000, he received the Ramon John Hnatyshyn Award for Voluntarism in the Performing Arts. Carsen was named an officer in the Order of Canada in 2002.

He died in Toronto soon after his 100th birthday.
