= Carson Smith =

Carson Smith may refer to:

- Carson Smith (baseball) (born 1989), American professional baseball pitcher
- Carson Smith (musician) (1931–1997), American jazz musician and double-bassist
- Carson Smith (politician) (born 1960s), American politician; Republican member of the North Carolina House of Representatives
- Carson McCullers (born Lula Carson Smith; 1917–1967), American novelist, short story writer, playwright, essayist, and poet
