= Carson, Missouri =

Extinct town in the American state of Missouri

Coordinates: 36°42′35″N 91°48′12″W

Carson is an extinct town in Howell County, in the Ozarks of southern Missouri. The community was located on Missouri Route ZZ, adjacent to the railroad, approximately two miles southeast of West Plains.

A post office called Carson was established in 1908, and remained in operation until 1928. The community has the name of Jack Carson, a businessperson in the local mining industry.
