= Brigham City Fire Station/City Hall =

- U.S. National Register of Historic Places
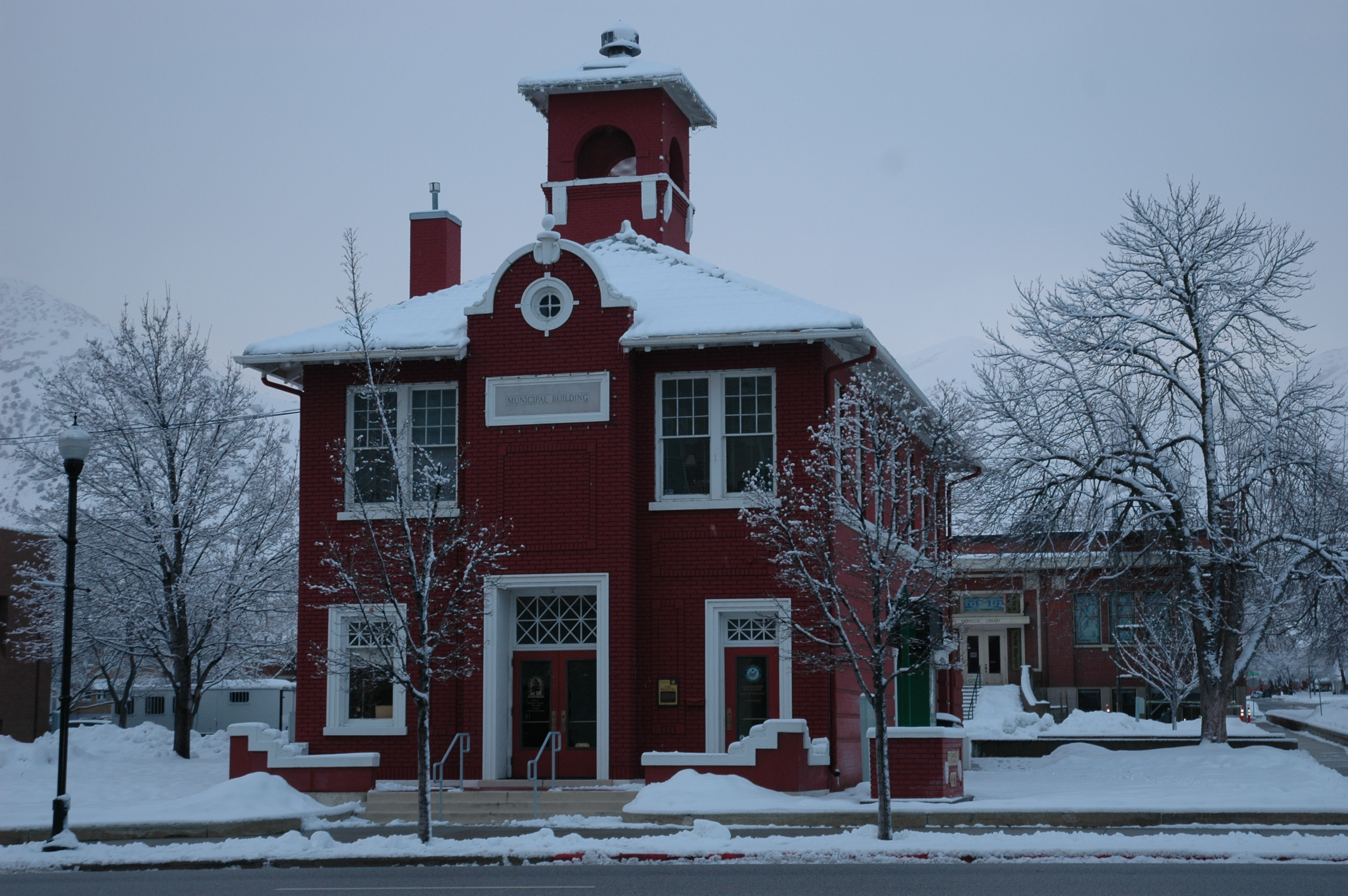

- Location within Utah Location within the United States
- Location: 6 N. Main St., Brigham City, Utah
- Coordinates: 41°30′39″N 112°00′53″W
- Area: 0.2 acres (0.081 ha)
- Built: 1909, 1935
- Architect: Andrew Funk (1909); Carson F. Wells (1935 remodel)
- Architectural style: Mission/Spanish Revival, Spanish Colonial Revival
- NRHP reference No.: 88000389
- Added to NRHP: April 7, 1988

The Brigham City Fire Station/City Hall, at 6 N. Main St. in Brigham City, Utah, was built in 1909. It was listed on the National Register of Historic Places in 1988.

It was designed by architect Andrew Funk and was built as a fire station in 1909. Its hose tower was designed to rise 70 feet (21 m).

It was remodelled in 1935 to serve as city offices, to design by Carson F. Wells.

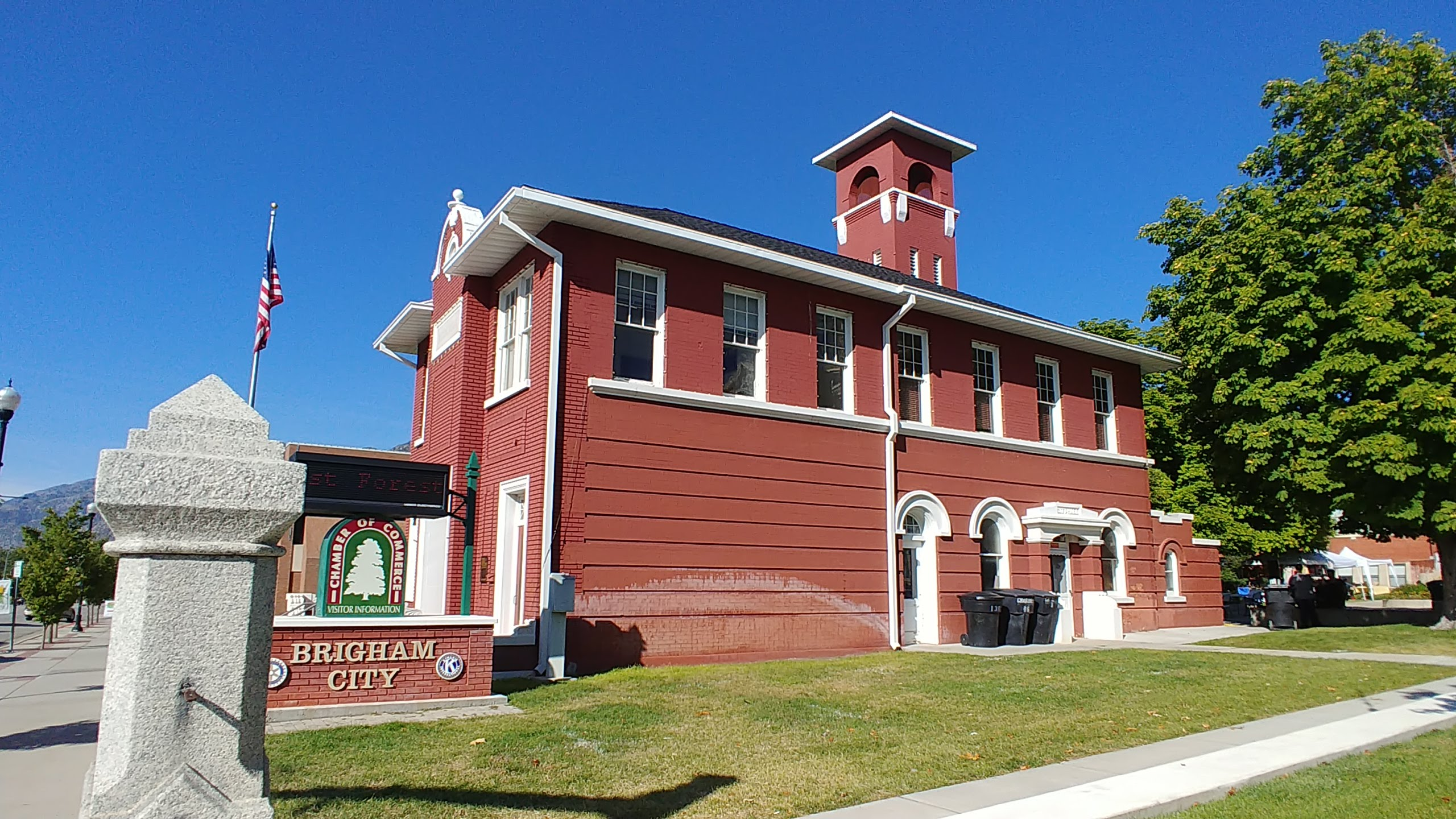
Old Brigham City Fire Station
