= Carsen Stringer =

American computational neuroscientist

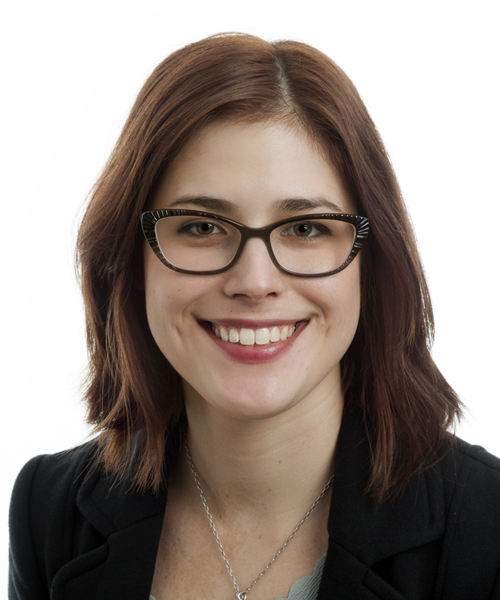
- Stringer in 2017
- Education: University of Pittsburgh; University College London
- Known for: Suite2p calcium imaging analysis software
- Awards: Culver Award for High Achievement in Mathematics, Peter F.M. Koehler Academic Achievement Award in Physics
- Scientific career
- Fields: Computational Neuroscience
- Workplaces: Janelia Research Campus

Carsen Stringer is an American computational neuroscientist and Group Leader at the Howard Hughes Medical Institute Janelia Research Campus. Stringer uses machine learning and deep neural networks to visualize large scale neural recordings and then probe the neural computations that give rise to visual processing in mice. Stringer has also developed several novel software packages that enable cell segmentation and robust analyses of neural recordings and mouse behavior.

== Early life and education ==
In 2009, Stringer pursued her undergraduate degree in Applied Mathematics and Physics at the University of Pittsburgh. She worked under the mentorship of Jonathan Rubin to design prostheses based on passive dynamic walking. She also learned to apply mathematical principles to model biological equilibrium dynamics. Stringer then moved to the United Kingdom in 2013 to conduct her graduate studies at the University College London. At UCL, Stringer worked in the Gatsby Computational Neuroscience Unit under the mentorship of Kenneth D. Harris. Stringer combined her experience in mathematical modelling with her skills and knowledge in neuroscience to explore how multi-neuron recordings can be used to understand the population dynamics that reflect internal state and representations of external stimuli in the brain. Her recordings were performed in the rodent visual cortex and she used a variety of machine learning and dimensionality reduction techniques to explore the network level mechanisms that give rise to neural dynamics. Stringer also helped to develop the Suite2p software which has revolutionized the ability to process videos and computationally analyze the video recordings from in vivo calcium imaging.

== Career and research ==
Following her PhD in 2018, Stringer began her postdoctoral work at the Howard Hughes Medical Institute Janelia Research Campus. She worked under the mentorship of Marius Pachitariu and Karel Svoboda to innovate novel ways to apply deep learning tools for object segmentation, image analyses, and extracting computational principles from large scale neural recordings. She married Pachitariu before he started his lab at Janelia research campus, after which Stringer was awarded her own lab at Janelia research campus.

Stringer is now a Group Leader at Janelia and leads the Stringer Lab. Her team develops machine learning tools for neuroscientists and Stringer educates fellow scientists, through frequent workshops, on how to apply these tools in their own labs. The Stringer Lab also aims to fit biologically inspired deep network models to neural activity data gathered from the visual cortex to gain a better understanding of stimulus encoding in the visual cortex. Through large scale neural recordings, they have found that the neural responses to visual stimuli are high dimensional, and they are constantly innovating new ways to extract structure and understanding from this data through improved visualization software. One goal of the Stringer Lab is to understand how complex behaviors and sensory information are coded in the brain to drive decision making.

=== Principles of sensory encoding ===
During her graduate work, Stringer used large-scale neural recordings to explore the network-level mechanisms that govern intrinsic cortical dynamics. Since sensory coding in the cortex can be affected by noise correlations from intrinsic population dynamics, Stringer created a model that generated intrinsic correlated variability to probe what might underlie the variability in these cortical dynamics. She found that the strength of feedback inhibition in the model seemed to underlie the variability and in the neural data, putative inhibitory neurons seemed to be more active during times with weak noise correlations. Stringer's results verified her network model for intrinsically generated variability and it emphasized the impact of inhibition in the modulation of noise correlations.

=== Data analysis tools ===
In 2017, Stringer and her colleagues developed Suite2p, a calcium imaging analysis pipeline that registers movies, detects active cells, extracts calcium traces, and infers spike times. It has a low computational load and can be run in Python and Matlab to allow detection of over 10,000 cells. This tool is now widely used in neuroscience for analysis of calcium imaging data.

Another software program that Stringer and her colleagues built is Cellpose, a deep learning-based segmentation method that enables researchers to segment and identify cell bodies, membranes, and nuclei in microscopy images. Stringer and her team frequently retrain the model with user-provided images which constantly improves the tool allowing for unbiased and efficient detection of cellular objects.

Stringer has also recently developed and implemented a behavioral analysis software called Facemap, which is essentially a toolbox with a graphical user interface that allows for automated extraction of orofacial behaviors in mice. Through this tool, Stringer explored whether neural "noise" previously reported during stimulus presentation is actually behaviorally driven as opposed to coding for previous sensory experiences. By monitoring facial expressions in mice and extracting them using Facemap, Stringer found that one third of population activity in the visual cortex could be predicted by a multidimensional model of the mouse's facial patterns. Overall her experiments showed that behavioral state is widely encoded across nearly all neural populations in the forebrain and highlights the fact that neural activity that was once considered noise might be behavioral-state information.

Stringer has also developed a non-linear embedding algorithm for high-dimensional data called Rastermap. This tool enables visualization of high-dimensional data. It sorts neural spikes or calcium signals and ranks them by similarity to enable visualization in a graphical user interface.

=== Optimization of calcium imaging analyses ===
Calcium imaging is a powerful tool in neuroscience and Stringer has been committed to exploring ways to improve its utility through analysis pipeline optimization. Stringer has provided the field with critical knowledge to improve the utility and power of calcium imaging data. She helped to elucidate that non-negative deconvolution (NND) was the best approach when inferring spike times from calcium imaging. Further, the NND method proved to be faster and less biased than alternative supervised methods. Stringer took a deeper dive into all of the computational weaknesses along the data processing pipeline for calcium imaging (motion registration, ROI extraction, spike deconvolution, and quality control) and she proposed computational solutions to these unique problems that arise in calcium imaging analysis. Her work is critical as it shines a light on the many ways that calcium imaging analyses can produce biases that lead to inaccurate scientific interpretations.

== Awards and honors ==
- 2009–2013 University of Pittsburgh Chancellor's Scholarship
- 2012 Peter F.M. Koehler Academic Achievement Award in Physics
- 2012 Culver Award for High Achievement in Mathematics
- 2013 NSF-GRFP

== Select publications ==
- Stringer, C., Pachitariu, M., Steinmetz, N. et al. High-dimensional geometry of population responses in visual cortex. Nature 571, 361–365 (2019). doi:10.1038/s41586-019-1346-5
- Spontaneous behaviors drive multidimensional, brainwide activity. CARSEN STRINGER, MARIUS PACHITARIU, NICHOLAS STEINMETZ, CHARU BAI REDDY, MATTEO CARANDINI, KENNETH D. HARRIS. SCIENCE19 APR 2019
- Computational processing of neural recordings from calcium imaging data. Carsen Stringer and MariusPachitariu. 2019. Current Opinion in Neurobiology 2019, 55:22–31
- Robustness of Spike Deconvolution for Neuronal Calcium Imaging. Marius Pachitariu, Carsen Stringer, Kenneth D. Harris. Journal of Neuroscience 12 September 2018, 38 (37) 7976–7985; doi:10.1523/JNEUROSCI.3339-17.2018
- Suite2p: beyond 10,000 neurons with standard two-photon microscopy. Marius Pachitariu, Carsen Stringer, Mario Dipoppa, Sylvia Schröder, L. Federico Rossi, Henry Dalgleish, Matteo Carandini, Kenneth D. Harris. bioRxiv 061507; doi:10.1101/061507
- Carsen Stringer, Marius Pachitariu, Nicholas A Steinmetz, Michael Okun, Peter Bartho, Kenneth D Harris, Maneesh Sahani, Nicholas A Lesica. Inhibitory control of correlated intrinsic variability in cortical networks. eLife 2016; doi:10.7554/eLife.19695
