= Carson High School =

Carson High School can refer to:

- Carson High School (Carson City, Nevada)
- Carson High School (Carson, California)
- Jesse C. Carson High School, China Grove, North Carolina
- Rachel Carson High School for Coastal Studies, New York City
