= Carson Fox =

American artist

Carson Fox (born Oxford, Mississippi) is an American artist who lives and works in Brooklyn, New York. Her work relies heavily on the imprint that individual experience has on the artist, and centers on the production of sculpture, installation, and prints.

== Biography ==
Fox works primarily in sculpture. Her study of art began at the Pennsylvania Academy of the Fine Arts, where she received a four-year studio certificate. At PAFA, she was awarded the Cresson Memorial Traveling Scholarship, funding three months of European study and an additional fellowship year at the institution. Fox received her BFA from the University of Pennsylvania in Philadelphia, and earned her MFA from Rutgers University.

Fox has been included in solo and group shows in the United States and abroad. She is represented by Linda Warren Projects, Chicago.

== Exhibitions ==
In 2000, Fox received her first major solo exhibition, "Beauty Queens", at Rider University Gallery in Lawrenceville, New Jersey. Since then, her work has been exhibited in solo exhibitions at museums and galleries across the United States, including at the Boulder Museum of Contemporary Art, the Jersey City Museum, and the New Britain Museum of American Art. She was featured in over 50 national and international group exhibitions, including shows at the Museum of Arts and Design, Scottsdale Museum of Contemporary Art, the Jersey City Museum, Nassau County Museum of Art, the Novosibirsk State Art Museum, Indiana State Museum, University Museums at the University of Delaware, Tweed Museum of Art.

In 2009, Fox was commissioned by the New York Metropolitan Transit Authority, to complete a large scale, permanent public work at the Long Island Railroad Station in Seaford, New York

== Collections ==
Fox's work is included in a number of prominent museum collections around the world, including the Museum of Arts and Design (New York), the Jersey City Museum, the Pennsylvania Academy of Fine Arts Museum, Novosibirsk State Art Museum, Russia, and the Royal Museum of Belgium, among others. Corporate collections include Eaton Corporation, Catamaran Corporation, and Kirkland and Ellis, LLP.

== Sculptures ==
Fox's current practice centers on the creation of resin sculptural works that examine the tensions between nature and artifice, the awe of visual spectacle, and humanity's desire to bridle nature and time. Recent work can be categorized as flower, tree, sea, and rock forms. With nature as her subject, Fox contemplates humanity's relationship to the physical world in a profound, symbolic way that speaks to both personal and societal associations. The sculptures are intensely labored, composed of multiple parts of pigmented and cast resin the artist assembles and carves. David McFadden, former chief curator of the Museum of Arts and Design in New York, wrote: "Fox invites the viewer into a world that teeters precariously between the real and the unreal, the beautiful and the unsettling."

In 2011, Fox presented a solo show at The New Britain Museum of American Art, titled "Bi-Polar".

NBMAA wrote about the show:

Bi-Polar is a visually stunning work, but also one that holds inherent potential to evoke emotion. This potential is realized and ignited once the poignant symbolism behind the visual vocabulary is understood, enveloping the viewer in the artist’s personal history. At the same time, Bi-Polar invites the viewer into a wider world of questions regarding the universal human desire to resist against the forces of natural order, push the boundaries of what is within or beyond our control, and ultimately arrest time.

Ice Storm, at Redux Contemporary Art Center in Charleston, SC, shared similar themes. David McFadden, the former chief curator of the Museum of Art and Design, NYC, wrote in the exhibition catalog:

The [installations] establish an ambiance of threat and danger that undermines the sheer physical beauty of the [forms]… Fox's fantasies… hold time in abeyance- what should melt away is made permanent. Change (and by implication, death) is effectively checkmated.

At her 2014 solo exhibition at Linda Warren Projects titled Mimesis, sculptures of coral, crystals, and other natural forms dominated the gallery. Art critic B. David Zarley wrote:

Across Fox’s lavish installation creeps the delicious subversion that comes from recreating-perhaps even improving upon – shock! Blasphemy! – natural beauty with toxic media. It becomes difficult to tell, through the pulchritude and plastic, whether fox is sanctifying nature or supplanting it, genuflecting before creation or substituting her own; she pulls forth these beautiful, terrible ideas, as she does the chthonian forms comprising the bulk of “Mimesis”.

The artist says of her work: “My goal is for (the work) to seem preposterous and wondrous, to underscore that nothing is more perplexing, complex, and extraordinary than nature.”

== Prints ==
Fox's prints embody the same spirit as her sculptural works, "unabashedly and unapologetically beautiful", but "hinting at a more complicated and darker core". They include etchings, digital prints, lithographs and relief prints. They are repetitive and labor-intensive, employing visual elements from Victorian paper works.

Fox writes of her work:

My natural inclination is to be interested in objects and themes that have been left out of the history of art, feeling a particular kinship with marginalized “craft” materials, and the popular illustrations and folk art of the Victorian era. Like the Victorians, the fragility and brevity of life terrifies me, and one way I cope with it is to make things; thereby proving my existence through the evidence of my labor.

Many recent prints contain physical evidence of this labor. Fox pokes thousands of holes into the printed image, “suggesting invisible routes made visible, a tangible history of [her] own industry, while transforming the paper into a lacy map".

== Educator, lecturer and curator ==
Fox maintains an academic career as a collegiate level educator, lecturer, and curator. Her teaching experience includes Harvard University, New York University, Rutgers University, and the Pennsylvania Academy of the Fine Arts, before joining the faculty at Adelphi University in Garden City, New York. Fox has lectured widely on printmaking and sculpture across the United States and abroad, including at Boston University, Maryland Institute College of Art, University of the Arts, and Rutgers University.

Fox is the curator of an annual exhibition series at Adelphi University, "Ephemeral". The sequence "examines the human relationship with the transitory- investigating the role of human experience, memory, and mortality in our lives". She has also curated exhibitions abroad, including the 6th Graphics Biennial (USA) at the Novosibirsk State Art Museum, Novosibirsk, Russia.
