= Robert Carsen =

Canadian opera director (born 1954)

Robert Carsen O.C. (born 23 June 1954) is a Canadian opera director. He was born in Toronto and is the son of philanthropist Walter Carsen.

== Early steps towards directing ==
From an early age "I became obsessed with the theatre" Carsen states and he wanted to become an actor. At Upper Canada College he tells that "was in all the plays and musicals I could get into. In those days, because it was a boys’ school, the boys played both male and female roles. So I played Katisha in The Mikado, and Archibald Grosvenor when we did Patience." Studying theatre at York University in Toronto followed, but by the time he was 20, he abandoned his theatre studies and moved to England to continue studying acting. There he joined the Bristol Old Vic Theatre School for two years and became more interested in directing than acting when:

one of his teachers said he thought Carsen had the makings of a director. "At first I thought he was trying to tell me I was a terrible actor, but in fact he was saying, 'I think you’re actually a director — how your mind works, and the way you contribute to what everyone else is doing.' That got me thinking."

But Misha Aster notes that:

he had never really entertained the possibility of working in opera until, in 1980, he landed an [unpaid] assistant director’s job at the Spoleto Festival in Italy [as well as one at the Royal Opera House in London]. This led to a longer-term association with the Glyndebourne Festival Opera, a prestigious summer opera festival in Sussex, where Carsen assisted many of the important British and American opera stage directors of the day.

== Career beginnings ==
When Carsen was 25 Canadian Opera Company (COC) director Lotfi Mansouri invited him to work as assistant director on Tristan und Isolde, and this was followed directing two operas at the Guelph Spring Festival in Ontario, these being Peter Maxwell Davies' The Lighthouse and Benjamin Britten’s The Prodigal Son.

Carsen started at the Grand Théâtre de Genève in 1987 and he stood out as a designer with the National Ballet of Canada.

== Career highlights ==
Subsequently, Carsen staged Der Ring des Nibelungen by Richard Wagner in Cologne, Eugene Onegin at the Metropolitan Opera, Il Trovatore in Bregenz, Capriccio by Richard Strauss, Alcina by Handel and Rusalka at the Opera Bastille with Renée Fleming, The Magic Flute in Baden-Baden, La Traviata at La Fenice, Mefistofele at the San Francisco Opera and Der Rosenkavalier at the Salzburg Festival.

He directed seven Puccini operas in Belgium and Verdi's Shakespearean trilogy of (Macbeth, Falstaff and Otello) in Germany.

In addition, Carsen directed Sunset Boulevard and The Soldier's Tale with Sting, Vanessa Redgrave and Ian McKellen.

== Recent accomplishments ==
His most recent staging has been of Verdi's Falstaff. This five-company co-production includes Milan's La Scala, London's Covent Garden (where both companies gave performances in the 2012/13 season). the Canadian Opera Company, The Netherlands Opera, and New York's Metropolitan Opera. The Met's December 2013 staging received acclaim.

== Honours ==
In 1996, Carsen received the title of Knight of the Legion of Honour. He was appointed an Officer of the Order of Canada in 2006.
