= John Shaw (painter) =

American-Canadian painter and printmaker (1948–2019)

Brooklyn Bridge, 1983, linocut by John Shaw

John Palmer Shaw (April 23, 1948 - January 3, 2019) was an American/Canadian painter and printmaker.

Shaw's work is in the collections of the Museum of Modern Art, the Brooklyn Museum, the New York Public Library and the Zimmerli Art Museum at Rutgers University.

== Biography ==
Shaw was born in San Mateo, California. He attended Lane High School in Charlottesville, Virginia, and in 1972 received a BFA from The Maryland Institute College of Art (MICA) in Baltimore. He also attended The Art Students League in New York City.

After graduating from art school in Baltimore, Shaw moved to Washington DC. Two years later, in 1974, he moved to Cape Cod for a year and then to New York City in 1975.

For the 15 years he lived in New York, Shaw showed in downtown artist-organized venues and galleries. He rarely traveled north of Houston Street. In 1989, amidst changes in New York City, he moved to Montreal.
