= Carson top =

Type of removable car top

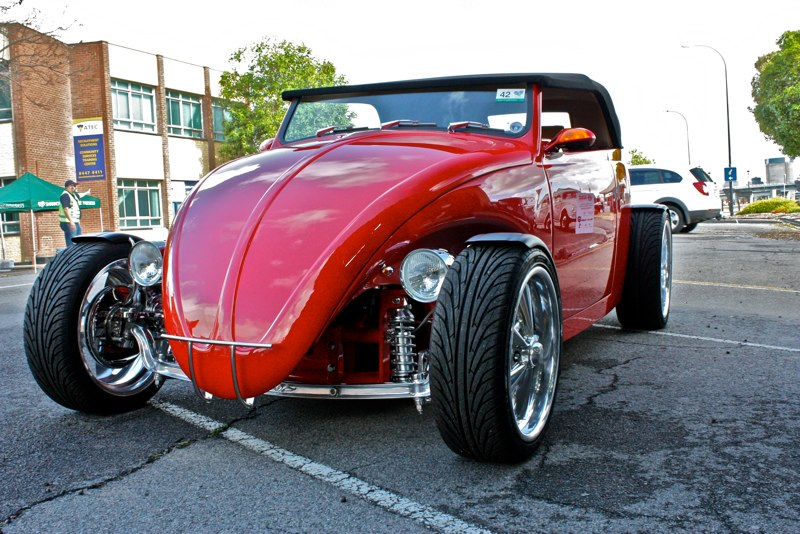
Red Volksrod with a Carson top at the 2010 Volksfest, South Australia

A Carson top is a one-piece, padded, upholstered, removable top for a car. The design was invented by Glen Houser in 1935 when he worked for Amos Carson at Carson Top Shop in Los Angeles. The first Carson top was likely made for a Ford Model A convertible, and nowadays it is mostly used on hot rods and customs.

== Construction ==
Carson tops use a metal framework, which is then typically covered with a layer of aviary wire or chicken wire, followed by burlap, padding and outer canvas. The outer material is typically a convertible top sports material, while the interior of the tops are typically matched with the rest of the car's upholstery.
