= Carson K. Miller =

President Emeritus and founding President of Washington State Community College

Carson K. Miller is an American academic who is the President Emeritus and founding President of Washington State Community College, a comprehensive state college serving southeast Ohio and northern West Virginia. He served as president from October 1, 1985, through his retirement on June 30, 2002.

== Early life ==
Born in Cleveland, Ohio, Miller spent the first half of his professional career in the Canton, Ohio area, beginning with the Timken Company. Miller was an Industrial Sales Engineer, providing design services for off-highway construction and steel processing equipment design.

== Education and career ==
Miller holds an A.A.S. degree in Mechanical Engineering Technology from Stark Technical College, B.S. degree in Industrial Technology from Kent State University, and M.S. and Ph.D. degree in Higher Education Administration from the University of Akron. His major emphasis was in organizational management and not-for-profit financial accounting.

Claiming to be an engineer turned educator, Miller began teaching classes in engineering technology on a part-time basis at Stark Technical College (Canton, Ohio). He later joined the faculty of the mechanical engineering technology program, became department chair and director of the engineering technology division.

Miller served in the United States Air Force. His tour of duty was highlighted by a two-year assignment with the Aerospace Rescue and Recovery Service Air Rescue Service. He was a member of the Project Apollo program recovery team for flights of Apollo 14-17 and Skylab 1–2.

Miller became president of then Washington Technical College (Marietta, Ohio) in 1985. Recognizing that the region did not benefit from the availability of comprehensive higher education opportunities, he began a major change in mission and shepherded the construction of a new 160-acre (0.65 km^{2}) campus in Marietta, Ohio. With the assistance of the Ohio Board of Regents and an understanding state legislature, the area now has a state college campus with comprehensive university and technical education programs. The campus of Washington State Community College was dedicated in September, 1991.

Miller also became involved in the community. Locally he served on the board of Camco Financial Corporation, Marietta Savings Bank, Marietta Memorial Hospital, Chamber of Commerce, United Way (campaign chair), YMCA, Artsbridge, Rotary International (president) and many more organizations. At the state level he served on the Ohio Student Loan Commission (chair), Ohio Appalachian Center for Higher Education (chair), Ohio Campus Compact (chair), and Ohio Community College Athletic Association. His other state-level board memberships included the Ohio Business Council, Ohio Association of Community Colleges, Budget Consultation Committee for the development of the State's operation budget, and many more.

Miller states that his proudest moment was the dedication of the campus library in his name, and that four generations of Carson Millers were in attendance: his father Carson H., son Carson S. and grandson Carson T.

== Personal life ==
Carson and Barb have two children: Scott and Dori. They now enjoy traveling to and spending time with their family and friends, and especially grand children Carrigan, Tommy, Kennedy, and Brennen. Upon his retirement, Dr. Miller began a small business in his lifelong hobby of numismatics - buying and selling rare coins and currency.
