= Carson Millar =

Saint Lucian football manager

Personal information
- Place of birth: Saint Lucia

Managerial career
- Years: Team
- 2004–2006: Saint Lucia

Carson Millar is a Saint Lucian professional football manager.

== Career ==
Since 2004 until 2006 he coached the Saint Lucia national football team.
