= Box Elder County Courthouse =

- U.S. National Register of Historic Places
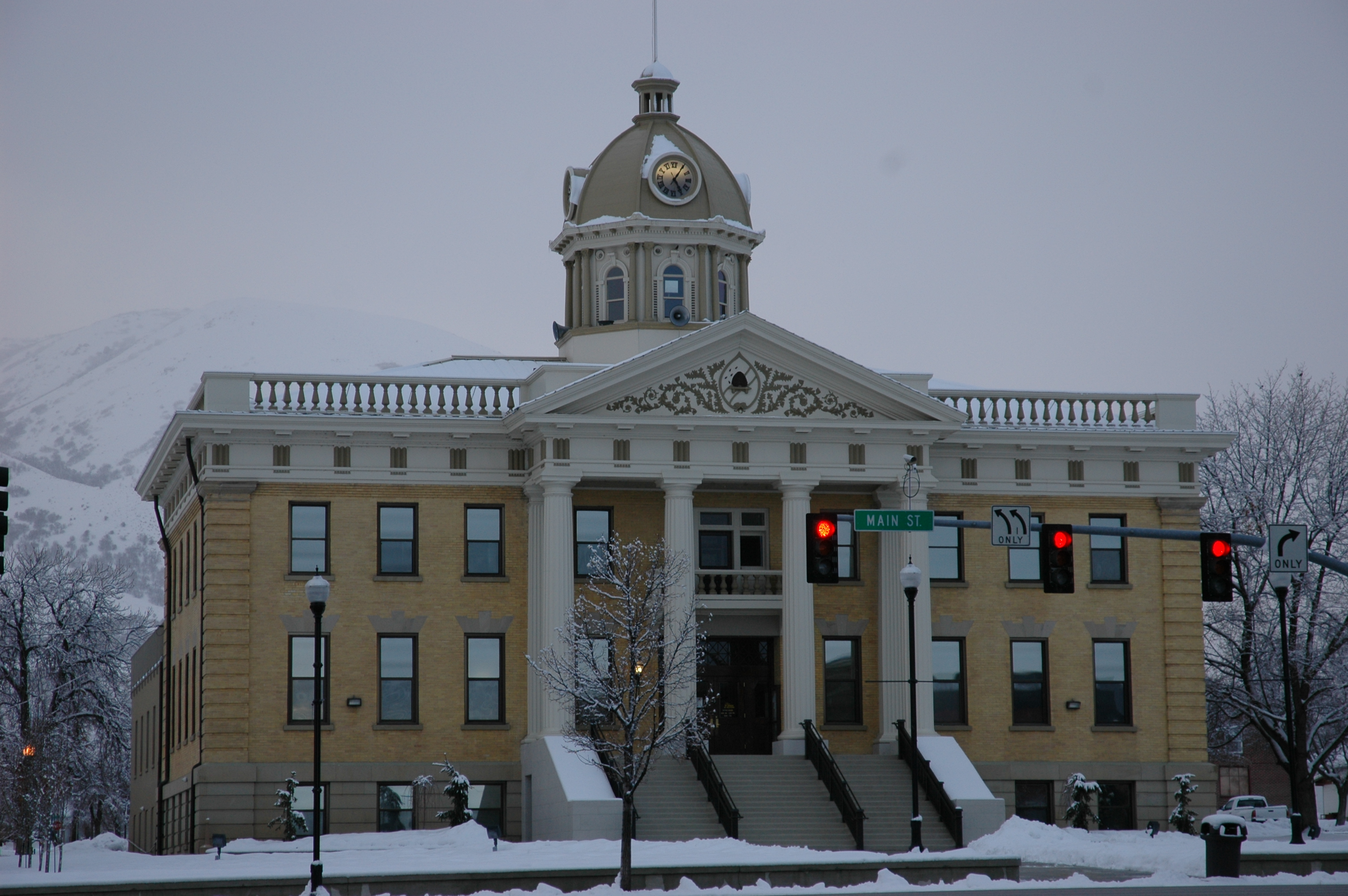
- Photo in 2010

- Location within Utah Location within the United States
- Location: 1 N. Main St., Brigham City, Utah
- Coordinates: 41°30′38″N 112°0′51″W
- Area: 1.2 acres (0.49 ha)
- Built: 1857, 1910
- Architect: Funk, Andrew and Wells, Carson
- Architectural style: Classical Revival
- NRHP reference No.: 88000399
- Added to NRHP: April 7, 1988

The Box Elder County Courthouse is a courthouse at 1 N. Main St. in Brigham City, Utah. It was built in 1857 and expanded greatly in 1910. The 1910 addition includes Classical Revival architecture designed by local architects Andrew Funk and Carson Wells and provides the architecturally significant portion of the building. The building is significant as the only courthouse in the county and for having held all departments of the county government over the years. It is asserted to be the best example of Neo-Classical Revival architecture in the city and in Box Elder County.

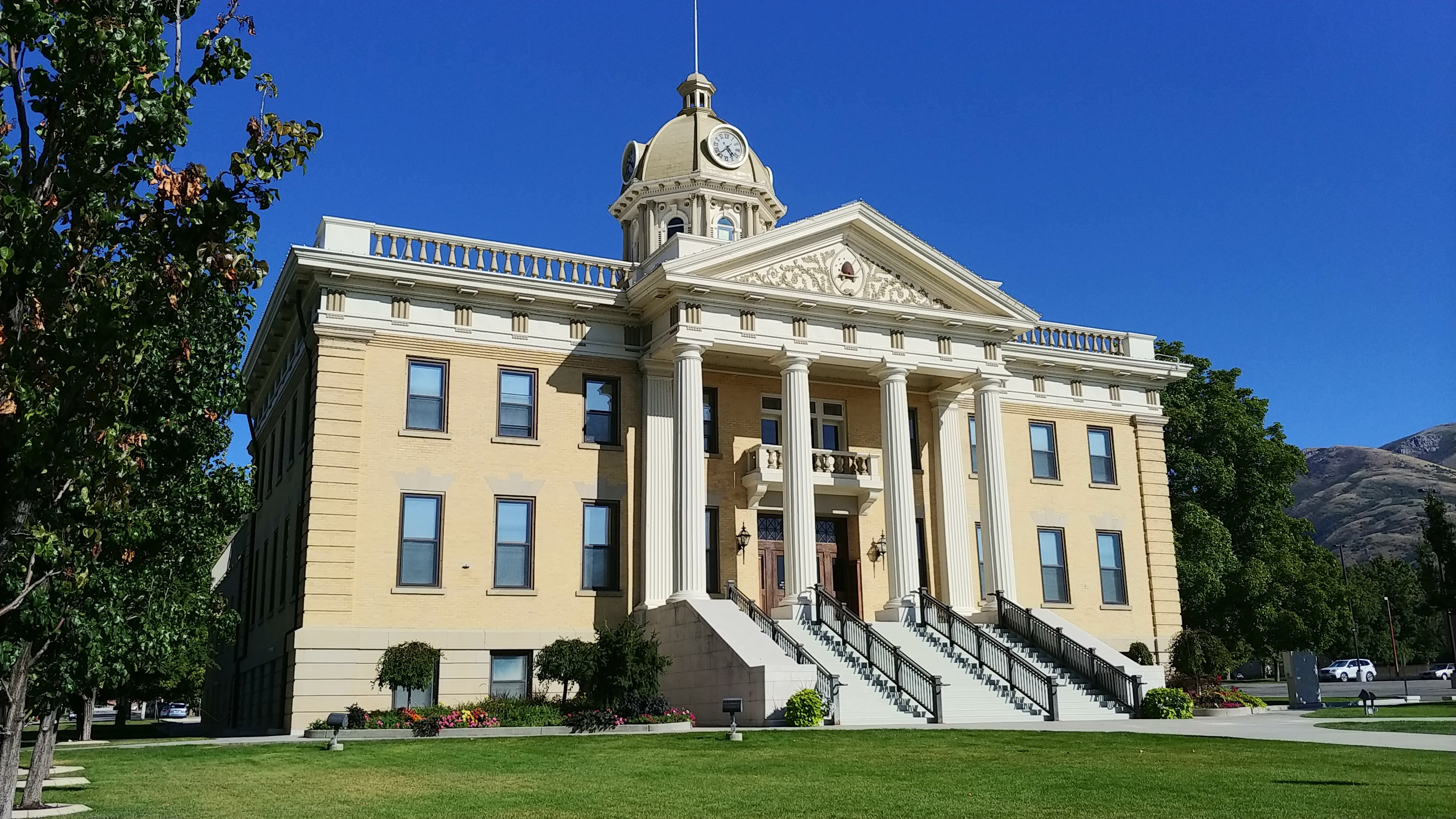
Box Elder County Courthouse in Brigham City

It was listed on the National Register of Historic Places in 1988.
