= Carson Elementary School =

Carson Elementary School may refer to:

- Carson Elementary School (Quesnel)
- Carson Elementary School (Carson, Washington)
- Carson Elementary School (Texas)
