= Walter Carsen Centre =

Coordinates: 43.637787°N 79.393537°W

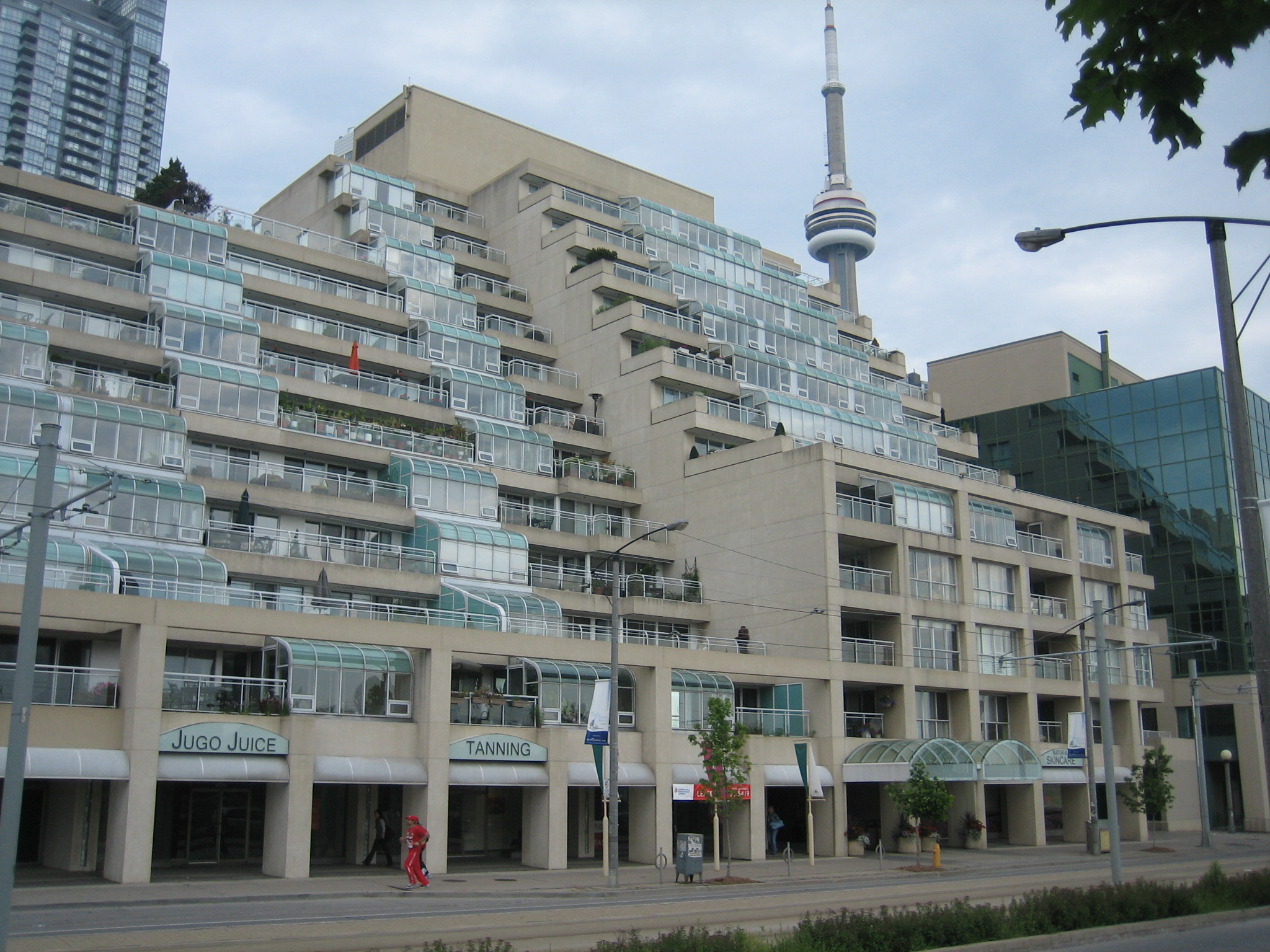
The King's Landing building, which houses the Walter Carsen Centre.

The Walter Carsen Centre for The National Ballet of Canada is a building at 470 Queens Quay West on the waterfront in Toronto, Ontario, Canada. The lower levels house the headquarters of the National Ballet of Canada and the ballet's rehearsal space. The facility has 8,825 square metres of space, more than the Four Seasons Centre where the ballet performs. Previously the ballet had been based at St. Lawrence Hall and scattered other buildings through the downtown core. Built in 1995, it was named to honour patron of the arts Walter Carsen who donated CA$1.5 million towards its construction.

The centre is inside the King's Landing luxury condominium building. This structure was completed in 1984, and designed by Arthur Erickson. The 320 unit building was one of the first condominiums to be built in the former industrial region along the lake shore. The lower levels were always intended to be arts space, linked to the Harbourfront facility. Various proposals, including locating the Bata Shoe Museum in the space fell through, and the vast space remained empty and unfinished until the ballet moved there.
